= Charles Lynch (judge) =

American planter, politician, military officer and judge (1736–1796)

Personal details
- Born: Circa. 1736 Albemarle County, Virginia
- Died: October 29, 1796 (aged 59–60) Altavista, Virginia
- Resting place: Avoca Plantation
- Relatives: John Lynch (brother); Sarah Lynch Terrell (sister)

Charles Lynch (1736 – 1796) was an American planter, politician, military officer and judge from Central Virginia. The terms "lynching" and "lynch law" are likely derived from Colonel Lynch's efforts to suppress various Loyalist conspiracies on the Virginia frontier during the Revolution, although as practiced by Lynch, the practice referred to a whipping, and not an execution. Lynch himself would help to free five enslaved individuals through deeds of manumission in 1792 and 1793.

== Early life ==
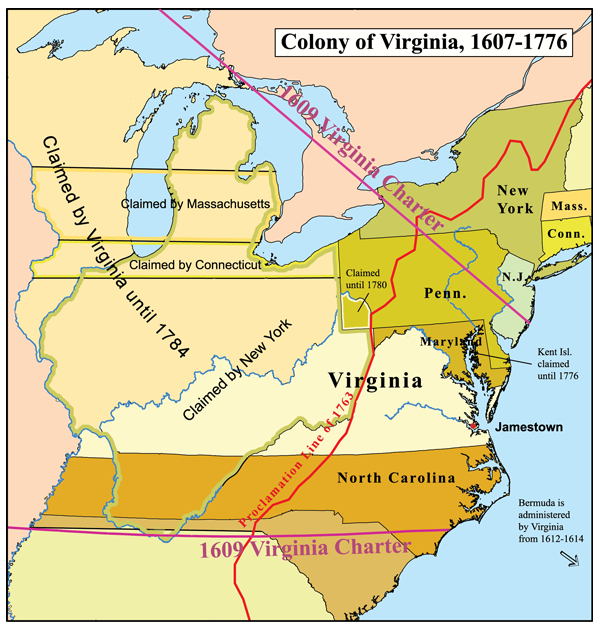
Map of the Colony of Virginia during the pre-revolutionary era.

Lynch was born in 1736 at his father's estate near today's Pen Park in Charlottesville. He was the second child and eldest son of Charles Lynch, Sr. and Sarah Clark Lynch. An Irish immigrant of unknown origins, Lynch's father had come to Virginia around 1720 as an indentured servant to the prominent Louisa County planter Christopher Clark. Lynch remained with the planter for his fixed term of servitude, winning in the process not only his freedom but also the hand of the planter's daughter, Sarah Clark, in marriage.

With the financial assistance of the elder Clark, the Lynches moved further west in 1734, following the Rivanna River towards what would become the city of Charlottesville. Within a decade, Lynch Sr. had become a notable planter, ferry operator, and surveyor who counted both Joshua Fry and Peter Jefferson among his neighbors and associates. Following the creation of Albemarle County in 1745, Lynch, Sr. would be appointed to serve as a magistrate, sheriff, and captain in the militia of the new county, and was elected alongside Fry to represent Albemarle County in Virginia's House of Burgesses in 1748.

In 1750, the family moved from their home along the Rivanna to a spot further west on the James River. Originally called Chestnut Hill by the Lynch family, it occupies the current area of the modern city of Lynchburg. When Lynch Sr. passed away in 1753, Lynch inherited a substantial plot of land between the Otter and Staunton Rivers in today's Campbell County and five enslaved individuals. Named Green Level, that plot of land would become the seat of Lynch's estate and his permanent place of residence.

Lynch's mother Sarah was a devout Quaker and raised her six children in the faith. Following the family's move to Chestnut Hill, Sarah began inviting her neighbors for worship at the Lynch home. In 1754, the growing Quaker community petitioned the Cedar Creek Meeting for a public meeting of their own, which was granted. They continued to meet in private homes until 1798, when the South River Meetinghouse was completed. It had been built on land Sarah had donated for the construction. Charles married a fellow Quaker named Anne Terrell on January 12, 1755, and was an active member of the meeting.

Between 1758 and 1763, Charles was a "veritable pillar of the church community in which he lived." He served on numerous committees that oversaw internal church affairs, traveled as a representative of the meeting to the Quarterly Meeting, and kept the meeting's records as the clerk. Lynch had a falling out with the meeting starting in 1764 over the disownment of Charles' younger brother Christopher, eventually culminating in Lynch being disowned for "taking oaths" in 1767. While neither he nor Christopher would ever rejoin the Quaker meeting, their siblings John and Sarah remained devout members of the faith. Charles' wife Anne would also remain in the meeting for the rest of her life, and their two eldest sons, Charles Jr. and Anselm, would not be disowned until 1782.

== Political Career ==
While his membership in the Quaker meeting had prevented Charles from pursuing political office, his disownment and high social status made him an ideal candidate and he soon received appointment as a justice of the peace of Bedford County, Virginia. In 1769, Lynch was elected to the House of Burgesses from Bedford County alongside John Talbot. For the next nine years, Lynch served as one of Bedford County's representatives in the House of Burgesses, a tumultuous period that saw Virginia transition from a loyal British colony into an independent state.

During that time, Lynch participated in a number of important moments in Virginia's road towards rebellion. In his first session as a burgess, Lynch was appointed to the Committee of Trade, which was at the time a central point of tension between the colonies and Parliament; in May of that same year, Lynch and the majority of the other burgesses, including George Washington, Thomas Jefferson, and Patrick Henry, signed the 1769 Non-Importation Resolutions in protest against the British Townshend Acts after the House had been dissolved by Lord Botetourt, the royal governor of Virginia. Though largely absent between 1770 and 1773, Lynch returned in 1774 in the wake of the Boston Tea Party and the passage of the Intolerable Acts designed to punish the city of Boston and reassert royal authority in the colonies. When the House of Burgesses was again dissolved by Lord Dunmore, the new royal governor, for protesting the punitive legislation, Lynch and eighty-eight other burgesses, including Washington, Jefferson, and Henry, signed another resolution, this time boycotting the importation of both British-made goods and enslaved individuals into the colony.

As colonial frustrations deepened into outright hostility, Lynch again represented Bedford County in a series of conventions in 1775 that oversaw Virginia's preparation for war and the revolutionary restructuring of its government. Perhaps most notably, Lynch was present for Patrick Henry's immortal "Give Me Liberty or Give Me Death" speech in March of 1775 and voted in favor of Henry's resolves to raise and arm the county militias in anticipation of the coming conflict. Following the Battles of Lexington and Concord, Lynch attended yet another convention that elected representatives for the colony to the Continental Congress, established an eleven-man Committee of Safety with executive powers, and created two infantry regiments under the command of Patrick Henry. After these conventions, however, Lynch pivoted away from politics. While he maintained his seat in the House of Delegates, he would rarely be in attendance for its sessions after 1775. Instead, Lynch's attention became ever more fixated on Virginia's attempts to domestically produce necessary war materials. He would, however, attend the last the Virginia's Revolutionary Conventions in May 1776, and vote in favor of both the passage of Virginia's Declaration of Rights and a resolution directing Virginia's delegates in the Continental Congress to move for independence.

== Gunpowder and Lead Manufacturing ==
The Gunpowder Incident, which had taken place in April 1775 in Williamsburg when Lord Dunmore had ordered British marines to secretly remove the gunpowder stored in the public Powder Magazine, had exposed the colony's desperate need for powder. Thanks to the mercantilist economic policies of the imperial powers of the time, all of the gunpowder shipped into the colonies had been exclusively British exports. Now that the colonies had rebelled against Great Britain, finding alternative sources of gunpowder was of utmost importance to the patriot cause.

By at least June of 1775, Charles Lynch had erected a gunpowder mill on the property of his neighbor Benjamin Clement and begun to produce powder for the war effort. Throughout the summer of 1775, numerous advertisements in the Virginia Gazette updated readers on the progress of the Lynch's operation, prompting correspondence between Lynch, Jefferson, and the Virginia Delegates to the Continental Congress on the progress of Lynch's efforts to find suitable deposits of saltpeter. Otherwise known as potassium nitrate, saltpeter was a vital component of gunpowder manufacture, making up 75% of military grade powder's composition in 1775, and was by August in short supply. Such was its importance that Lynch would write to the Virginia Gazette that "without [saltpeter], we can have no powder, and subsequently no means of defense; but with it we shall soon have both." Suitable deposits were discovered by Lynch in the early autumn months, and production increased to such an extent that by February 1776 Lynch was receiving substantial warrants from the Virginia Committee of Safety to fund improvements to his mill. In May of 1776, Lynch formally petitioned the Committee of Safety for more manpower to help operate his mill. The Committee resolved to hire out nine enslaved individuals then currently being held in the Williamsburg jail who had either been apprehended fleeing to the British or had been captured after the Battle of Great Bridge in December of 1775. At the same time, the Committee formalized their arrangement with Lynch, allowing Lynch to pay off his debt to the state by supplying gunpowder and setting the price for his gunpowder at six shillings per pound. His would be the only state-funded gunpowder mill in Virginia between 1776 and 1778, and he would report a total of 1,400 pounds of gunpowder produced for the state in a 1779 audit.

Lynch's effective management of his powder mill soon saw him elevated in December 1777 to the superintendency of the Chiswell Lead Mines near modern Austinville, Virginia. He was at the same time elevated to the rank of Colonel in the Bedford County militia. Jefferson had referred to the mines as being "an object of vast importance" to the patriot cause in a 1776 letter to Patrick Henry, and much of the lead used by the Continental Army during the war was produced there. In 1779 alone, nearly 65,000 pounds of lead were produced at Chiswell under Lynch's direction. Much of that backbreaking labor, however, was carried out by dozens of enslaved individuals who had been captured either trying to escape to the British or at Great Bridge. Lynch would maintain the superintendency until 1789, and keep the mines both productive and secure from numerous Loyalist conspiracies in 1779 and 1780.

== "Lynch's Law" ==
Owing to the importance of the Chiswell Lead Mines to the patriot cause and their location on the Loyalist-leaning Virginia frontier, it is not surprising that the mines became the target of several Loyalist plots in 1779 and 1780. The largest of these plots was uncovered by a patriot spy named John Wyatt in the summer of 1780. Wyatt discovered that the Loyalists intended to seize the Chiswell Lead Mines and march east, capturing the Continental arsenal at New London and then freeing the 4,000 or so British prisoners-of-war being held in Charlottesville and arming them with the newly acquired guns, powder, and lead. Likely at home in Bedford County when he got the news, Lynch quickly rounded up the local Loyalists with remarkable speed thanks to the discovery of a list of conspirators during an arrest of several known Loyalists.

Lynch subsequently reported his counterinsurgency operations to Governor Thomas Jefferson, who responded on August 1st and complimented Lynch on his "method of seizing them at once" and stated that "[Lynch's] activity on this occasion, deserves great commendation, and meets it from the Executive." Jefferson also wrote that "the most vigorous, decisive measures shou'd be continued for seizing every one on whom probable proof of guilt shall appear. Those who have been leaders of the combination, who have enlisted others into it, or who have accepted commissions from the enemy shou'd be tried before an examining court for high treason, and if found guilty sent here for further trial." The reality on the ground, however, prevented Lynch from following Jefferson's orders exactly as they were given. With threats against both his family and home county and the lead mines some 130 miles distant, Lynch simply did not have the time to wait for the next session of the Bedford County Court to try the accused. Instead, Lynch elected to try them immediately in order to quell the Loyalist threat in Bedford County and free up Lynch and his militiamen to deal with the threat against the lead mines.

The trials that followed have largely been shrouded in myth and misunderstanding because of the dearth of primary source material, but both biographer W. M. Golden and local historian Alfred Percy argue that the trials conducted at Lynch's Green Level were courts martial and were done with utmost attention to legality, as per Jefferson's orders that Lynch "take care that they be regularly tried afterwards." Oral traditions uniformly agree that those convicted of treason were tied by their thumbs to a black walnut tree in front of Lynch's home and sentenced to 39 lashes with a cat-o-nine-tails. This sentence could, however, be commuted by the accused saying "Liberty Forever" and signing their name to an enlistment in the Continental Army. As the colonel of the county militia, Lynch naturally presided over these proceedings and his surname became attached to this method of justice, and it became known as "Lynch's Law." Numerous pension applications and primary sources confirm that this term originally referred only to a whipping, not extrajudicial executions by hanging. The association of the term "lynching" with racially motivated vigilante executions would not come until the mid-19th century.

Following a precedent set in 1779, Lynch and "all other persons whatsoever" involved in putting down the 1780 Loyalist conspiracy were indemnified against any legal action by an act of the Virginia General Assembly in 1782 which declared that their actions were "justifiable from the imminence of danger."

== Military Service ==
In January 1781, Colonel Charles Lynch and the Bedford County militia were ordered south by Governor Jefferson to join with the army of General Nathanael Greene, who had recently outraced Lord Charles Cornwallis' British Army to the crossings of the Dan River in northern North Carolina. Lynch and his 300 or so militiamen arrived at Greene's camp at High Rock Ford on March 10th or 11th, and were deployed in the dense woods on Greene's right flank as part of Lieutenant Colonel William Washington's Corps of Observation on March 15th for the Battle of Guilford Courthouse. Paired with the elite Continental regulars of Captain Robert Kirkwood's Delaware Regiment, Lynch's riflemen engaged in a vicious running fight with Cornwallis's elite 33rd Regiment of Foot and Hessian jaegers that left nearly all of Lynch's officers killed or wounded. Cornwallis' troops were unable to turn Greene's right flank or block his retreat thanks to the efforts of Kirkwood and Lynch, and Lynch's riflemen were praised by Greene after the battle for their "gallant behavior." Family lore states that Charles' second son Anselm snuck away from home and joined his father's militia on the eve of battle despite his father's objection; he would in 1782 be elevated to the rank of lieutenant in the Bedford County militia.

Though Cornwallis' army would hold the field at the end of the battle, it would prove to be a Pyrrhic victory for the British, who lost nearly a quarter of their army and many of their best battlefield commanders. Forced to retreat back to the safety of the British naval guns at Wilmington, Cornwallis and his army were pursued across North Carolina by the advance elements of Greene's army, including Lynch and his riflemen, who only turned back from the pursuit after Cornwallis successfully got his army across Cross Creek near modern day Fayetteville, North Carolina. Though he would march with his men to Williamsburg in anticipation of the siege at Yorktown in the fall of 1781, Lynch returned to Bedford County in the wake of Banastre Tarleton's raid on Charlottesville in June 1781 which breathed new life into what remained of the Loyalist underground on the Virginia frontier. Lynch would spend the rest of 1781 putting down the last traces of the Loyalist network along the frontier.

== Later life and death ==
As the Revolution wound down after Cornwallis' defeat at Yorktown, Lynch took on roles as both a justice of the peace and colonel of the militia in the newly created Campbell County, which had been formed in 1782 and named in honor of Lynch's fellow frontier patriot William Campbell. From 1785 - 1789, Lynch also served in the Virginia State Senate, where he helped to pass the Virginia Statute for Establishing Religious Freedom and the bill that formalized the creation of the town of Lynchburg at the site of his father's old estate at Chestnut Hill, where his younger brother John had established a thriving ferry business.

Following the passage of Virginia's Manumission Act in 1782, which allowed slaveowners to free their enslaved individuals by deed or by will through the county courts, Charles' brother John and many other local Quakers within the South River Meeting had freed their slaves. In 1792 and 1793, Charles Lynch helped to free five enslaved individuals named Nan, Robert, Harry, James, and Feander through two deeds of manumission signed with his brother John and nephew-in-law Samuel Mitchell, who had all jointly inherited those five enslaved individuals after the death of Christopher Lynch in 1782. They cited their reasons for doing so in the preamble to the second deed of manumission that reflected the influence of both the ideals of the Revolution and egalitarian tenets of the Quaker faith:

"We Charles Lynch John Lynch & Sam Mitchell from a Conviction that all men are by nature free & agreeable to the Command of our Savior Christ believe it our duty to do unto all men as we would they should do unto us...liberate the following [enslaved individuals]..."

Charles had also previously voted in favor of pro-manumission legislation while in the Senate. Unfortunately, the question of whether or not Charles intended to free the 34 or more enslaved individuals on his plantation remains unanswered to this day because of an incredible stroke of misfortune that bankrupted Charles in the final years of his life.

Dubbed the Great Tax Debacle by later family members, Charles had in 1788 taken out a bond of 20,000 pounds as security on the debts his nephews James and Robert Adams had accrued while serving as Campbell County sheriffs in the 1780s. When his nephews proved unable to pay off their debts, Charles was forced to mortgage nearly everything he owned in 1794. Desperate attempts to make back some money off his stakes in the Chiswell lead mines failed, along with overtures to his son Charles in Kentucky, who had wracked up significant debts of his own through land speculation. The last straw was a hailstorm in 1795 that ruined Colonel Lynch's tobacco crop. He died completely insolvent in 1796 without even leaving a will, and was buried in front of his estate without a headstone in keeping with the Quaker tenets of his early years. His brother John would testify that Charles died "much embarrassed in his circumstances," a sad ending for a man who had once gone toe-to-toe with some of the best soldiers in the British Army and counted himself among the elites of Virginia. Later his descendants would mark the graves of Charles and his wife Anne in the family cemetery and inscribe the epitaph "A Zealous and Active Patriot of the Revolution" into his headstone.

== See also ==
- Lynching in the United States
