= John Lynch (1740–1820) =

American founder of Lynchburg (1740–1820)

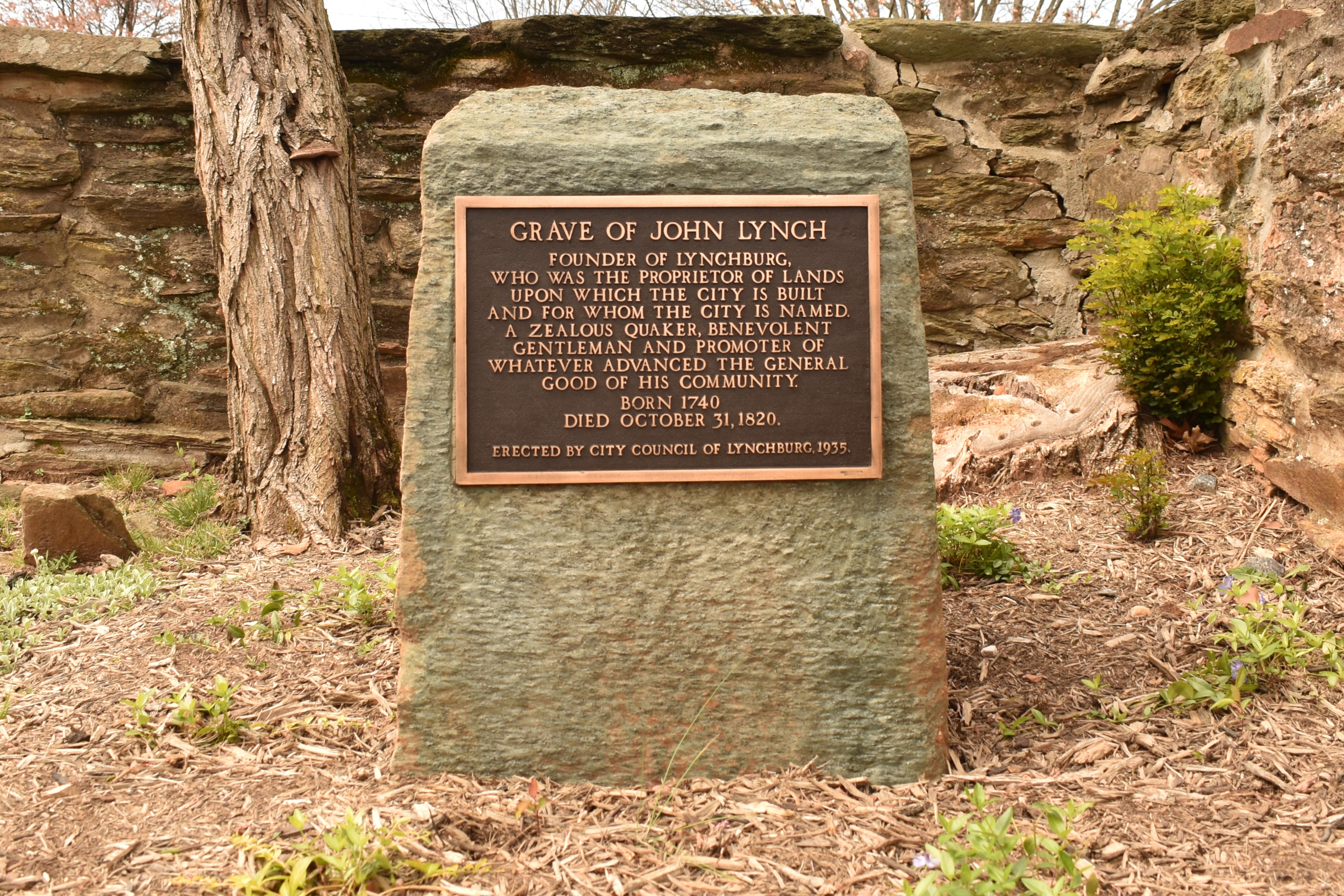
- John Lynch's grave, at the South River Friends Meetinghouse

Personal details
- Born: August 28, 1740 Albemarle County, Virginia
- Died: October 31, 1820 (aged 80) Lynchburg, Virginia
- Resting place: South River Friends Meetinghouse
- Relatives: Charles Lynch (brother); Sarah Lynch Terrell (sister)

John Lynch (August 28, 1740 – October 31, 1820) was an American merchant and abolitionist who founded the city of Lynchburg, Virginia.

== Early life ==
Lynch was born on August 28, 1740, in Albemarle County, Virginia. Lynch's father was Charles Lynch Sr., who was born in Galway, Ireland, but immigrated to Virginia in 1720, marrying John's mother, Sarah. John was the youngest of six siblings, another of whom was Charles Jr., a judge believed to be the namesake of lynching. Charles Sr. died in 1752, when Lynch was 13. Lynch's mother, Sarah, was an active member in the local Quaker meeting, and she donated land that would become the South River Friends Meetinghouse. Lynch would later donate additional land and help build a new meetinghouse on the same property. He married a woman named Mary Bowles while still young.

== Founding of Lynchburg ==
Lynch's father had patented 410 acres of land in the Piedmont region of Virginia, and bought another 550 acres from John Bolling, the latter of which held the present day site of Lynchburg. The Lynch Ferry across the James River was established by the family in about 1745. In 1757, seventeen-year-old John Lynch took over control of the ferry business. Years later, first in 1784 and again in 1786, Lynch petitioned the General Assembly of Virginia for a charter to establish a town on the bluffs above the ferry upon land Lynch had inherited from an older brother. The 1786 petition was granted, and the town of Lynchburg was founded.

== Personal life ==
Lynch was a devout Quaker throughout his life. In 1787, he was briefly disowned by the local meeting, but later reconciled with them, writing that he had "given way to the spirit of resentment," and asked for the meeting's forgiveness.

=== Abolition ===
Lynch freed all of his slaves by the mid-1780s, including the slave who allegedly killed Lynch's son. He consistently supported the antislavery movement.

Lynch's sister, Sarah Lynch Terrell, was an elder in the local Quaker meeting. She was a well-known anti-slavery advocate in her own right, with one account saying she "so strongly [impressed] her neighbors that many leading men acted on her suggestion and freed their bondsman”. Her will, known as "The Last Sayings of Sarah Lynch Terrell", became a slavery abolitionist tract to other Quakers in Colonial Virginia. Quakers, despite only accounting for a small minority of Virginia's population, were estimated to be responsible for over 25% of manumissions between 1782 and 1806.

== Death ==
Lynch died on October 31, 1820, and is buried at the South River Friends Meetinghouse. A Lynchburg local wrote the following obituary of Lynch:

He was a zealous and pious member of the Society of Friends, and although laboring for the last fifty years of his life under a pulmonary complaint, which rendered him extremely weak and feeble in body, he was nevertheless active and prompt in the discharge of the various duties of husband, father, and friend. He possessed a mind of the first order — a mind unimpaired by disease or old age, until a very short time before his death, and a fortitude and firmness of character seldom equaled... Few measures of a general nature were set on foot without consulting him, and he was always found a zealous promoter of whatever tended to advance the general good. Amongst other traits of character in this excellent man, those of charity and benevolence were very conspicuous. To the poor his doors were ever opened.

== Sources ==
- Elson, James M. (2004). Lynchburg, Virginia: The First Two Hundred Years 1786 – 1986. Lynchburg, VA: Warwick House Publishing. ISBN 978-1-890306-72-4. LCCN 2004111050.
- Loyd, Richard B.; Mundy, Bernard K. (1975). Lynchburg: A Pictorial History. Virginia Beach, VA: Donning Company. ISBN 0-915442-06-X. LCCN 75020230.
- Chambers, S. Allen Jr. (1981). Lynchburg: An Architectural History. University Press of Virginia. ISBN 978-0-8139-0882-3. LCCN 81003000.
- Scruggs, Philip Lightfoot (1978). The History of Lynchburg, Virginia 1786–1946. J. P. Bell. LCCN 78184897.
