= James River Day School =

Coordinates: 37°26′41.6″N 79°13′36.8″W

- JRDS

Location
- 5039 Boonsboro Road; Lynchburg, Virginia; United States

Information
- Type: Independent, Private
- Head of school: Jenn Lindsay
- Faculty: 14:1
- Teaching staff: 40
- Grades: K to 8
- Gender: Co-Educational
- Enrollment: 244
- Campus type: Suburban
- Colors: Red and White
- Athletics: Fall Season: 5th & 6th Grade Soccer (coed), 7th & 8th Grade Soccer (coed), Cross Country (coed for grades 5-8), Girls' 5th & 6th Grade Volleyball, and Girls' 7th & 8th Grade Volleyball; Winter Season: Boys' 5th & 6th Grade Basketball, Boys' 7th & 8th Grade Basketball, Girls' 5th & 6th Grade Basketball, and Girls' 7th & 8th Grade Basketball, Spring Season: Boys' and Girls' Lacrosse
- Mascot: Cardinal (bird)
- Nickname: JRDS
- Affiliations: NAIS, VAIS
- Website: www.jamesriverdayschool.org

James River Day School, or JRDS, is an independent, co-educational, non-sectarian K-8 day school in Lynchburg, Virginia. JRDS serves academically qualified students in Kindergarten through 8th Grade, regardless of race, color, national origin, ethnic, social, or economic background.

== Faculty ==
Total Faculty 41

Faculty holding advanced degrees = more than 50%

== Curriculum ==
James River Day School offers instruction in reading and language arts, mathematics, science, history and social studies, visual arts, music, physical education, technology, and world languages for Grades K-8.

Students in Grades 5-8 compete in a variety of sports throughout the year, including soccer, volleyball, cross country, basketball, and lacrosse.

== Accreditation ==
The Virginia Association of Independent Schools has accredited JRDS since 1979.
