= Lynchburg, Virginia =

Independent city in Virginia, United States

- Independent city
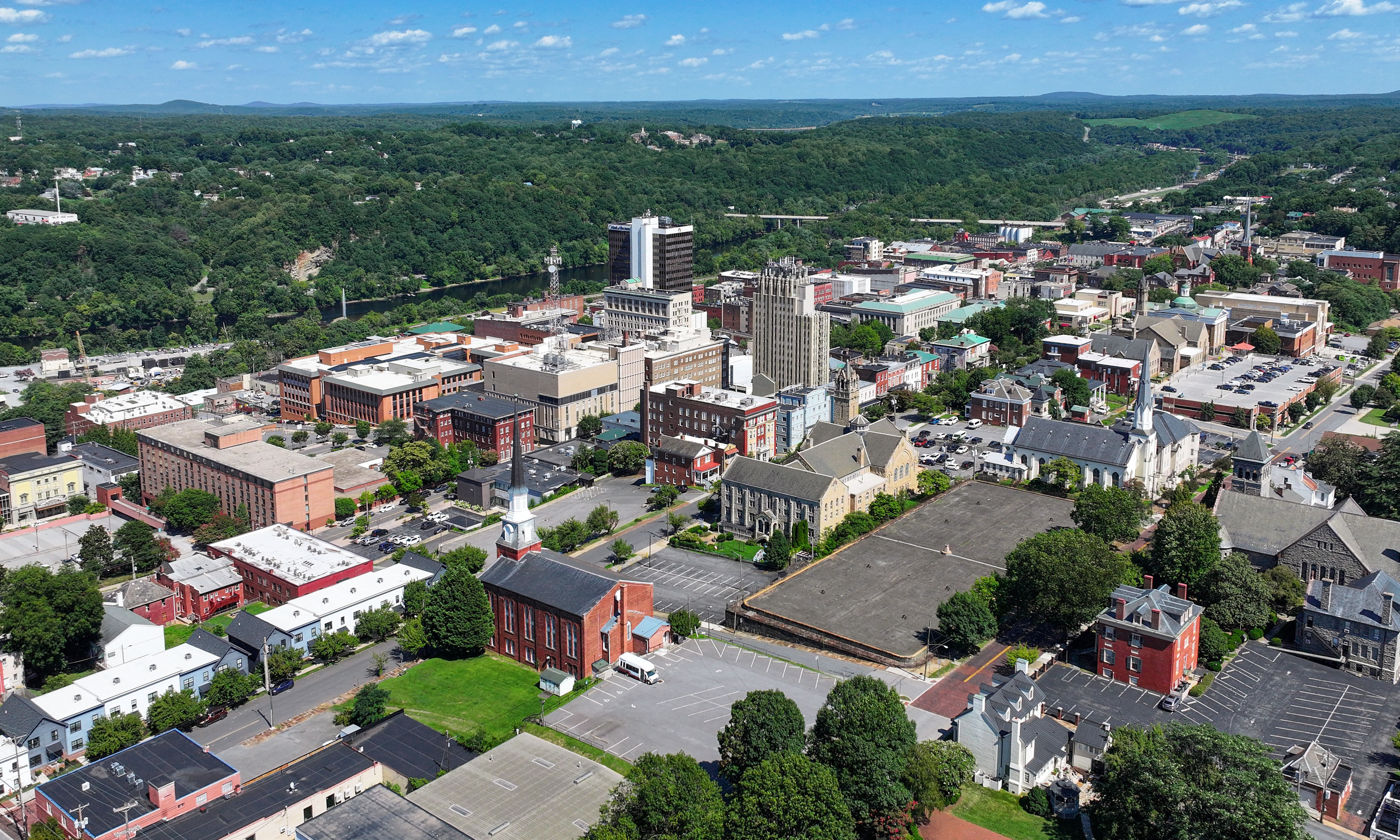
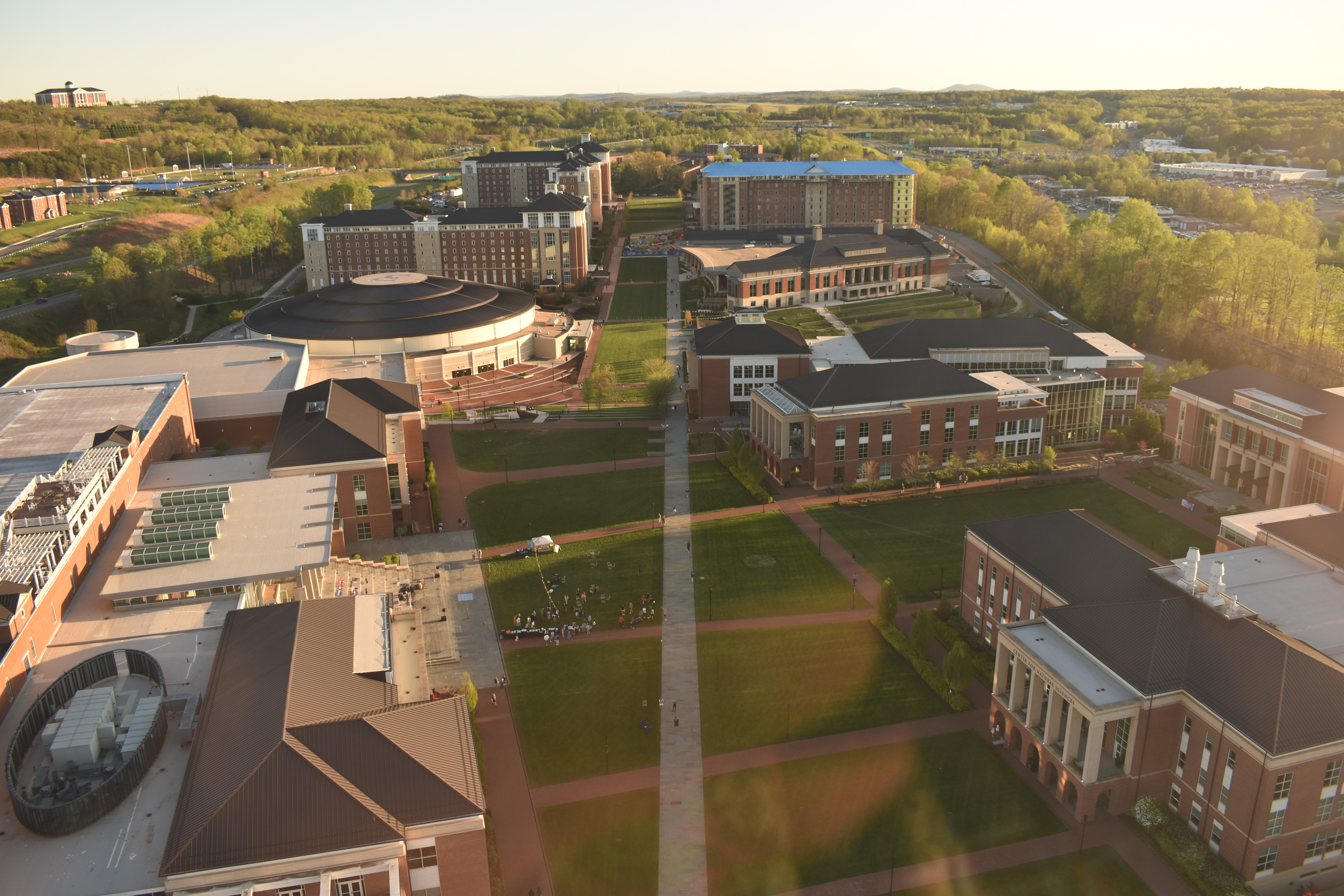
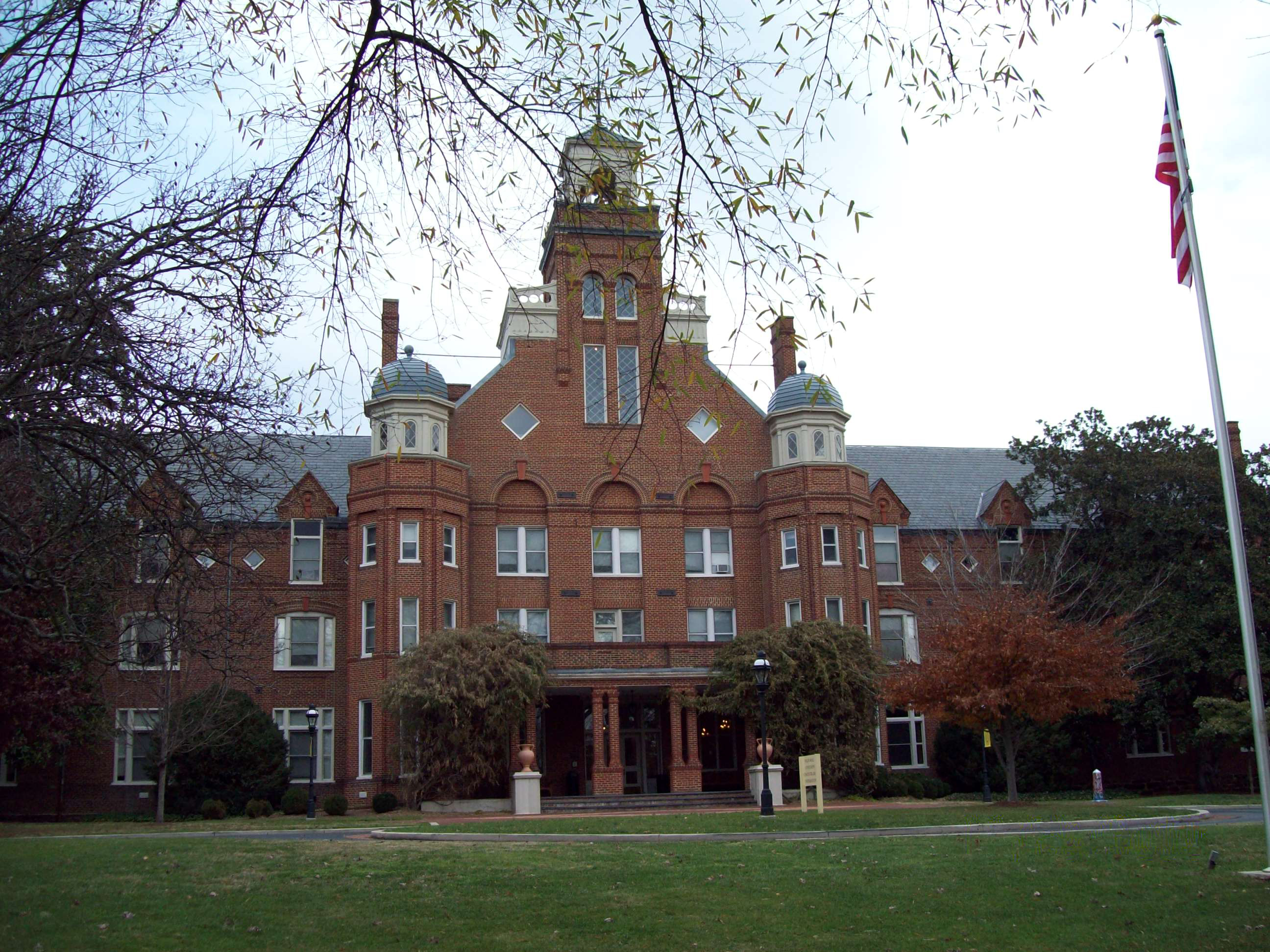
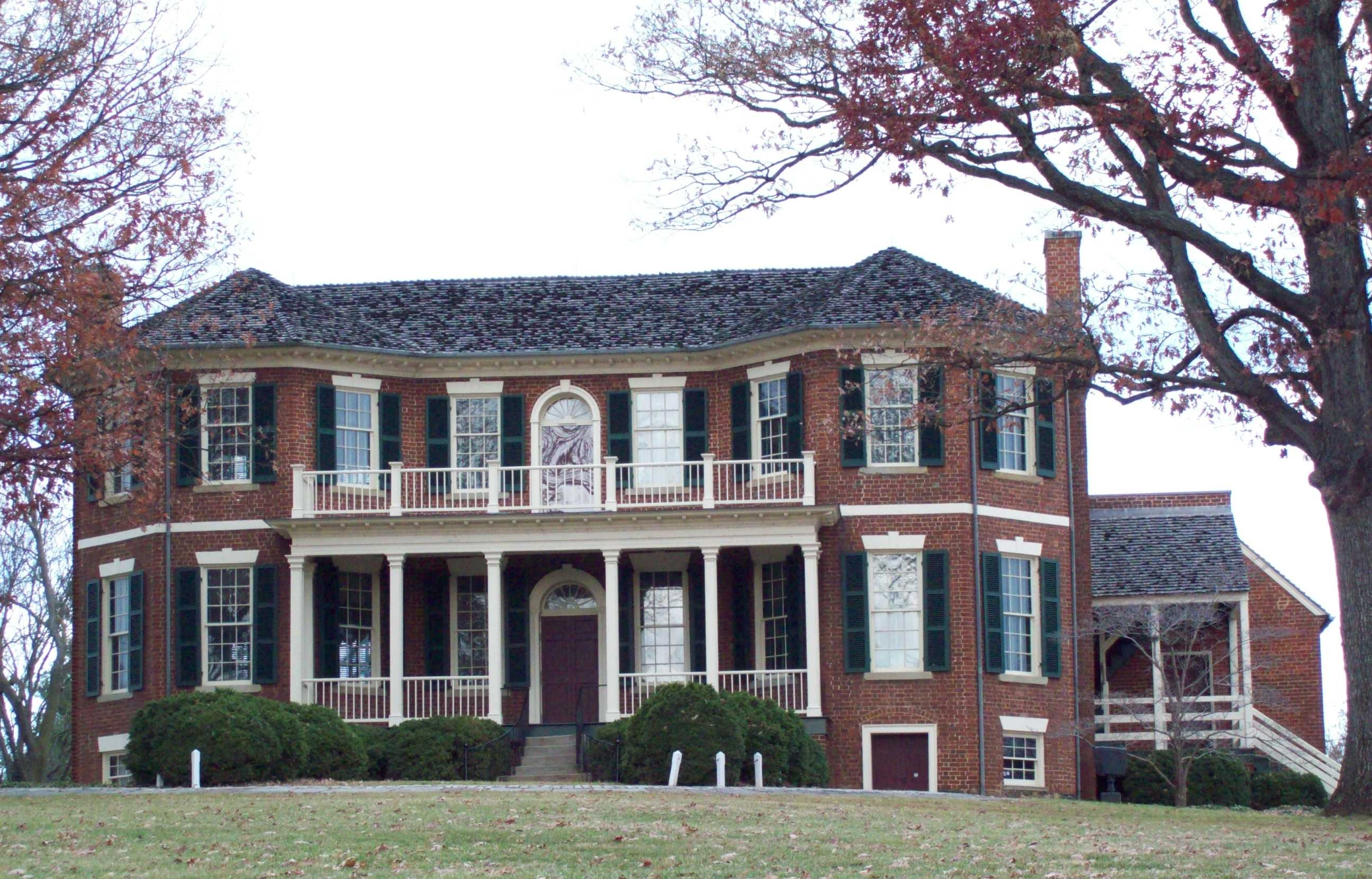
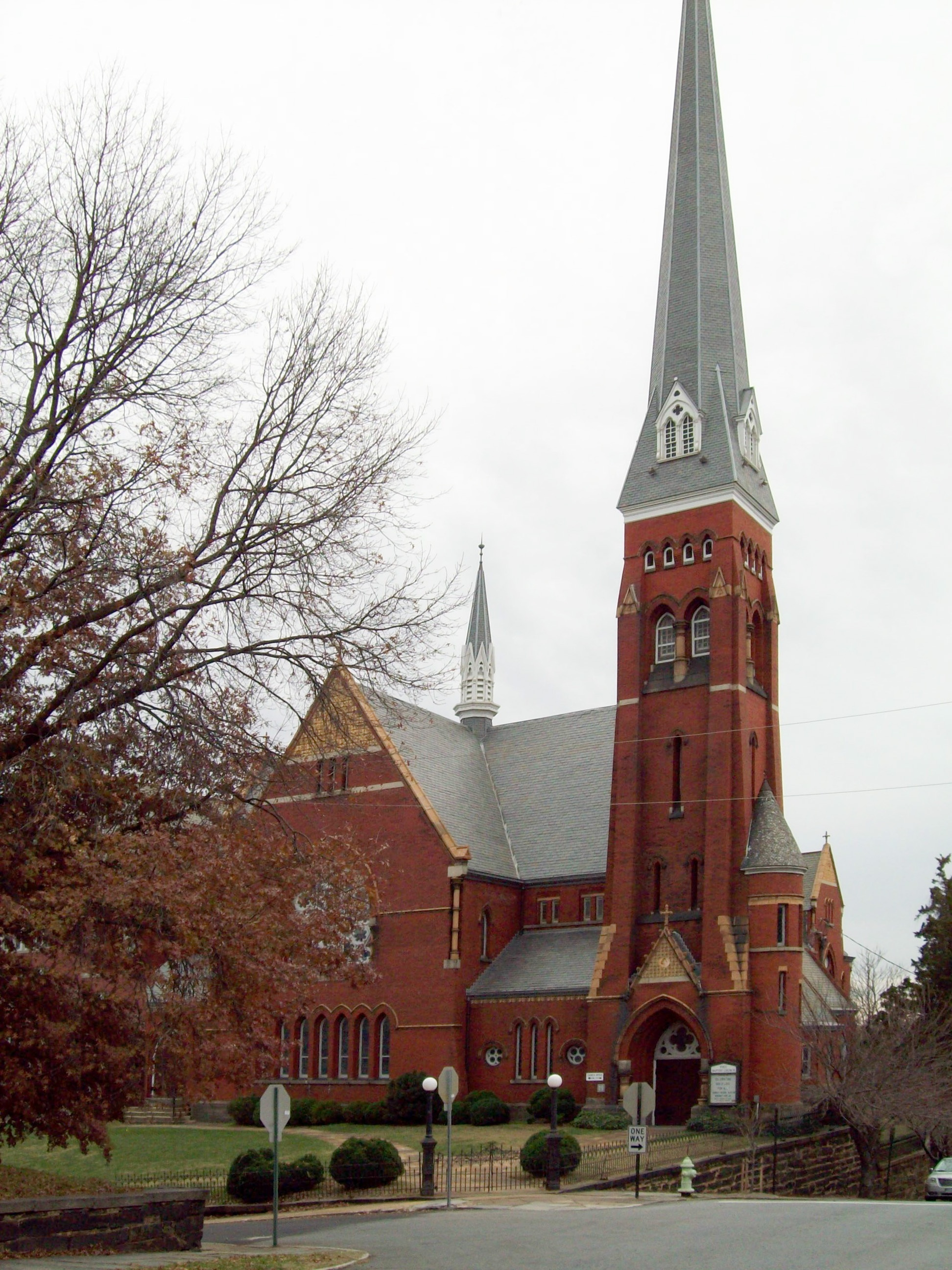
- Skyline of Lynchburg Liberty University Randolph College Point of Honor First Baptist Church

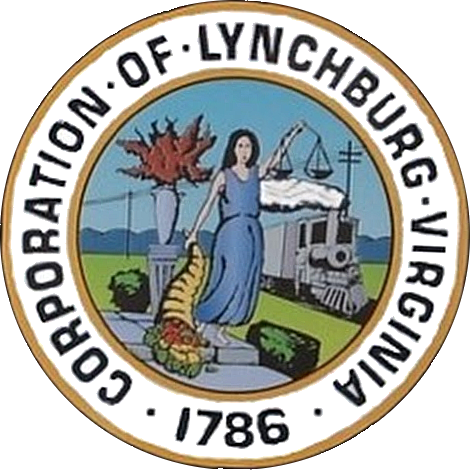
- Seal Logo
- Nicknames: City of Seven Hills, The Hill City
- Interactive map of Lynchburg, Virginia
- Location within Virginia Location within the United States
- Coordinates: 37°24′13″N 79°10′12″W
- Country: United States
- State: Virginia
- Founded: 1786
- Incorporated (town): January 10, 1805
- Incorporated (city): 1852
- Named for: John Lynch

Government
  - Type: Council–Manager
  - Mayor: Larry Taylor (R)
  - Vice Mayor: Curt Diemer (R)
  - Council: Lynchburg City Council

Area
  - Independent city: 49.53 sq mi (128.27 km^{2})
  - Land: 48.97 sq mi (126.84 km^{2})
  - Water: 0.55 sq mi (1.43 km^{2})
- Elevation: 630 ft (192 m)

Population (2020)
  - Independent city: 79,009
  - Estimate (2025): 81,347 ▲
  - Rank: 11th in Virginia
  - Density: 1,613.3/sq mi (622.90/km^{2})
  - Urban: 125,596 (US: 268th)
  - Metro: 261,593 (US: 190th)
  - Demonym: Lynchburger
- Time zone: UTC−5 (EST)
  - Summer (DST): UTC−4 (EDT)
- ZIP code(s): 24501, 24502, 24503, 24504, 24505, 24551
- Area code(s): 434
- FIPS code: 51-680
- GNIS feature ID: 1479007
- Website: lynchburgva.gov

Lynchburg is an independent city in Virginia, United States. Located in the foothills of the Blue Ridge Mountains along the James River, it had a population of 79,009 at the 2020 census, making it the 11th-most populous city in Virginia. It is nicknamed the "City of Seven Hills" or the "Hill City." Lynchburg was founded in 1757 by John Lynch, a Quaker ferry operator and abolitionist. During the American Civil War, Lynchburg's strategic importance helped it remain the only major city in Virginia not recaptured by Union forces before the war's end.

Lynchburg anchors the Lynchburg metropolitan area, which lies near the geographic center of Virginia and is the fifth-largest metropolitan area in the state, with a population of 261,593. The city is a regional hub for education, home to several institutions of higher learning, including Liberty University, the University of Lynchburg, Randolph College, Virginia University of Lynchburg, and Central Virginia Community College.

== History ==
Monacan Indian Nation and other Siouan Tutelo-speaking tribes had lived in the area for over 10,000 years, driving the Virginia Algonquians eastward to the coastal areas. Explorer John Lederer visited one of the Siouan villages (Saponi) in 1670, on the Staunton River at Otter Creek, southwest of the present-day city, as did the Thomas Batts and Robert Fallam expedition in 1671.

Siouan peoples occupied this area until about 1702; they had become weakened because of high mortality from infectious diseases. The Seneca people, who were part of the Haudenosaunee (Iroquois) Confederacy based in New York, defeated them. The Seneca had ranged south while seeking new hunting grounds through the Shenandoah Valley to the West. At the Treaty of Albany in 1718, the Iroquois Five Nations ceded control of their land east of the Blue Ridge Mountains, including Lynchburg, to the Colony of Virginia; they confirmed this in 1721.

=== Founding and early growth ===
First settled by Anglo-Americans in 1757, Lynchburg was named for its founder, John Lynch. When about 17 years old, Lynch started a ferry service at a ford across the James River to carry traffic to and from New London, where his parents had settled. The "City of Seven Hills" quickly developed along the hills surrounding Lynch's Ferry.

In October 1786, Virginia's General Assembly recognized Lynchburg, the settlement by Lynch's Ferry on the James River. The James River Company had been incorporated the previous year (and President George Washington was given stock, which he donated to charity) in order to "improve" the river down to Richmond, which was growing and was named the new Commonwealth's capital. Shallow-draft James River bateau provided a relatively easy means of transportation through Lynchburg down to Richmond and eventually to the Atlantic Ocean. Rocks, downed trees, and flood debris were constant hazards, so their removal became expensive ongoing maintenance. Lynchburg became a tobacco trading, then commercial, and much later an industrial center.

Eventually the state built a canal and towpath along the river to make transportation by the waterway easier, and especially to provide a water route around the falls at Richmond, which prevented through navigation by boat. By 1812, U.S. Chief Justice John Marshall, who lived in Richmond, reported on the navigation difficulties and construction problems on the canal and towpath.

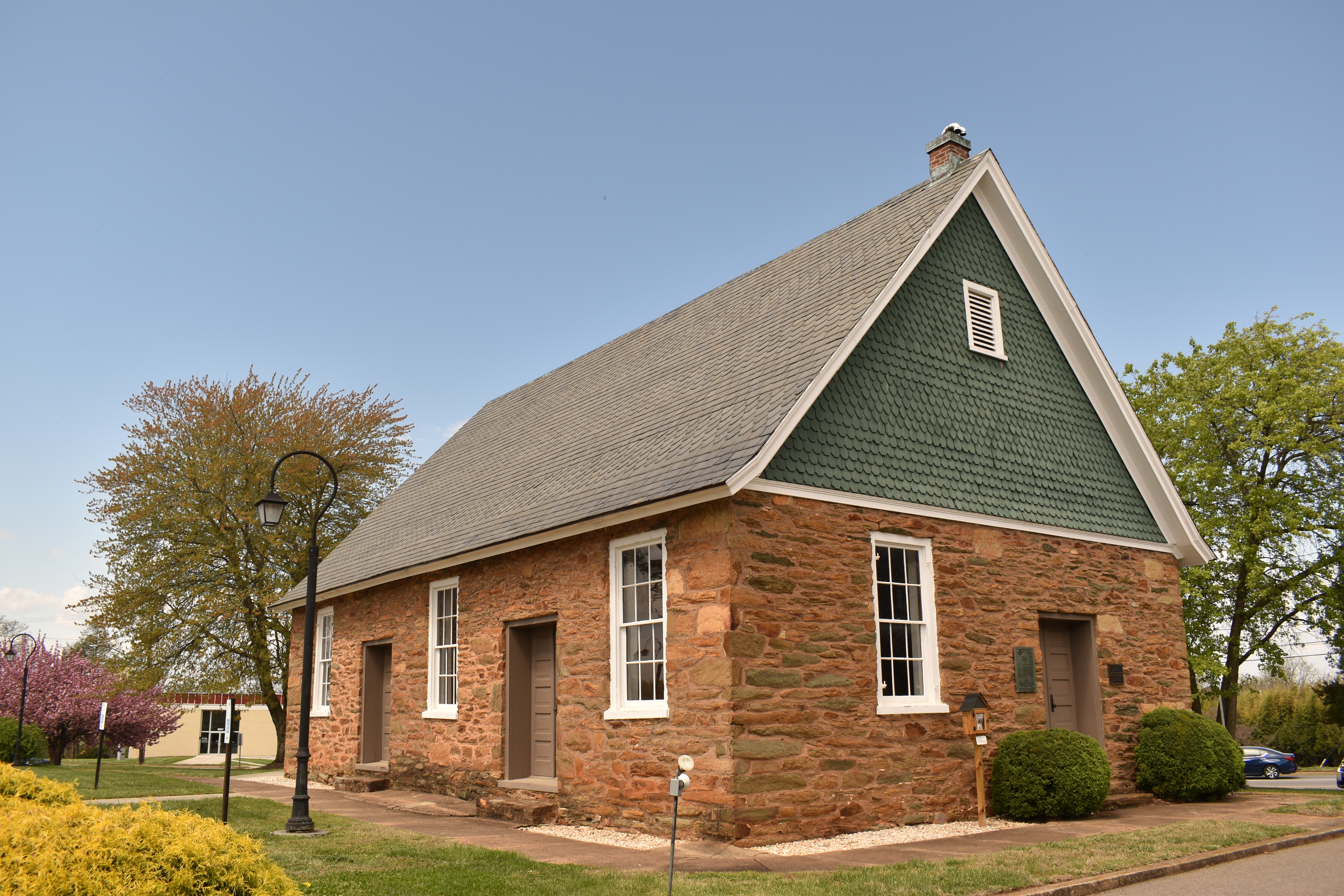
The restored South River Friends Meetinghouse, April 2024

The General Assembly recognized the settlement's growth by incorporating Lynchburg as a town on January 10, 1805; it was not incorporated as a city until 1852. In between, Lynch built Lynchburg's first bridge across the James River, a toll structure that replaced his ferry in 1812. A toll turnpike to Salem, Virginia was begun in 1817. Lynch died in 1820 and was buried in the burial ground of the South River Friends Meetinghouse. By the time of his death, many Quakers in the area had begun to abandon the town because of their moral opposition to slavery, which the city's economy had begun to rely upon. Lynch himself freed all of his slaves during his lifetime, including the slave who was suspected of killing his son. Presbyterians took over the grounds of the meetinghouse in 1899 and adapted it into their own church, later building a new church adjacent to the site. They later restored the Quaker meetinghouse to its historical appearance. The meetinghouse and burial ground are now preserved as a historic site.

To avoid the many visitors at Monticello, Thomas Jefferson in 1806 developed a plantation and house near Lynchburg, called Poplar Forest. He often visited the town, noting, "Nothing would give me greater pleasure than to be useful to the town of Lynchburg. I consider it as the most interesting spot in the state." In 1810, Jefferson wrote, "Lynchburg is perhaps the most rising place in the U.S.... It ranks now next to Richmond in importance...."

Early Lynchburg residents were not known for their religious enthusiasm. The established Church of England supposedly built a log church in 1765. In 1804, evangelist Lorenzo Dow wrote: "...where I spoke in the open air in what I conceived to be the seat of Satan's Kingdom. Lynchburg was a deadly place for the worship of God'." That referred to the lack of churches, which was corrected the following year. Itinerant Methodist Francis Asbury visited the town; Methodists built its first church in 1805. Lynchburg hosted the last Virginia Methodist Conference that bishop Asbury attended (February 20, 1815). As Lynchburg grew, prostitution and other "rowdy" activities became part of the urban mix of the river town. They were often ignored, if not accepted, particularly in a downtown area referred to as the "Buzzard's Roost." Methodist preacher and later bishop John Early became one of Lynchburg's civic leaders; unlike early Methodist preachers who had urged abolition of slavery during the Great Awakening, Early was of a later generation that had accommodated to this institution in the slave societies of the South.

On December 3, 1840, the James River and Kanawha Canal from Richmond reached Lynchburg. It was extended as far as Buchanan, Virginia in 1851, but never reached a tributary of the Ohio River as originally planned. Lynchburg's population exceeded 6,000 by 1840, and a water works system was built. Floods in 1842 and 1847 wreaked havoc with the canal and towpath. Both were repaired. Town businessmen began to lobby for a railroad, but Virginia's General Assembly refused to fund such construction. In 1848 civic boosters began selling subscriptions for the Lynchburg and Tennessee Railroad.

By the 1850s, Lynchburg (along with New Bedford, Massachusetts) was among the richest towns per capita in the US. Tobacco (including the manufacture of plug tobacco in factories using rented slave labor), slave-trading, general commerce, and iron and steel manufacturing powered the economy.

Railroads had become the wave of the future. Construction on the new Lynchburg and Tennessee railroad had begun in 1850 and a locomotive tested the track in 1852. A locomotive called the "Lynchburg" blew up in Forest, Virginia (near Poplar Forest) later that year, showing the new technology's dangers. By the Civil War, two more railroads had been built, including the South Side Railroad from Petersburg. It became known as the Atlantic, Mississippi and Ohio Railroad in 1870, then a line in the Norfolk and Western Railway, and last as part of the Norfolk Southern Railway. The Orange and Alexandria Railroad stopped in Lynchburg.

=== American Civil War ===
During the American Civil War, Lynchburg served as a Confederate transportation hub and supply depot. It had 30 hospitals, often placed in churches, hotels, and private homes.

In June 1864, Union forces of General David Hunter approached within 1-mile (1.6 km) as they drove south from the Shenandoah Valley. Confederate troops under General John McCausland harassed them. Meanwhile, the city's defenders hastily erected breastworks on Amherst Heights. Defenders were led by General John C. Breckinridge, who was an invalid from wounds received at the Battle of Cold Harbor. Union General Philip Sheridan appeared headed for Lynchburg on June 10, as he crossed the Chickahominy River and cut the Virginia Central Railroad. However, Confederate cavalry under General Wade Hampton, including the 2nd Virginia Cavalry from Lynchburg under General Thomas T. Munford, defeated his forces at the two-day Battle of Trevilian Station in Louisa County, and they withdrew. This permitted fast-marching troops under Confederate General Jubal Early to reach within four miles of Lynchburg on June 16 and tear up the tracks of the Orange and Alexandria Railroad to inhibit travel by Union reinforcements, while Confederate reinforcements straggled in from Charlottesville.

On June 18, 1864, in the Battle of Lynchburg, Early's combined forces, though outnumbered, repelled Union General Hunter's troops. Lynchburg's defenders had taken pains to create an impression that the Confederate forces within the city were much larger than they were in fact. For example, a train was continuously run up and down the tracks while drummers played and Lynchburg citizens cheered as if reinforcements were disembarking. Local prostitutes took part in the deception, misleading their Union clients about the large number of Confederate reinforcements. Narcissa Owen (Cherokee), wife of the president of the Lynchburg and Tennessee Railroad, later wrote about her similar deception of Union spies.

From April 6 to 10, 1865, Lynchburg served as the capital of Virginia after the Confederate government fled from Richmond. Governor William Smith and the Commonwealth's executive and legislative branches escaped to Lynchburg as Richmond surrendered on April 3. Gen. Robert E. Lee surrendered to Gen. Ulysses S. Grant at Appomattox Courthouse, roughly 20-mile (32 km) east of Lynchburg, ending the Civil War. Lynchburg surrendered on April 12, to Union General Ranald S. Mackenzie.

Ten days later, Confederate Brigadier General James Dearing died. He was a native of nearby Campbell County and descendant of John Lynch; he had been wounded on April 6 at High Bridge during that Appomattox campaign. Mackenzie had visited his wounded friend and former West Point classmate, easing the transition of power.

=== Post-Civil War recovery ===
The railroads that had driven Lynchburg's economy were destroyed by the war's end. The residents of the city deeply resented occupying forces under General John Irvin Gregg, and worked more readily with his affable successor General Newton Martin Curtis. Thomas J. Kirkpatrick became superintendent for the public education established under Virginia's Reconstruction-era legislature and Constitution of 1869, and built four new public schools. Previously, the only education for students from poor families was provided through St. Paul's Episcopal Church.

Floods in 1870 and 1877 destroyed the city's bridges (which were rebuilt) and the James River and Kanahwa Canal (which was not rebuilt). The towpath was used as the bed for laying the rails of the Richmond and Allegheny Railroad, a project conceived five decades earlier.

The city limits expanded in 1874. In 1881 that railroad was completed to Lynchburg, and another railroad reached it through the Shenandoah Valley. Lynchburg had a telegraph, about 15,000 residents, and the beginnings of a streetcar system. Many citizens, believing their city crowded enough, did not join the boosters who wanted Lynchburg to become the junction of that valley line and what became the Norfolk and Western Railroad, so the junction was moved to Big Lick. This later developed as the City of Roanoke.

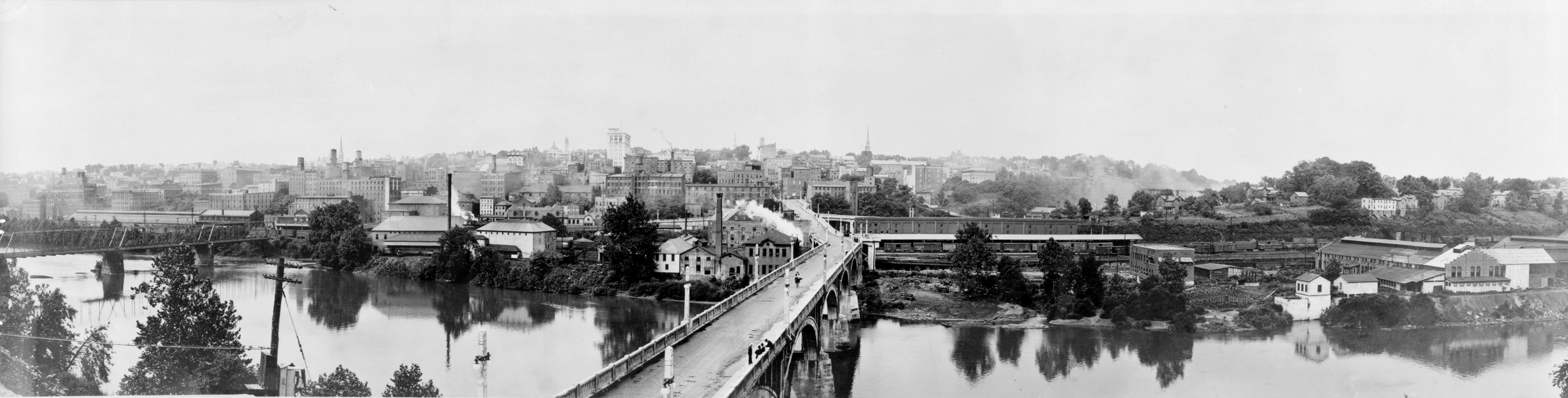
Lynchburg, c. 1919

In the latter 19th century, Lynchburg embraced manufacturing (the city being sometimes referred to as the "Pittsburgh of the South"). On a per capita basis, it became one of the wealthiest cities in the United States. In 1880, Lynchburg resident James Albert Bonsack invented the first cigarette-rolling machine. Shortly thereafter Dr. Charles Browne Fleet, a physician and pharmacological tinkerer, introduced the first micro-enema to be mass marketed over the counter. By the city's centennial in 1886, banking activity had increased sixfold over the 1860 level, which some attributed to slavery's demise. The Lynchburg Cotton Mill and Craddock-Terry Shoe Co., which would become the largest shoe manufacturer in the South, were founded in 1888. The Reusens hydroelectric dam began operating in 1903 and soon delivered more power.

In 1886, Virginia Baptists founded a training school, the Lynchburg Baptist Seminary. It began to offer a college-level program to African-American students in 1900. Now named the Virginia University of Lynchburg, it is the city's oldest institution of higher learning. Not far outside town, Randolph-Macon Woman's College and Sweet Briar College were founded as women's colleges in 1893 and 1901, respectively. In 1903, the Christian Church (Disciples of Christ) founded Lynchburg Christian College (later Lynchburg College) in what had been the Westover Hotel resort, which went bankrupt in the Panic of 1901. During the 2018–19 school year, the college's name was changed to the University of Lynchburg, reflecting its expansion of graduate-level programs and research. Lynchburg's first public library, the Jones Memorial Library, opened in 1907.

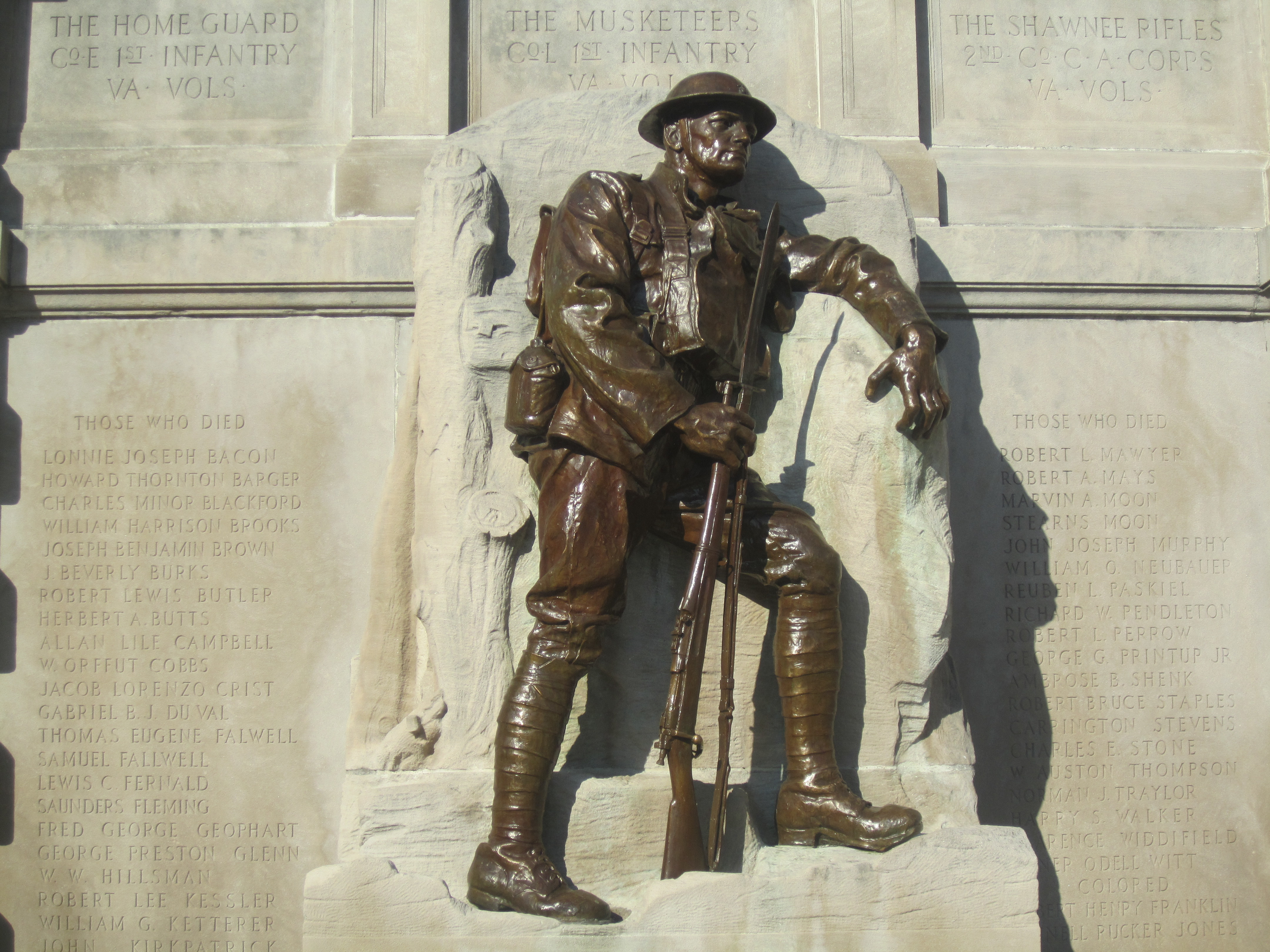
World War I Memorial in downtown Lynchburg

During World War I, the city's factories supported the war effort, and the area also supplied troops. The city powered through the Roaring Twenties and survived the Great Depression. Its first radio station, WLVA, began in 1930, and its airport opened in 1931. In 1938, the former fairgrounds were redeveloped as side-by-side baseball and football stadiums.

=== World War II and after ===
Lynchburg's factories again worked 24 hours daily during World War II. The Craddock-Terry Shoe Co. would be supported by contracts granted by the U.S. Government to create footwear for soldiers during the war. In 1955, both General Electric and Babcock & Wilcox built high technology factories in the area.

Lynchburg lost its bid to gain access to an interstate highway. In the late 1950s, interested citizens, including Virginia Senator Mosby G. Perrow Jr., asked the federal government to change its long-planned route for the interstate highway, now known as I-64, between Clifton Forge and Richmond.

Since the 1940s, maps of the federal interstate highway system showed a proposed northern route, bypassing the manufacturing centers at Lynchburg and Roanoke. But federal officials assured Virginia that the state would decide the route. Although initially favoring that northern route, Virginia's State Highway Commission eventually supported a southern route from Richmond via US-360 and US-460, which connected Lynchburg and Roanoke via US-220 from Roanoke to Clifton Forge, then continued west following US-60 into West Virginia. However, in July 1961, Governor J. Lindsay Almond and US Secretary of Commerce Luther Hodges announced that the route would not be changed. Lynchburg was left as the only city with a population in excess of 50,000 (at the time) that was not served by an interstate.

The Virginia State Colony for Epileptics and Feebleminded (now known as the Central Virginia Training School), was established outside Lynchburg in Madison Heights. For several decades throughout the mid-20th century, the state of Virginia authorized compulsory sterilization of the intellectually disabled for the purpose of eugenics. The operations were carried out at the institution. An estimated 8,300 Virginians were relocated to Lynchburg and sterilized there, making the city a "dumping ground" of sorts for the feeble-minded, poor, blind, epileptic, and those otherwise seen as genetically "unfit". Carrie Buck challenged the state sterilization, but it was finally upheld by the United States Supreme Court in Buck v. Bell. She was classified as "feeble-minded" and sterilized while a patient at the Virginia State Colony.

Sterilizations were carried out for 35 years until 1972, when the operations were halted. Later in the late 1970s, the American Civil Liberties Union filed a class-action lawsuit against the state of Virginia on behalf of the sterilization victims. In the settlement, victims received formal apologies from the state and counseling if they chose, but the judiciary denied requests for the state to pay for reverse sterilization operations. In 1994, Buck's sterilization and litigation were featured as a television drama, Against Her Will: The Carrie Buck Story. The Manic Street Preachers address the issue in their song "Virginia State Epileptic Colony" on their 2009 album Journal for Plague Lovers.

=== Modern revitalization ===
Liberty University, founded in 1971 as Lynchburg Baptist College and renamed in 1985, is one of the country's largest institutions of higher education and the largest employer in the Lynchburg region. The university states that it generates over $1 billion in economic impact to the Lynchburg area annually.

Lynchburg has ten recognized historic districts, four of them in the downtown residential area. Since 1971, 40 buildings have been individually listed on the National Register of Historic Places.

Downtown Lynchburg has undergone significant revitalization, with hundreds of new loft apartments created through adaptive reuse of historic warehouses and mills. Since 2000, downtown has attracted private investments of more than $110 million, and business activity increased by 205% from 2004 to 2014. In 2014, 75 new apartment units were added to downtown Lynchburg, with 155 further units under construction, increasing the number of housing units downtown by 48% from 2010 to 2014.

In 2015, the $5.8-million Lower Bluffwalk pedestrian street zone opened. Notable projects underway in downtown by the end of 2015 include the $25-million Virginian Hotel restoration project, a $16.6-million restoration of the Academy Center of the Arts, and $4.6-million expansion of Amazement Square Children's Museum.

=== Timeline ===
Timeline of Lynchburg, Virginia
- 1786 – Lynchburg founded.
- 1791 – Tobacco warehouse built.
- 1798 – South River Friends Meetinghouse built.
- 1805 – Town of Lynchburg incorporated.
- 1806
  - City Cemetery established.
  - Construction of Thomas Jefferson's Poplar Forest begins near Lynchburg.
- 1830
  - Elijah Fletcher becomes mayor.
  - Population: 4,630.
- 1840
  - James River and Kanawha Canal to Richmond opens.
  - Population: 6,395.
- 1850 – Population: 8,071.
- 1852
  - Virginia & Tennessee Railroad begins operating.
  - City of Lynchburg incorporated.
  - Lynchburg Daily Virginian newspaper begins publication.
- 1855 – Lynchburg Courthouse built.
- 1856 – Methodist Protestant Lynchburg College established.
- 1864 – June 17–18: Battle of Lynchburg fought near city during the American Civil War.
- 1866 – Southern Memorial Association founded.
- 1870 – September: Flood.
- 1879 – George D. Witt Shoe Corporation in business.
- 1880 – James Albert Bonsack invents cigarette rolling machine.
- 1886 – First Baptist Church built.
- 1888 – Virginia Theological Seminary founded.
- 1893 – Randolph-Macon Woman's College opens.
- 1895 – St. Paul's Church built.
- 1898 – "Confederate Infantryman" monument erected.
- 1900 – Population: 18,891.
- 1903 – Virginia Christian College founded.
- 1908 – Jones Memorial Library opens.
- 1912 – Equal Suffrage League formed.
- 1913 – Statue of John Warwick Daniel erected.
- 1920 – Little Theater established.
- 1928 – Monument Terrace built.
- 1930
  - WLVA radio begins broadcasting.
  - Population: 40,661.
- 1932 – Civic Art League founded.
- 1940 – City Stadium opens.
- 1953 – WLVA-TV (television) begins broadcasting.
- 1954 – Carter Glass Memorial Bridge opens.
- 1959 – Pittman Plaza shopping centre in business.
- 1966
  - Lynchburg Public Library opens.
  - Central Virginia Community College and Lynchburg Baseball Corporation established.
- 1971 – Lynchburg Baptist College (later Liberty University) founded.
- 1978 – Point of Honor house museum opens.
- 1980 – Population: 66,743.
- 1990 – President George H. W. Bush gives commencement speech at Liberty University.
- 1993 – Bob Goodlatte becomes U.S. representative for Virginia's 6th congressional district.
- 1995 – Lynchburg Hillcats baseball team active.
- 2000 – City website online (approximate date).
- 2010 – Population: 75,568.
- 2016 – Joan Foster becomes mayor.
- 2017 – President Donald Trump gives commencement speech at Liberty University.
- 2023 - Stephanie Reed becomes mayor.

== Geography ==
According to the United States Census Bureau, the city has a total area of 49.6 square miles (128.5 km^{2}), of which 49.2 square miles (127.4 km^{2}) is land and 0.5 square miles (1.3 km^{2}) (1.0%) is water.

Neighborhoods include Diamond Hill.

=== Climate ===
Lynchburg has a four-season humid subtropical climate (Köppen Cfa), with cool winters and hot, humid summers. The monthly daily average temperature ranges from 35.9 °F (2.2 °C) in January to 76.0 °F (24.4 °C) in July. Nights tend to be significantly cooler than days throughout much of the year due in part to the moderate elevation. In a typical year, there are 27.4 days with a high temperature 90 °F (32 °C) or above, and 6.2 days with a high of 32 °F (0 °C) or below. Snowfall averages 11.6 inches (29 cm) per season but this amount varies highly with each winter; the snowiest winter is 1995–96 with 56.8 in (144 cm) of snow, but the following winter recorded only trace amounts, the least on record. The average snowiest month is February which corresponds with the annual peak in nor'easter activity. The plant hardiness zone is 7b with an average annual extreme minimum air temperature of 5 °F (−15 °C).

Temperature extremes range from 106 °F (41 °C), recorded on July 10, 1936, down to −11 °F (−24 °C), recorded on February 20, 2015. However, several decades may pass between 100 and 0 °F (38 and −18 °C) readings, with the last such occurrences being July 8, 2012 and February 20, 2015, respectively.

Climate data for Lynchburg, Virginia (Lynchburg Regional Airport), 1991–2020 normals, (Note: Mean monthly maxima and minima (i.e. the expected highest and lowest temperature readings at any point during the year or given month) calculated based on data at said location from 1991 to 2020.) extremes 1893–present (Note: Official records for Lynchburg were kept at the Weather Bureau Office from January 1893 to July 1944, and at Lynchburg Regional since August 1944. For more information, see ThreadEx)
Month	Jan	Feb	Mar	Apr	May	Jun	Jul	Aug	Sep	Oct	Nov	Dec	Year
Record high °F (°C)	80 (27)	82 (28)	92 (33)	95 (35)	100 (38)	104 (40)	106 (41)	105 (41)	102 (39)	98 (37)	85 (29)	79 (26)	106 (41)
Mean maximum °F (°C)	66.8 (19.3)	69.7 (20.9)	78.8 (26.0)	85.7 (29.8)	88.8 (31.6)	93.1 (33.9)	95.2 (35.1)	93.8 (34.3)	90.4 (32.4)	84.3 (29.1)	74.9 (23.8)	68.1 (20.1)	96.0 (35.6)
Mean daily maximum °F (°C)	46.0 (7.8)	49.6 (9.8)	58.2 (14.6)	68.8 (20.4)	75.9 (24.4)	83.2 (28.4)	86.9 (30.5)	85.2 (29.6)	78.9 (26.1)	68.9 (20.5)	58.2 (14.6)	49.0 (9.4)	67.4 (19.7)
Daily mean °F (°C)	35.9 (2.2)	38.8 (3.8)	46.4 (8.0)	56.1 (13.4)	64.2 (17.9)	72.0 (22.2)	76.0 (24.4)	74.5 (23.6)	68.0 (20.0)	57.0 (13.9)	46.5 (8.1)	38.9 (3.8)	56.2 (13.4)
Mean daily minimum °F (°C)	25.8 (−3.4)	28.0 (−2.2)	34.6 (1.4)	43.5 (6.4)	52.5 (11.4)	60.7 (15.9)	65.0 (18.3)	63.8 (17.7)	57.1 (13.9)	45.1 (7.3)	34.8 (1.6)	28.9 (−1.7)	45.0 (7.2)
Mean minimum °F (°C)	7.5 (−13.6)	12.3 (−10.9)	18.3 (−7.6)	28.7 (−1.8)	38.0 (3.3)	49.5 (9.7)	56.0 (13.3)	54.5 (12.5)	43.4 (6.3)	29.9 (−1.2)	20.9 (−6.2)	14.5 (−9.7)	5.1 (−14.9)
Record low °F (°C)	−10 (−23)	−11 (−24)	5 (−15)	20 (−7)	30 (−1)	40 (4)	49 (9)	45 (7)	35 (2)	21 (−6)	8 (−13)	−4 (−20)	−11 (−24)
Average precipitation inches (mm)	3.46 (88)	2.91 (74)	3.76 (96)	3.45 (88)	3.98 (101)	3.82 (97)	4.19 (106)	3.22 (82)	3.96 (101)	3.12 (79)	3.39 (86)	3.50 (89)	42.76 (1,086)
Average snowfall inches (cm)	3.5 (8.9)	3.6 (9.1)	2.4 (6.1)	0.1 (0.25)	0.0 (0.0)	0.0 (0.0)	0.0 (0.0)	0.0 (0.0)	0.0 (0.0)	0.0 (0.0)	0.0 (0.0)	2.0 (5.1)	11.6 (29)
Average precipitation days (≥ 0.01 in)	9.9	9.5	11.1	10.2	12.1	10.9	11.8	9.7	8.5	7.7	8.1	9.4	118.9
Average snowy days (≥ 0.1 in)	1.7	1.8	1.2	0.1	0.0	0.0	0.0	0.0	0.0	0.0	0.0	0.9	5.7
Mean monthly sunshine hours	167.0	168.2	221.7	243.7	272.3	287.5	273.4	256.6	226.5	215.4	169.6	155.9	2,657.8
Percentage possible sunshine	54	56	60	62	62	65	61	61	61	62	55	52	60
Source: NOAA (sun 1961–1990)

=== Seven Hills ===
One of the most prominent nicknames of Lynchburg is the "City of Seven Hills." This is due to one prominent feature of its geography, the seven hills that are spread throughout the region. The seven hills are: College Hill, Garland Hill, Daniel's Hill, Federal Hill, Diamond Hill, White Rock Hill, and Franklin Hill.

=== Adjacent counties ===
- Amherst County – northeast
- Bedford County – west, northwest
- Campbell County – south, southeast

== Demographics ==
Historical population
Census	Pop.	Note	%±
1830	4,630		—
1840	6,395		38.1%
1850	8,071		26.2%
1860	6,853		−15.1%
1870	6,825		−0.4%
1880	15,959		133.8%
1890	19,709		23.5%
1900	18,891		−4.2%
1910	29,494		56.1%
1920	30,070		2.0%
1930	40,661		35.2%
1940	44,541		9.5%
1950	47,727		7.2%
1960	54,790		14.8%
1970	54,083		−1.3%
1980	66,743		23.4%
1990	66,049		−1.0%
2000	65,269		−1.2%
2010	75,568		15.8%
2020	79,009		4.6%
2025 (est.)	81,347	▲	3.0%
U.S. Decennial Census; 1790–1960 1900–1990; 1990–2000 2010 2020

=== Racial and ethnic composition ===
Lynchburg city, Virginia – Racial and ethnic composition Note: the US Census treats Hispanic/Latino as an ethnic category. This table excludes Latinos from the racial categories and assigns them to a separate category. Hispanics/Latinos may be of any race.
Race / Ethnicity (NH = Non-Hispanic)	Pop 1980	Pop 1990	Pop 2000	Pop 2010	Pop 2020	% 1980	% 1990	% 2000	% 2010	% 2020
White alone (NH)	50,125	47,591	43,108	47,574	47,654	75.10%	72.05%	66.05%	62.96%	60.31%
Black or African American alone (NH)	15,669	17,371	19,288	21,984	21,228	23.48%	26.30%	29.55%	29.09%	26.87%
Native American or Alaska Native alone (NH)	47	100	164	200	200	0.07%	0.15%	0.25%	0.26%	0.25%
Asian alone (NH)	357	488	830	1,852	1,752	0.53%	0.74%	1.27%	2.45%	2.22%
Native Hawaiian or Pacific Islander alone (NH)	x	x	26	27	34	x	x	0.04%	0.04%	0.04%
Other race alone (NH)	93	23	128	184	669	0.14%	0.03%	0.20%	0.24%	0.85%
Mixed race or Multiracial (NH)	x	x	847	1,447	3,592	x	x	1.30%	1.91%	4.55%
Hispanic or Latino (any race)	452	476	878	2,300	3,880	0.68%	0.72%	1.35%	3.04%	4.91%
Total	66,743	66,049	65,269	75,568	79,009	100.00%	100.00%	100.00%	100.00%	100.00%

=== 2020 census ===
As of the 2020 census, Lynchburg had a population of 79,009. The median age was 31.0 years. 18.5% of residents were under the age of 18 and 16.2% of residents were 65 years of age or older. For every 100 females there were 87.5 males, and for every 100 females age 18 and over there were 83.9 males age 18 and over.

98.4% of residents lived in urban areas, while 1.6% lived in rural areas.

There were 30,269 households in Lynchburg, of which 25.5% had children under the age of 18 living in them. Of all households, 35.8% were married-couple households, 20.9% were households with a male householder and no spouse or partner present, and 37.1% were households with a female householder and no spouse or partner present. About 34.6% of all households were made up of individuals and 13.5% had someone living alone who was 65 years of age or older.

There were 33,832 housing units, of which 10.5% were vacant. The homeowner vacancy rate was 1.9% and the rental vacancy rate was 9.3%.

Racial composition as of the 2020 census
Race	Number	Percent
White	48,502	61.4%
Black or African American	21,453	27.2%
American Indian and Alaska Native	243	0.3%
Asian	1,766	2.2%
Native Hawaiian and Other Pacific Islander	41	0.1%
Some other race	2,400	3.0%
Two or more races	4,604	5.8%
Hispanic or Latino (of any race)	3,880	4.9%

=== 2010 census ===
As of the 2010 census, there were 75,568 people, 25,477 households, and 31,992 families residing in the city. The population density was 1,321.5 people per square mile (510.2 people/km^{2}). There were 27,640 housing units at an average density of 559.6 units per square mile (216.1 units/km^{2}). The racial makeup of the city was 63.0% White, 29.3% African American, 0.2% Native American, 2.5% Asian, 0.04% Pacific Islander, 0.63% from other races, and 1.7% from two or more races. Hispanic or Latino of any race were 3.0% of the population.

There were 25,477 households, out of which 27.8% had children under the age of 18 living with them, 41.6% were married couples living together, 16.0% had a female householder with no husband present, and 38.8% were non-families. 32.7% of all households were made up of individuals, and 12.9% had someone living alone who was 65 years of age or older. The average household size was 2.30 and the average family size was 2.92.

The age distribution of the city had: 22.1% under the age of 18, 15.5% from 18 to 24, 25.3% from 25 to 44, 20.8% from 45 to 64, and 16.3% who were 65 years of age or older. The median age was 35 years. For every 100 females, there were 84.2 males. For every 100 females aged 18 and over, there were 79.1 males.

The median income for a household in the city was $32,234, and the median income for a family was $40,844. Males had a median income of $31,390 versus $22,431 for females. The per capita income for the city was $18,263. About 12.3% of families and 15.9% of the population were below the poverty line, including 22.4% of those under age 18 and 10.7% of those age 65 or over.

Lynchburg ranks below the 2006 median annual household income for the U.S. as a whole, which was $48,200, according to the US Census Bureau.

In 2009, almost 27% of Lynchburg children lived in poverty. The state average that year was 14%.

== Economy ==
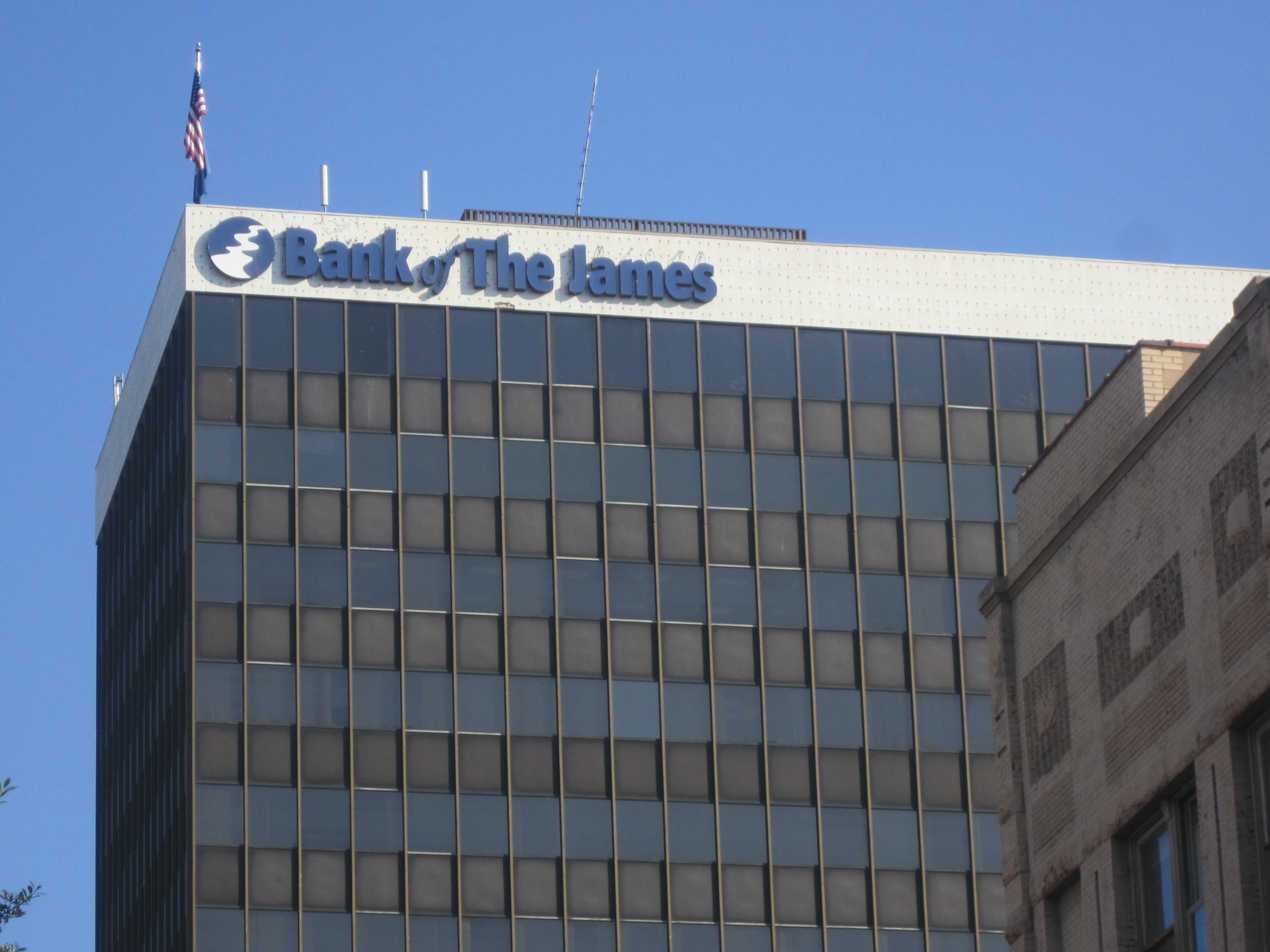
Bank of the James in Lynchburg

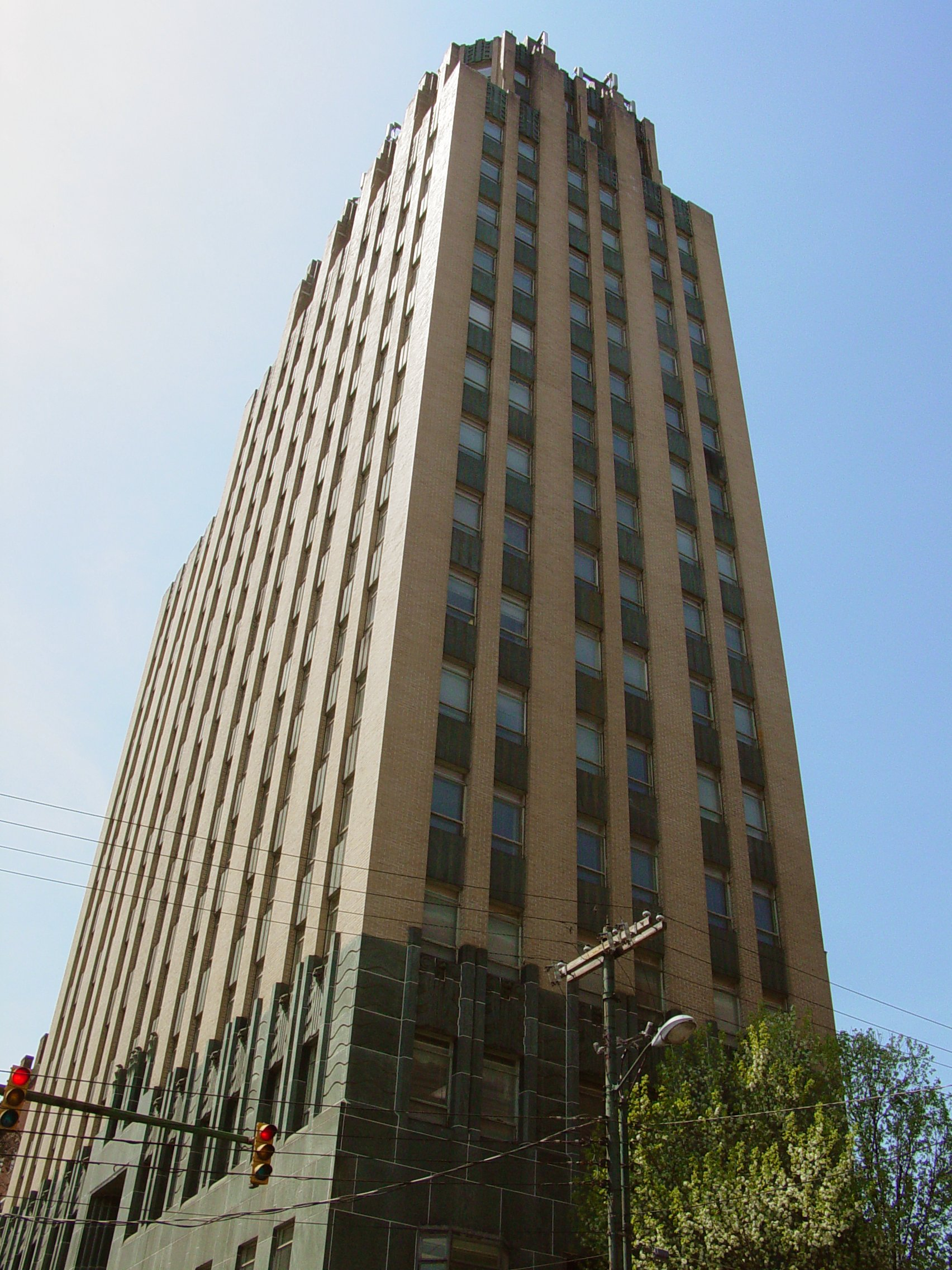
Allied Arts Building in Downtown Lynchburg, completed in 1931

Of Virginia's larger metro areas, Forbes Magazine ranked Lynchburg the fifth best place in Virginia for business in 2006, with Virginia being the best state in the country for business. In the same survey, Lynchburg achieved the rank of 109th in the nation.

Industries within the Lynchburg MSA include nuclear technology, pharmaceuticals, and material handling. A diversity of small businesses with the region has helped maintain a stable economy and has minimized the impacts of nation-wide economic downturns.

== Arts and culture ==
=== Performing arts ===
- Academy Center of the Arts – Greater Lynchburg's central venue for arts, culture, and community programming, housed in the former Academy of Music.
- Commerce Street Theater – A downtown venue for local theater productions.
- Lynchburg Symphony Orchestra – Founded in 1983, the orchestra presents a wide range of musical performances, including classical, patriotic, and popular repertoire.
- Opera on the James – Since 2005, this company has staged grand a chamber operas, contemporary works, family performances, and outreach programs, featuring regional and national artists.
- Renaissance Theater Company – The region's longest-running community theater, operating for over 25 years.
- Tower Theater – Liberty University's on-campus performing arts venue that hosts the Alluvion Stage Company.
- Wolfbane Productions – An award-winning performing arts company known for year-round cultural events and live performances.

=== Visual arts ===
- Daura Museum of Art – Located on the campus of the University of Lynchburg, this museum features year-round rotating art exhibits.
- Lynchburg Art Club – Established in 1895, the club supports regional artists and exhibitions.
- Maier Museum of Art at Randolph College – This art museum houses a collection of 19th- and 20th-century American art.
- Riverviews Artspace – A nonprofit contemporary art organization offering exhibitions, multi-disciplinary programming, and events.

=== Historic sites and museums ===
Lynchburg has several local and state-designated historic districts: Court House Hill–Downtown, Daniel's Hill, Diamond Hill, Fifth Street, Federal Hill, Garland Hill, Kemper Street, Lower Basin, Pierce Street, Rivermont, and Twelfth Street.

- Amazement Square – Central Virginia's first hands-on children's museum, located in the J. W. Wood Building.
- Anne Spencer House and Garden Museum – The home of Harlem Renaissance poet Anne Spencer, who hosted numerous civil rights leaders in her home throughout her life.
- Lynchburg Museum – Located in the Lynchburg Courthouse, this museum preserves artifacts and archival material from the city's history and presents them in rotating exhibitions.
- Fort Early and Jubal Early Monument – An earthen fort that was critical during the Battle of Lynchburg, now primarily used as an event space.
- Legacy Museum of African American History – A museum featuring rotating exhibits and programs on local African American history and culture.
- Miller-Claytor House – Lynchburg's only remaining 18th-century townhouse that now serves as a historic exhibit at the entrance of Riverside Park.
- Monument Terrace – The architectural centerpiece of downtown Lynchburg that honors citizens who fought in the Civil War, Spanish-American War, World Wars I and II, the Korean War, the Vietnam War, and the wars of the modern era.
- National Civil War Chaplains Museum –
- Old City Cemetery – Established in 1806, this is Lynchburg's most visited historic site and contains one of the largest public collections of heirloom roses in Virginia.
- Point of Honor – An early 19th-century plantation with connections to the Langhorne family.
- Sandusky House – A Federal style mansion that was used as the Union headquarters during the Battle of Lynchburg.
- Trails of Blackwater Creek – A network of paved and unpaved trails that partially follow defunct railroad tracks throughout the city.

=== Regional points of interest ===
- Appomattox Court House National Historical Park – The site of the Battle of Appomattox Court House where the surrender of the Confederate Army under Robert E. Lee to Union commander Ulysses S. Grant took place, effectively ending the American Civil War.
- Crabtree Falls – Located just off the Blue Ridge Parkway, this is the longest waterfall east of the Mississippi River.
- National D-Day Memorial – Memorial to commemorate those who served the United States during the D-Day Invasion of Normandy.
- Peaks of Otter – Three mountain peaks in the Blue Ridge Mountains that are prominently visible throughout much of Lynchburg.
- Poplar Forest – Thomas Jefferson's retreat home, featuring ongoing archaeolgoical work and restoration efforts.
- Smith Mountain Lake State Park – The largest lake contained entirely within Virginia, with over 500 miles of shoreline.

== Sports and recreation ==
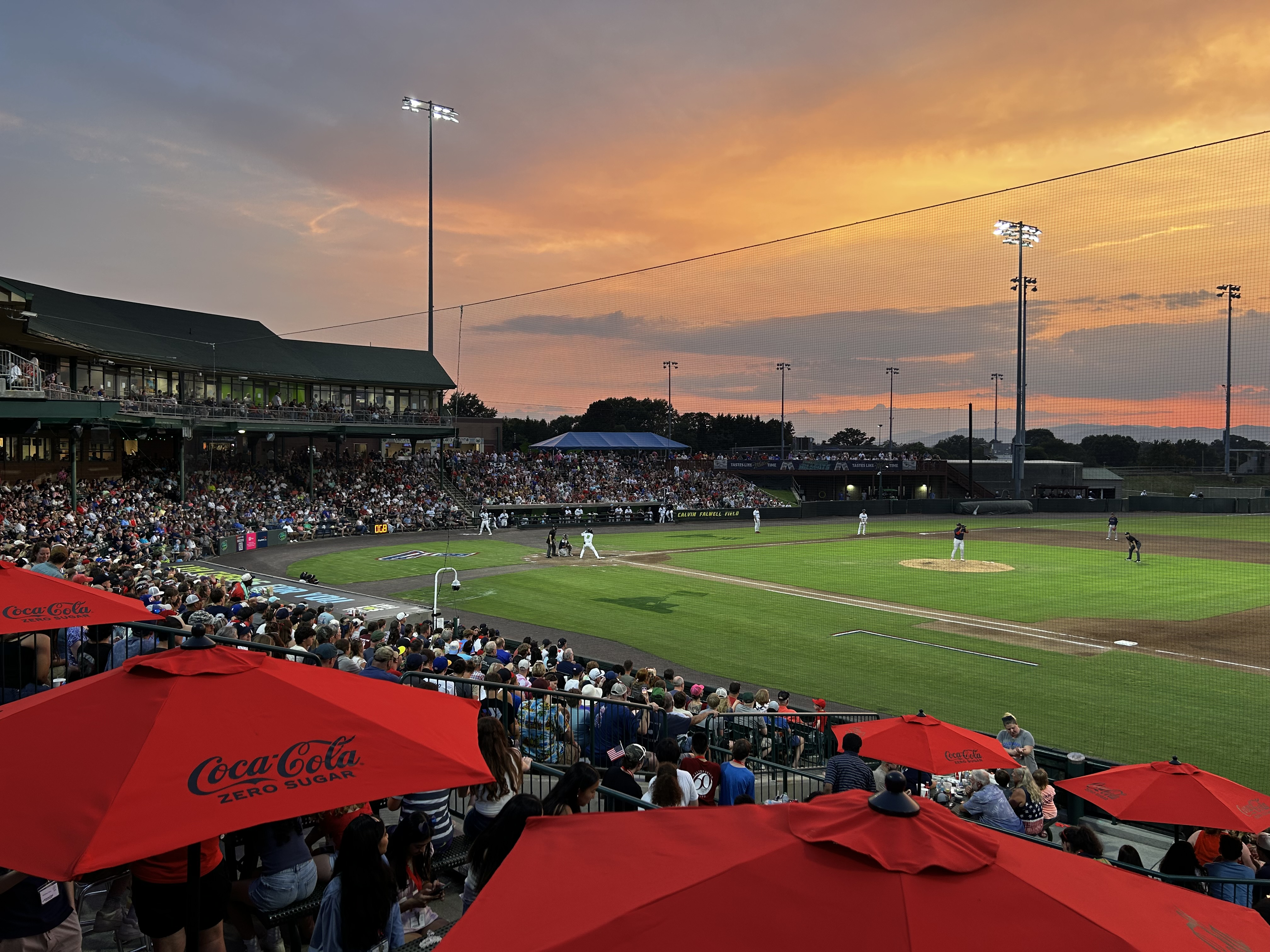
Lynchburg City Stadium, home of the Hill City Howlers

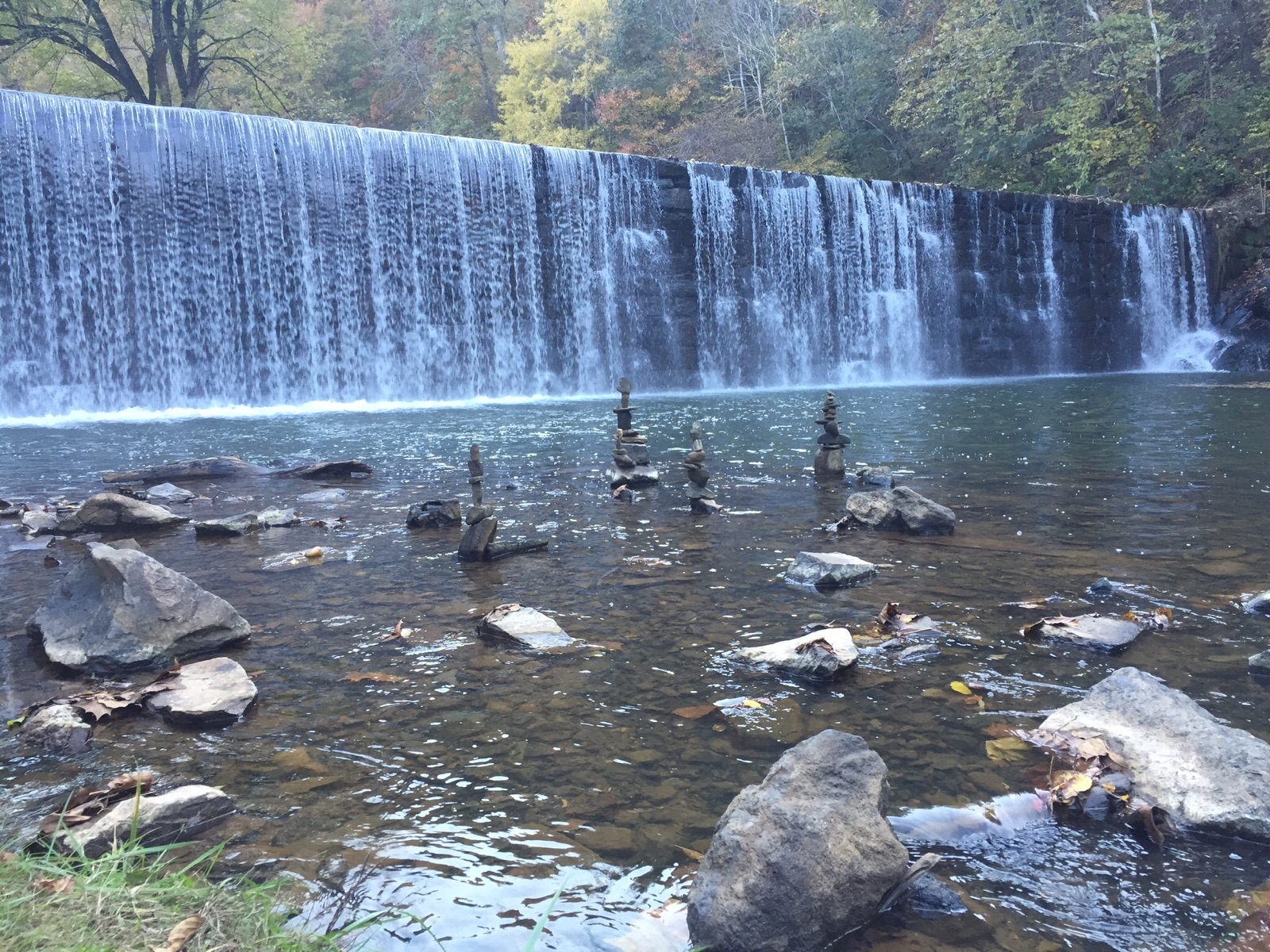
Hollins Mill Waterfall on the Blackwater Creek Greenway, James River Heritage Trail

Lynchburg is home to sporting events and organizations including:

- The Virginia 10 Miler road race, held annually since 1974, one of the oldest 10 mile races in the U.S. Now the Moore & Giles Virginia 10 Miler, the race has hosted some of the best distance runners in the world, including Rod Dixon (record holder with 46:50 in 1981), Bill Rodgers, Frank Shorter, Lasse Viren, and Grete Waitz, among others. It continues to attract elite international runners. The event also includes a four mile race.
- Blackwater Rugby Club: a local Men's Division III rugby club, part of the Capitol Rugby Union of USA Rugby.
- 7 Hills Hash House Harriers: The local chapter of an international group of non-competitive running, social and drinking clubs.
- Hiking areas include the Appalachian Trail, Peaks of Otter, Apple Orchard Falls Trail, Blackwater Creek Natural Area, Liberty Mountain Trail System, Crabtree Falls, Holliday Lake, Mount Pleasant National Scenic Holliday Lake, and Otter Creek Trail.
- Liberty Flames: An NCAA Division I department of athletics competing in 20 sports. They are a member of Conference USA.
- University of Lynchburg: The Hornets are an NCAA Division III school competing in 13 sports, as a member of the Old Dominion Athletic Conference (ODAC).
- Hill City Howlers: A Class Single-A professional baseball team in the Carolina League. They are affiliated with the Cleveland Guardians of the American League.
- Liberty Mountain SnowFlex Centre: A synthetic ski slope featuring Snowflex, located near Liberty University. It includes beginner, intermediate and advanced slopes for year-round skiing, snowboarding, and inner-tubing. It is the first of its kind in the United States.

== Government ==
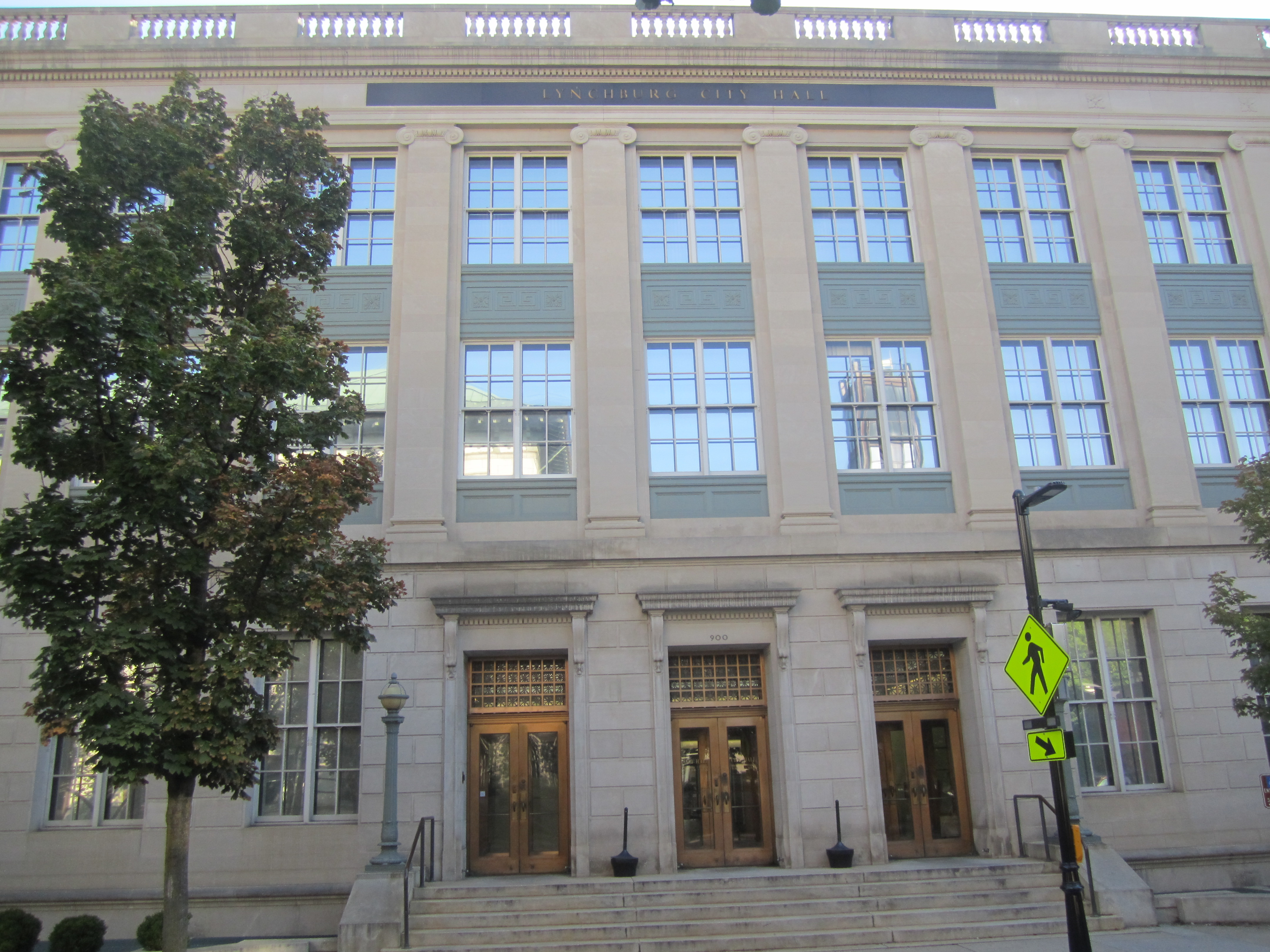
Lynchburg City Hall

Lynchburg uses a council-manager system.

=== City Council ===
The Lynchburg City Council is composed of seven members that each serve a four-year term, which are staggered and occur in November of even-numbered years. There are four wards that elect a member; the remaining three are elected in at-large elections in which the top three candidates obtain a seat. From among its members, council chooses a Mayor and Vice Mayor by simple majority vote, who each serve for 2 years.

The City Council is also responsible for appointing a city manager, city attorney, and city clerk.

The most recent Council elections were held in 2024, in which Republicans expanded their majority from 5-2 to 6-1.

==== Members ====
- Ward I: Jacqueline Timmer
- Ward II: Sterling A. Wilder
- Ward III: Curt Diemer (Vice Mayor)
- Ward IV: Chris Faraldi
- At-Large: Marty Misjuns
- At-Large: Stephanie Reed
- At-Large: Larry Taylor (Mayor)

=== List of mayors ===
1. John Wiatt, 1806
2. Roderick Taliaferro, 1807
3. Samuel J. Harrison, 1808
4. John Lynch Jr., 1809
5. M. Lambert, 1810
6. John Schoolfield, 1811
7. James Stewart, 1812
8. Robert Morris, 1813
9. Samuel J. Harrison, 1814
10. James Stewart, 1815
11. John M. Gordon, 1816
12. Samuel J. Harrison, 1817
13. William Morgan, 1818
14. James Stewart, 1819
15. John Thurman, 1820
16. Micajah Davis, 1821
17. John Hancock, 1822
18. Thomas A. Holcombe, 1823
19. Albon McDaniel, 1824
20. John Victor, 1825
21. Albon McDaniel, 1826
22. Christopher Winfree, 1827
23. Albon McDaniel, 1828
24. Ammon Hancock, 1829
25. Elijah Fletcher, 1830
26. John R. D. Payne, 1831
27. Elijah Fletcher, 1833
28. John M. Warwick, 1833
29. Henry M. Didlake, 1834
30. Samuel J. Wiatt, 1835
31. Pleasant Labby, 1836
32. Ammon Hancock, 1837
33. Martin W. Davenport, 1838
34. John R. D. Payne, 1839
35. Samuel Nowlin, 1840
36. Ammon Hancock, 1841
37. Henry M. Didlake, 1842
38. Edwin Mathews, 1843
39. David W. Burton, 1844
40. M. Hart, 1845
41. Henry M. Didlake, 1846
42. Daniel J. Warwick, 1847
43. Henry 0 Schoolfield, 1848
44. Edwin Mathews, 1849
45. Henry M. Didlake, 1850
46. William D. Branch, 1851
47. Albon McDaniel, 1869
48. James M. Cobbs, 1870
49. George H. Burch, 1872
50. Samuel A. Bailey, 1876
51. Samuel Griffin Wingfield, 1880
52. A. H. Pettigrew, 1882
53. Nathaniel Clayton Manson Jr., 1884–1891
54. Robert D. Yancey, circa 1900
55. Royston Jester Jr., circa 1918
56. Unknown
57. L. E. Litchford, circa 1937
58. Clarence G. Burton, 1946–1948
59. Jerome V. Morrison, c. 1952
60. John L. Suttenfield, c. 1953–1956
61. Leighton B. Dodd, c. 1973
62. Elliott Shearer, c. 1982
63. Jimmie Bryan, c. 1986
64. Unknown
65. M.W. "Teedy" Thornhill Jr., 1991–1992
66. James S. Whitaker, 1994–1998
67. Carl B. Hutcherson Jr., c. 2002–2005
68. Michael Gillette, c. 2015
69. Joan Foster, 2016–2018
70. Treney Tweedy, 2018–2020
71. MaryJane Dolan, 2020–2022
72. Stephanie Reed, 2023–2025
73. Larry Taylor, 2025–present

United States presidential election results for Lynchburg, Virginia
Year	Republican		Democratic		Third party(ies)	
Year	No.	%	No.	%	No.	%
1880	861	38.06%	1,400	61.89%	1	0.04%
1884	1,760	47.75%	1,926	52.25%	0	0.00%
1888	1,796	46.52%	2,054	53.20%	11	0.28%
1892	1,358	35.63%	2,422	63.55%	31	0.81%
1896	1,647	48.92%	1,657	49.21%	63	1.87%
1900	660	37.65%	1,081	61.67%	12	0.68%
1904	292	22.44%	995	76.48%	14	1.08%
1908	473	32.64%	962	66.39%	14	0.97%
1912	111	6.03%	1,487	80.82%	242	13.15%
1916	353	19.16%	1,465	79.53%	24	1.30%
1920	609	22.30%	2,096	76.75%	26	0.95%
1924	606	21.49%	2,086	73.97%	128	4.54%
1928	2,730	57.88%	1,987	42.12%	0	0.00%
1932	1,200	24.31%	3,656	74.07%	80	1.62%
1936	1,373	26.96%	3,697	72.60%	22	0.43%
1940	1,966	29.65%	4,656	70.22%	9	0.14%
1944	2,396	35.69%	4,302	64.08%	15	0.22%
1948	2,373	35.17%	2,480	36.76%	1,894	28.07%
1952	7,090	64.75%	3,848	35.14%	11	0.10%
1956	6,806	64.81%	3,362	32.01%	334	3.18%
1960	7,271	59.33%	4,961	40.48%	24	0.20%
1964	10,044	59.66%	6,758	40.14%	32	0.19%
1968	9,943	54.34%	4,305	23.53%	4,051	22.14%
1972	13,259	74.11%	4,208	23.52%	423	2.36%
1976	14,564	61.18%	8,227	34.56%	1,013	4.26%
1980	15,245	62.44%	7,783	31.88%	1,389	5.69%
1984	18,047	67.41%	8,542	31.91%	183	0.68%
1988	15,323	64.04%	8,279	34.60%	324	1.35%
1992	12,518	50.13%	9,587	38.40%	2,864	11.47%
1996	11,441	49.72%	10,281	44.68%	1,290	5.61%
2000	12,518	53.25%	10,374	44.13%	614	2.61%
2004	14,400	54.67%	11,727	44.52%	213	0.81%
2008	17,638	51.36%	16,269	47.37%	434	1.26%
2012	19,806	54.34%	15,948	43.76%	694	1.90%
2016	17,982	50.41%	14,792	41.47%	2,897	8.12%
2020	17,097	47.02%	18,048	49.63%	1,218	3.35%
2024	19,574	52.87%	16,664	45.01%	785	2.12%

=== State and national politics ===
Lynchburg has traditionally been a conservative stronghold. This predates the influence of Liberty University; it was one of the first areas of the state where the old-line Byrd Democrats began splitting their tickets at the national level in the 1950s. However, conservative Democrats continued to hold most local offices well into the 1970s.

However, the Democratic Party has seen a gradual increase in popularity in the city since the 1990s, and Lynchburg's political atmosphere has become increasingly moderate. In the 2020 United States presidential election, a plurality of voters in Lynchburg voted for Democratic challenger Joe Biden over Republican incumbent Donald Trump. Biden was the first Democrat to carry Lynchburg since Harry S. Truman in 1948.

Trump flipped the city back in 2024, though he won it by a slightly smaller margin than in 2016.

=== Local politics ===
There are two factions in Lynchburg Republican Party politics. On Council, Misjuns, Diemer, Timmer, and Taylor represent the conservative wing, whereas Reed and Faraldi represent the more moderate wing.

Some members of the Republican party in the city report not feeling represented by the city's party committee due to infighting and a culture of purity testing.

==== Primaries ====
In 2021, the General Assembly had passed Helmer's Law, which essentially mandates state-run primaries in that it requires the provision of absentee voting for certain classes of voters. It also passed a law moving municipal elections from May to November, with the intention of increasing turnout, and arguably among Democrats especially, as these types of moves are more likely to increase turnout among members of that party. Yet, the first November election in Lynchburg led to an increase in the Republican majority from 5-2 to 6-1.

In 2024, Lynchburg Republicans attempted to hold a firehouse primary, before being told by then-Attorney General Jason Miyares that there was no practical way to stay in compliance with the new law, although there may be a theoretical way. Faraldi, a moderate, won that year.

In 2026, incumbents Reed and Taylor were on the ballot, along with a non-incumbent, Chris Boswell, running together in a faction entitled "Team Lynchburg." Incumbent Misjuns and other candidates also signed up to represent the other faction.

On May 30, 2026, the party held a firehouse primary, in which voters had to pledge their "accordance with the principles of the Republican Party," and, if asked, express their intent in writing to support all of the Republican nominees. The party used this method as it wished to prevent non-Republicans from voting in their primary, but this method went up against Helmer's Law given that the system did not allow for absentee voting. It also did not allow for early voting. Further, it used ranked-choice voting, a method against which the Lynchburg Republican committee had written a statement in 2023. The state party offered changes to the ranked-choice firehouse plan that had been adopted in mid-March 2026, leading to a system that was more similar to standard-ranked choice voting and removed a majoritarian requirement.

Reed alleged that the primary being at a single location and taking place between 8 am and 3 pm limited the ability of many to participate. Reed's criticism of the process led to calls for a review of her party loyalty by the state committee. However, Jeff Ryer, the chair of the state party, said that she would not be removed from the ballot as this was not their practice.

Dan Helmer sent a letter to Attorney General Jay Jones requesting information about the legality of this method. As of April 3, 2026, a response hadn't been given.

== Education ==
=== Colleges and universities ===
==== Public colleges ====
- Central Virginia Community College

==== Private schools ====
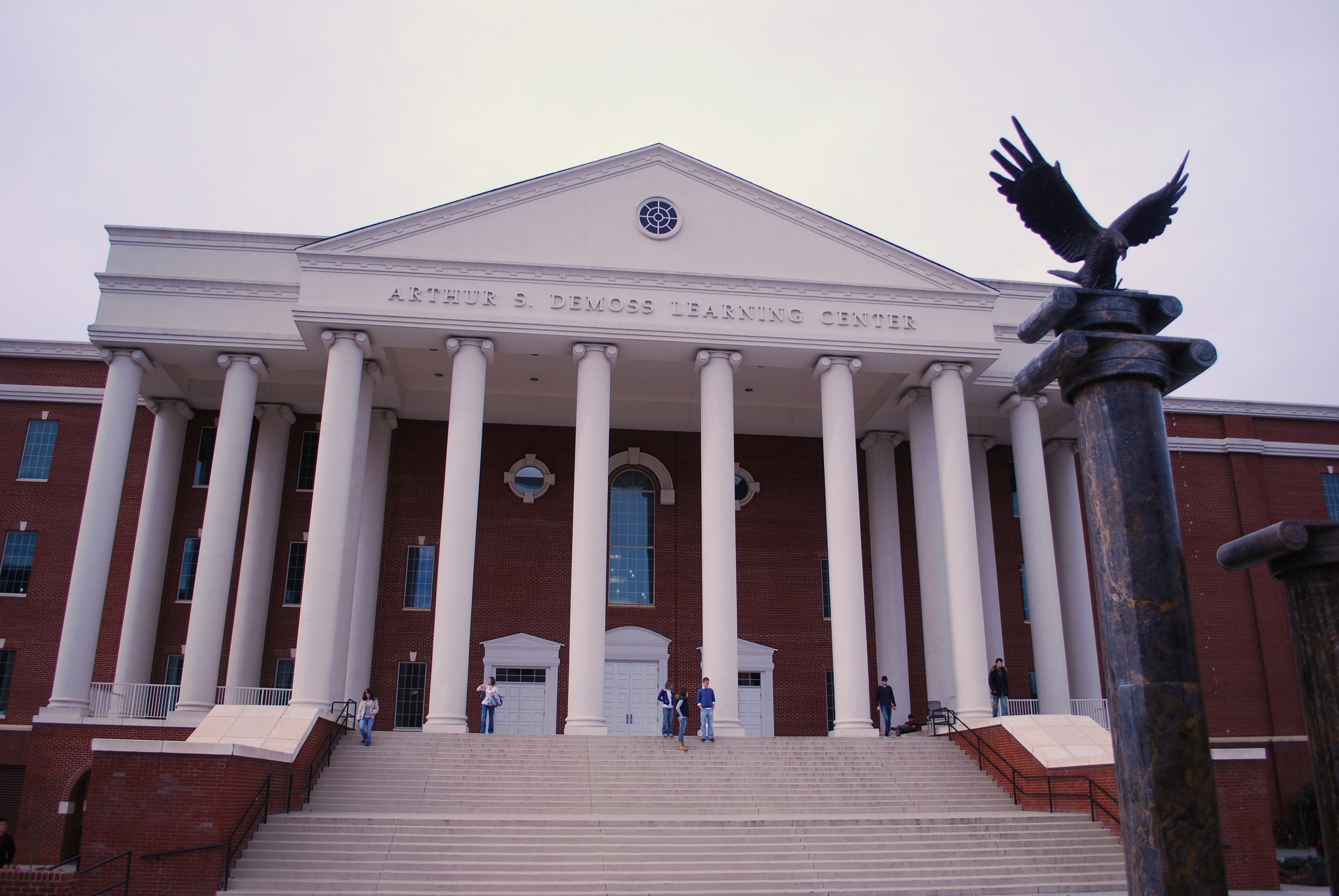
DeMoss Learning Center at Liberty University

- Liberty University and Liberty University Online Academy (LUOA)
- University of Lynchburg
- Randolph College
- Virginia University of Lynchburg
- Sweet Briar College (located in nearby Sweet Briar, Virginia)

=== Primary and secondary schools ===
==== Public schools ====
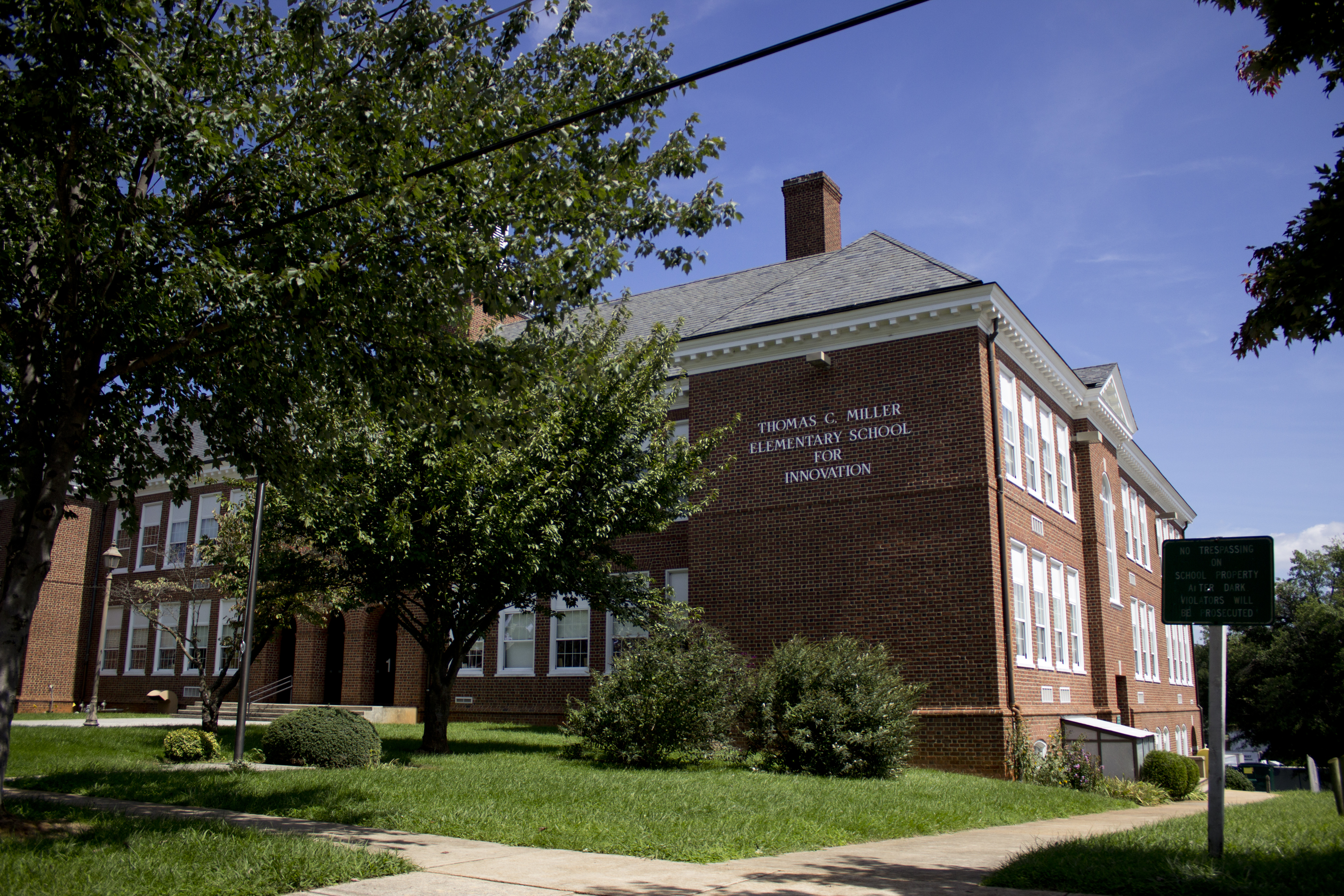
Thomas C. Miller Elementary School for Innovation

The city is served by the Lynchburg City Public Schools system, which is overseen by the Lynchburg City School Board, which is appointed by the Lynchburg City Council.

- E. C. Glass High School – 2111 Memorial Ave
- Heritage High School – 3020 Wards Ferry Rd
- Linkhorne Middle School – 2525 Linkhorne Dr
- Paul Laurence Dunbar Middle School – 1208 Polk St
- Sandusky Middle School – 805 Chinook Place
- William Marvin Bass Elementary School
- Bedford Hills Elementary School
- Dearington Elementary School for Innovation
- Heritage Elementary School
- Linkhorne Elementary School
- Paul M. Munro Elementary School
- Perrymont Elementary School
- Robert S. Payne Elementary School
- Sandusky Elementary School
- Sheffield Elementary School
- Thomas C. Miller Elementary School for Innovation

Lynchburg is also home to the Central Virginia Governor's School for Science and Technology located in Heritage High School. This magnet school consists of juniors and seniors selected from each of the Lynchburg-area high schools. As one of eighteen Governor's Schools in Virginia, the Central Virginia Governor's School focuses on infusing technology into both the math and science curriculum.

==== Private schools ====
The city is also home to a number of religious and non-religious private schools, including Appomattox Christian Academy, Desmond T Doss Christian Academy, James River Day School, Liberty Christian Academy, New Covenant Classical Christian School, Timberlake Christian Academy, Virginia Episcopal School, and New Vistas School.

== Media ==
The News & Advance is Lynchburg's daily newspaper that serves the Central Virginia region, owned by Lee Enterprises. Lynchburg shares a television and radio market with Roanoke. Stations based in the city include WSET-TV, WSLS-TV, and WWCW. Numerous radio stations are licensed to Lynchburg, including WJJX, WLNI, WRVL, WRXT and WYYD.

== Health care ==
- Centra Lynchburg General Hospital
- Centra Virginia Baptist Hospital
- Community Health Center

== Infrastructure ==
=== Water, sewer, and stormwater ===
Lynchburg's water system is the second-oldest publicly-owned system in the country and has one of the oldest cast-iron pipes still in use in the United States. There are over 455 miles of pipes in operation, and the utilities department has sought to become more proactive about its replacement of the pipes. Rather than reacting to emergencies, they are seeking to proactively replace 1% of the pipes every year.

Part of Lynchburg's storrmwater and sewer system feeds into a Combined Sewer Overflow, the impacts of which the $104 million Blackwater CSO project is seeking to mitigate. It is the largest capital improvement project in the city's history, and roughly 3/4 of the cost has been funded by grants. From 1979 to 2014, the city worked to separate the two systems, but since 2015, the city has shifted to moving the remaining outflows to the new pipe built by the project, which will bring the sewer and stormwater into a new treatment facility.

=== Transportation ===
==== Local ====
The Greater Lynchburg Transit Company (GLTC) operates the local public transport bus service within the city. The GLTC additionally provides the shuttle bus service on the Liberty University campus.

The GLTC selected a property directly across from Lynchburg-Kemper Street Station as its top choice of sites upon which to build the new transfer center for their network of public buses. They were interested in facilitating intermodal connections between GLTC buses and the intercity bus and rail services which operate from that location. The project was completed and opened to the public on June 16, 2014.

On August 23, 2017, the GLTC launched The Hopper, a free downtown circulator bus with a $479,348 grant from the Virginia Smart Scale program. On June 29, 2019, the GLTC ended service for The Hopper due to "consistently low ridership" and the expiration of a $117,820 state grant that covered operating costs.

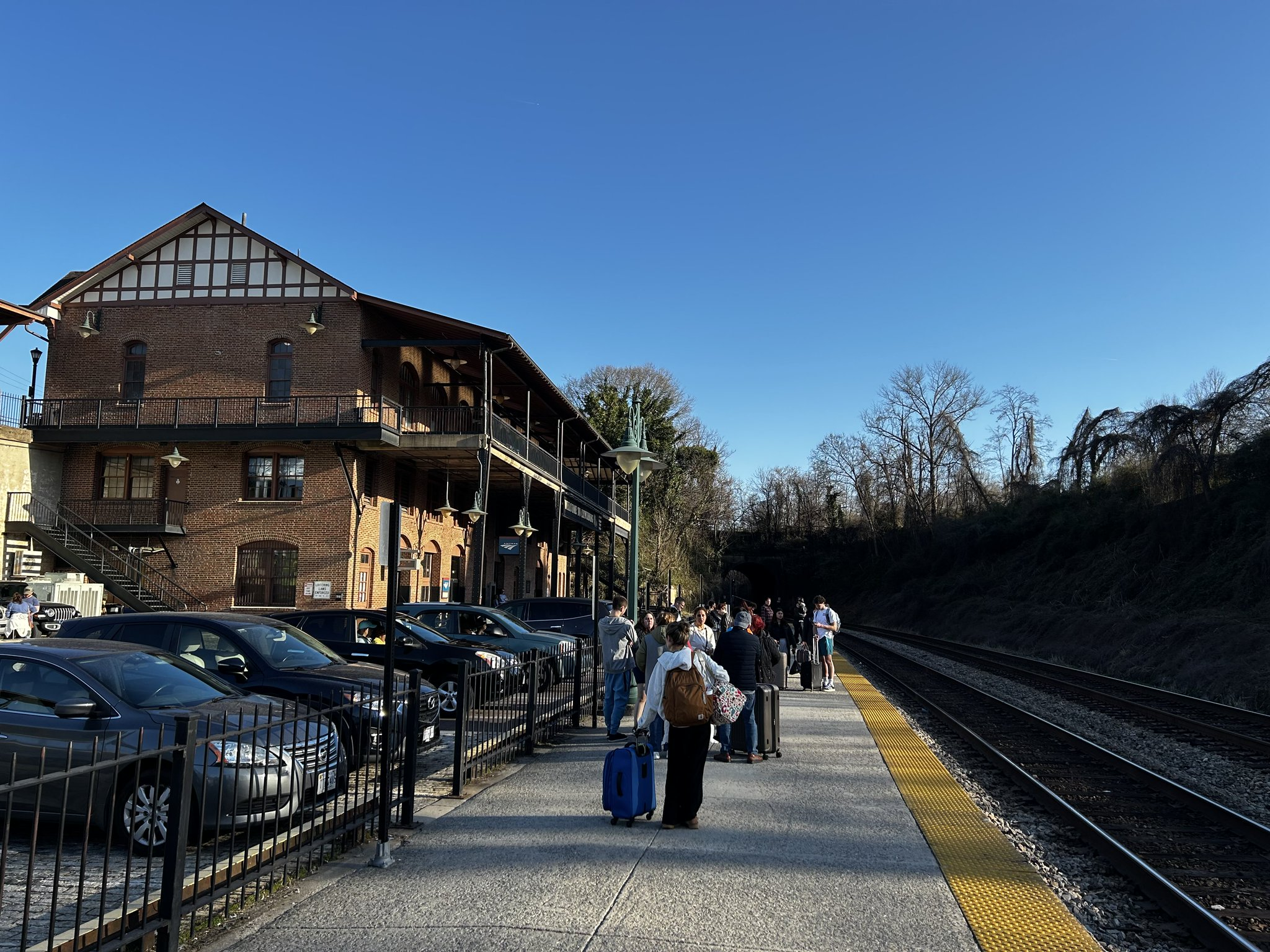
Greyhound and Amtrak operate from Kemper Street Station

==== Intercity ====
Intercity passenger rail and bus services are based out of Kemper Street Station, a historic, three-story train station recently restored and converted by the city of Lynchburg to serve as an intermodal hub for the community. The station is located at 825 Kemper Street.

===== Bus =====
Greyhound Lines located their bus terminal in the main floor of Kemper Street Station following its 2002 restoration. Greyhound offers transport to other cities throughout Virginia, the U.S., Canada, and Mexico.

===== Rail =====
Amtrak's long distance Crescent and a Northeast Regional connect Lynchburg with Boston, New York, Philadelphia, Baltimore, Washington, Charlotte, Atlanta, Birmingham, New Orleans and intermediate points.

In October 2009, Lynchburg became the southern terminus for a Northeast Regional that previously had overnighted in Washington. The forecast ridership was 51,000 for the 180-mile extension's first year, but the actual count was triple that estimate, and the train paid for itself without any subsidy. By FY 2015, the Regional had 190,000 riders. The Lynchburg station alone served a total of 85,000 riders in 2015. It is located in the track level ground floor of Kemper Street Station.

Lynchburg has two major freight railroads. It is the crossroads of two Norfolk Southern lines. One is the former mainline of the Southern Railway, upon which Kemper Street Station is situated. NS has a classification yard located next to the shopping mall. Various yard jobs can be seen. Railfans who wish to visit the NS Lynchburg yard are advised to inquire with an NS official. CSX Transportation also has a line through the city and a small yard.

===== Air =====
Lynchburg Regional Airport is solely served by American Eagle to Charlotte, North Carolina. American Eagle, a subsidiary of American Airlines, is the only current scheduled airline service provider, with seven daily arrivals and departures to Charlotte Douglas International Airport. In recent years air travel has increased, with 157,517 passengers flying in and out of the airport in 2012, representing 78% of the total aircraft load factor for that time period.

===== Highway =====
Primary roadways include U.S. Route 29, U.S. Route 29 Business, U.S. Route 501, U.S. Route 221, running north–south, and U.S. Highway 460 (Richmond Highway), running east–west. Portions of US 501 and US 29 Bus. form a freeway called the Lynchburg Expressway. While Lynchburg is the largest city in Virginia not served by an Interstate, parts of US 29 have been upgraded to Interstate standards and significant improvements have been made to US 460 in the immediate vicinity of Lynchburg and in suburban areas.

== Notable people ==
- Daniel Weisiger Adams (1820–1872), noted lawyer and Confederate Army officer
- Lynn Bari, (1913–1989), American actress
- Beth Behrs (born 1985), actress
- Ota Benga (c. 1883–1916), Congolese native who was exhibited in human zoos
- Alpha Blackburn (born 1939), interior and fashion designer, former TV show host
- James Albert Bonsack (1859–1924), invented in 1880 the first cigarette-rolling machine
- John A. Bridgland (1826–1890), diplomat, businessman, soldier; colonel in the Union Army
- Connie Britton (born 1967), actress
- Earl Brooks (1929–2010), racing driver
- Julie Story Byerley (born 1970), pediatrician and vice dean for education for the University of North Carolina at Chapel Hill School of Medicine
- George Cabell Sr. (1766–1823), physician
- Desmond Doss (1919–2006), Medal of Honor recipient for actions during World War II, dramatized in Hacksaw Ridge
- Arthur Earley (1926–1981), Pennsylvania state representative
- Jubal Early (1816–1894), lawyer and Confederate general
- Jerry Falwell (1933–2007), pastor and founder of Moral Majority
  - and his sons, Jerry Falwell Jr. (born 1962) and Jonathan Falwell (born 1966)
- Charles Browne Fleet (1843–1916), pharmacist and inventor of the micro-enema
- Carter Glass (1858–1946), U.S. Secretary of the Treasury under Woodrow Wilson
- Vinny Giles (born 1943), golfer, U.S. Amateur, British Amateur and Walker Cup champion
- Daniel Hudson (born 1987), MLB player for the Los Angeles Dodgers
- Brandon Inge (born 1977) MLB player, 2001–2013, 12 years for the Detroit Tigers, American League All Star 2009
- Rosa Kinckle Jones (1858–1932), African-American music teacher
- Luke Jordan (1892–1952), blues guitarist and vocalist
- Kevin Keatts, former head coach for NC State Wolfpack men's basketball and UNC Wilmington
- Sacha Killeya-Jones (born 1998), professional basketball player
- Harry Kraton (1883–1912), African-American juggler and tight rope walker; early advocate for black performers in vaudeville
- Randy Lanier (born 1954), professional race-car driver and convicted drug trafficker
- Leland D. Melvin (born 1964), engineer and NASA astronaut; named in 2010 as NASA's associate administrator for education
- Matt Mills (born 1996), NASCAR driver
- Rosalie Slaughter Morton (1876–1968), physician and surgeon
- Lucius Shepard (1943–2014), science fiction and fantasy writer
- William Smith (1797–1887), U.S. congressman, twice governor of Virginia, Confederate major general
- Anne Spencer (1882–1975), Harlem Renaissance poet and civil rights activist who revived and hosted the Lynchburg chapter of the NAACP from her home.
- Kara Stein (1964-), Commissioner of the Securities and Exchange Commission (2013–19), board member of the Public Company Accounting Oversight Board (2021-)
- Frank Trigg (c. 1850–1933), educator, college president
- Skeet Ulrich (born 1970), actor whose works include Scream, Riverdale and The Craft
- Phil Vassar (born 1964), country singer
- Bransford Vawter (1815–1838), Virginia's first poet
- Charles Vess (born 1951), fantasy and comics artist
- Walter Browne Woodson (1881–1948), rear admiral, Judge Advocate General of the Navy

== Sister cities ==
- Glauchau, Saxony, Germany
- Rueil-Malmaison, Île-de-France, France

== See also ==
- List of cities in Virginia
- National Register of Historic Places listings in Lynchburg, Virginia

== Bibliography ==
- Richard Edwards, ed. (1855), "Lynchburg", Statistical Gazetteer of the State of Virginia, Richmond
- Sketch Book of Lynchburg, Va., Lynchburg: Edward Pollock and S.C. Judson, 1887
- George E. Waring, Jr.; U.S. Department of the Interior, Census Office (1887), "Virginia: Lynchburg", Report on the Social Statistics of Cities: Southern and the Western States, Washington, DC: Government Printing Office, pp. 60–64
- Blackford, Charles M. Jr. (1891). Annals of the Lynchburg Home Guard. Lynchburg, Va.: Lynchburg Home Guard – via John W. Rohr, Electric Power Printer and Binder.
- "Lynchburg", Rand, McNally & Co.'s Handy Guide to the Southeastern States, Chicago: Rand, McNally & Co., 1899 – via Internet Archive
- W. Asbury Christian (1900), Lynchburg and its People, J. P. Bell Company, printers, OCLC 2847898
- Chisholm, Hugh, ed. (1911). "Lynchburg" . Encyclopædia Britannica. Vol. 17 (11th ed.). Cambridge University Press. p. 169.
- Federal Writers' Project (1941), "Lynchburg", Virginia: a Guide to the Old Dominion, American Guide Series, Oxford University Press, pp. 246+, ISBN 9780403021956 – via Google Books
- Ruth H. Blunt (1965). "Lynchburg's Tobacco Warehouses". Virginia Cavalcade. 14. Library of Virginia. ISSN 0042-6474.
- Schewel, Michael J. (1981). "Local Politics in Lynchburg, Virginia, in the 1880s Michael J. Schewel". Virginia Magazine of History and Biography. 89 (2): 170–180. JSTOR 4248478.
- Houck, Peter W. (1986). A Prototype of a Confederate Hospital Center in Lynchburg, Virginia. Lynchburg, Va.: Warwick House Pub. LCCN 86-50952. OCLC 15334361.
- Steven Elliot Tripp (1993). "Race, Class, and Religion: Lynchburg, Virginia's 'Great Revival of 1871'". Mid-America. 75. Loyola University Chicago. ISSN 0026-2927.
- John Nagy (1995). "Survival of Professional Baseball in Lynchburg, Virginia, 1950s-1990s". Essays in History. 37. University of Virginia. ISSN 0071-1411. Archived from the original on October 26, 2014.
- Cole, Jeffrey Scott. "The impact of the Great Depression and New Deal on the urban South: Lynchburg, Virginia as a case study, 1929-1941" (PhD dissertation, Bowling Green State University; ProQuest Dissertations & Theses, 1998. 9925908).
- Steven Elliot Tripp (1999). Yankee Town, Southern City: Race and Class Relations in Civil War Lynchburg. New York University Press. ISBN 978-0-8147-8237-8.
- Clifton Potter; Dorothy Potter (2004). Lynchburg: a City Set on Seven Hills. Charleston, SC: Arcadia. ISBN 978-0-7385-2461-0.
- James M. Elson. Lynchburg, Virginia: the First Two Hundred Years 1786–1986. Lynchburg: Warwick House Publishers, 2004.
- Paul T. Hellmann (2006). "Virginia: Lynchburg". Historical Gazetteer of the United States. Taylor & Francis. ISBN 1-135-94859-3.
- Dorothy Potter; Clifton Potter (2007). Lynchburg: 1757–2007. Images of America. Arcadia. ISBN 978-1-4396-3363-2.
