= South River Friends Meetinghouse =

Historic church in Virginia, United States

- U.S. National Register of Historic Places
- Virginia Landmarks Register
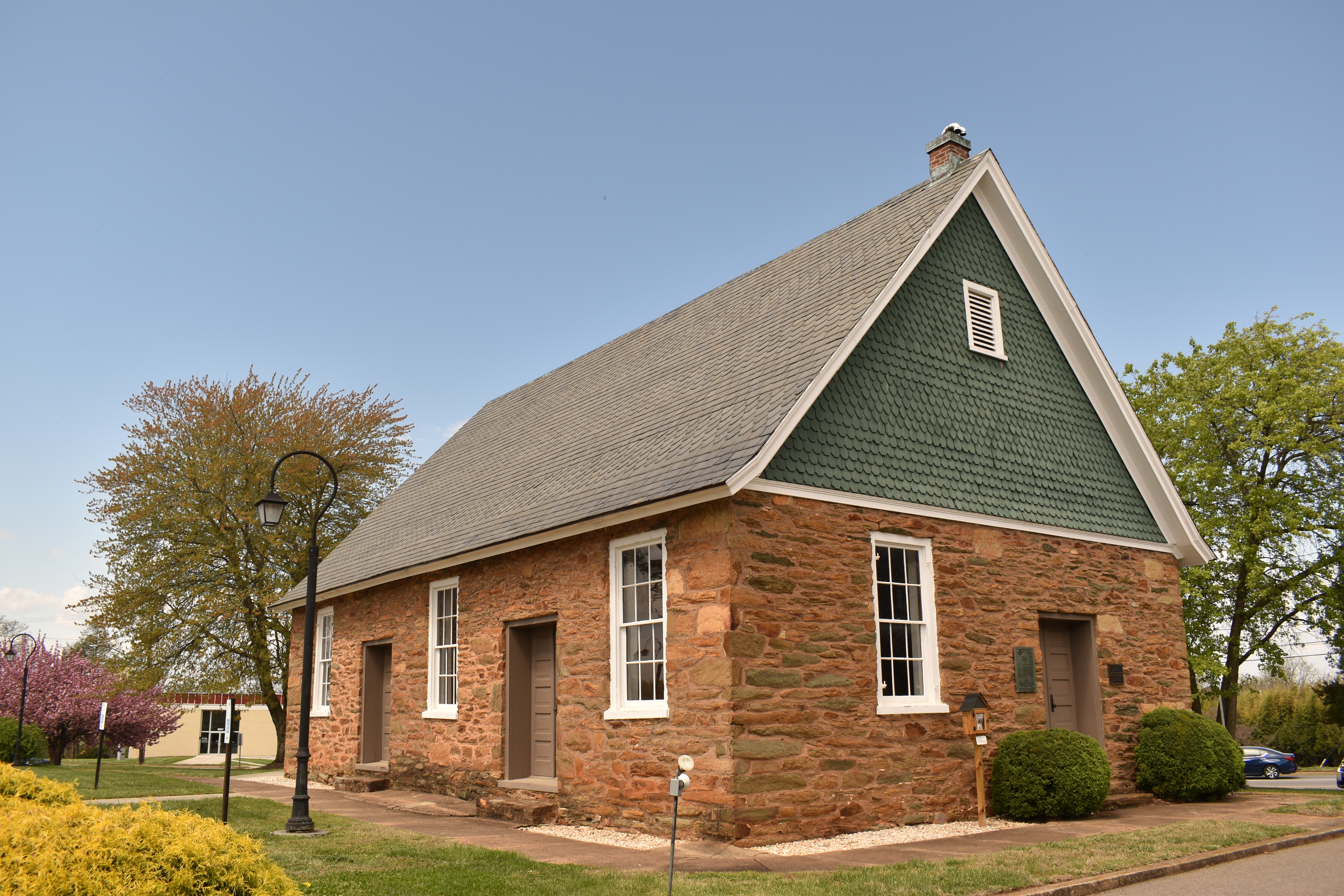
- South River Friends Meetinghouse, Lynchburg VA, April 2024

- Location within Virginia Location within the United States
- Location: 5810 Fort Ave., Lynchburg, Virginia
- Coordinates: 37°22′23″N 79°11′32″W
- Area: 7 acres (2.8 ha)
- Built: 1791
- NRHP reference No.: 75002113
- VLR No.: 118-0015

Significant dates
- Added to NRHP: August 28, 1975
- Designated VLR: May 20, 1975

The South River Friends Meetinghouse, or Quaker Meeting House, is a historic Friends meeting house located at Lynchburg, Virginia. It was completed in 1798. It is a rubble stone structure, approximately 30 by 51 feet (9.1 by 15.5 m), with walls 16 inches thick, and 12 feet high. The building was abandoned in the 1840s, with the Quakers of the region moving to Ohio due to economic hardship, and their moral opposition to slavery. The ruins of the building were utilized during the beginning of the Battle of Lynchburg, with Union troops camping near the ruins.

In 1899, Presbyterians purchased the ruins and 10 acres from the Society of Friends. They rebuilt the ruins for use as their church and held their first service in 1901, naming the new church Quaker Memorial Presbyterian Church in honor of its Quaker heritage. The building was restored to its historic appearance in 1990.

Adjacent to the structure is a historic burial ground. Buried there is John Lynch, the founder of the city whose final resting place is marked by a modern plaque.

It was listed on the National Register of Historic Places in 1975.
