= National Register of Historic Places listings in Lynchburg, Virginia =

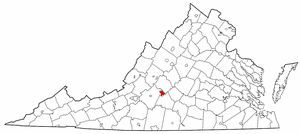
Location of Lynchburg in Virginia

This is a list of the National Register of Historic Places listings in Lynchburg, Virginia.

This is intended to be a complete list of the properties and districts on the National Register of Historic Places in the independent city of Lynchburg, Virginia, United States. The locations of National Register properties and districts for which the latitude and longitude coordinates are included below, may be seen in an online map.

There are 59 properties and districts listed on the National Register in the city, including 1 National Historic Landmark. Another property was once listed but has been removed.

This National Park Service list is complete through NPS recent listings posted October 2, 2026.

== Current listings ==
	Name on the Register	Image	Date listed	Location	Description
1	Academy of Music	Academy of Music	June 11, 1969 (#69000340)	522-526 Main St. 37°25′03″N 79°08′40″W	
2	Allied Arts Building	Allied Arts Building	December 19, 1985 (#85003203)	725 Church St. 37°24′55″N 79°08′39″W	
3	Armstrong Elementary School	Armstrong Elementary School	August 22, 2012 (#12000542)	1721 Monsview Pl. 37°25′46″N 79°09′36″W	
4	Aviary	Aviary	July 30, 1980 (#80004309)	402 Grove St. 37°24′09″N 79°09′45″W	
5	Bragassa Toy Store	Bragassa Toy Store	January 11, 1991 (#90002136)	323-325 12th St. 37°24′41″N 79°08′31″W	
6	Carnegie Hall	Carnegie Hall	August 17, 2020 (#100005441)	1501 Lakeside Dr. 37°24′03″N 79°10′59″W	
7	Centerview	Centerview	December 1, 2000 (#00001435)	1900 Memorial Ave. 37°24′31″N 79°09′42″W	
8	Court House Hill-Downtown Historic District	Court House Hill-Downtown Historic District	August 16, 2001 (#01000853)	Church, Clay, Court, and Main Sts., and roughly bounded by 5th through 13th Sts.; also roughly along Madison St., Harrison St., 7th St., 6th St.; also the 300 and 400 blocks of 12th, the 1200 block of Church, the 1000 block of Main, 1001 Commerce St., and 1300 Court Sts.; also 812 Maple Street; 37°24′51″N 79°08′37″W	Additional addresses represent boundary increases approved November 22, 2002, May 16, 2016, and March 9, 2026.
9	Court Street Baptist Church	Court Street Baptist Church	July 8, 1982 (#82004569)	6th and Court Sts. 37°24′58″N 79°08′48″W	
10	Daniel's Hill Historic District	Daniel's Hill Historic District	February 24, 1983 (#83003289)	Cabell, Norwood, Hancock, and Stonewall from 6th to H St. 37°25′30″N 79°08′53″W	
11	DeWitt-Wharton Manufacturing Company		February 18, 2021 (#100006156)	1701 12th St. 37°24′17″N 79°09′14″W	
12	Diamond Hill Baptist Church	Diamond Hill Baptist Church	February 22, 2011 (#11000026)	1415 Grace St. 37°24′27″N 79°08′38″W	
13	Diamond Hill Historic District	Diamond Hill Historic District	October 1, 1979 (#79003283)	Roughly bounded by Dunbar Dr. and Main, Jackson, and Arch Sts.; also Grace St. 37°24′32″N 79°08′29″W	Grace St. represents a boundary increase of April 14, 1983
14	Doyle Florist Inc.-H.R. Schenkel Inc. Greenhouse Range	Doyle Florist Inc.-H.R. Schenkel Inc. Greenhouse Range	November 19, 2014 (#14000946)	1339 Englewood St. 37°23′28″N 79°10′02″W	
15	Federal Hill Historic District	Federal Hill Historic District	September 17, 1980 (#80004310)	Roughly bounded by 8th, 12th, Harrison, and Polk Sts. 37°24′39″N 79°08′51″W	
16	Fifth Street Historic District	Fifth Street Historic District	February 8, 2012 (#12000019)	5th, 6th, Court, Clay, Madison, Harrison, Federal, Jackson, Polk, and Monroe Sts. 37°24′56″N 79°09′00″W	
17	First Baptist Church	First Baptist Church	September 9, 1982 (#82004570)	1100 Court St. 37°24′43″N 79°08′32″W	
18	Fort Early and Jubal Early Monument	Fort Early and Jubal Early Monument	January 24, 2002 (#01001517)	3511 Memorial Ave. 37°23′23″N 79°10′24″W	
19	Garland Hill Historic District	Garland Hill Historic District	September 7, 1972 (#72001507)	Bounded roughly by 5th St., Federal Ave., and the Norfolk Southern railroad tracks 37°25′03″N 79°09′03″W	
20	Carter Glass House	Carter Glass House	December 8, 1976 (#76002183)	605 Clay St. 37°24′56″N 79°08′50″W	
21	Hopwood Hall	Hopwood Hall	August 28, 2017 (#100001513)	1501 Lakeside Dr. 37°23′53″N 79°10′57″W	Academic building at Lynchburg College
22	Hunton Branch YMCA		June 3, 2025 (#100011894)	1120 12th Street; 37°24′27″N 79°08′56″W	
23	Dr. Robert Walter Johnson House and Tennis Court	Dr. Robert Walter Johnson House and Tennis Court	January 24, 2002 (#01001519)	1422 Pierce St. 37°24′11″N 79°09′02″W	
24	Jones Memorial Library	Jones Memorial Library	October 30, 1980 (#80004311)	434 Rivermont Ave. 37°25′20″N 79°08′59″W	
25	Kemper Street Industrial Historic District	Kemper Street Industrial Historic District	November 14, 2008 (#08001054)	1300-1500 (odd) Kemper St., 1200-1300 (even) Campbell Ave. 37°24′06″N 79°09′20″W	
26	Kentucky Hotel	Kentucky Hotel	December 11, 1986 (#86003468)	900 5th St. 37°24′52″N 79°09′06″W	
27	Locust Grove	Locust Grove	December 17, 1992 (#92001704)	Marvin Pl. 37°26′27″N 79°14′58″W	
28	Lower Basin Historic District	Lower Basin Historic District	April 24, 1987 (#87000601)	700-1300 blocks of Jefferson St., 600-1300 blocks of Commerce St., and 1200-1300 blocks of Main St.; also 1307 Main St. and 103-109 6th St.; also generally bounded by Concord Tpk., CSX RR tracks, East Lynch, Main, and Washington Sts. 37°24′52″N 79°08′21″W	Additional sets of boundaries represent boundary increases of June 6, 2002 and July 18, 2023
29	Lynch's Brickyard House	Lynch's Brickyard House	March 13, 2002 (#02000180)	700 Jackson St. 37°24′46″N 79°08′59″W	
30	Lynchburg Courthouse	Lynchburg Courthouse	May 19, 1972 (#72001508)	9th St. between Court and Church Sts. 37°24′49″N 79°08′40″W	
31	Lynchburg Hosiery Mill No. 1	Lynchburg Hosiery Mill No. 1	February 21, 2017 (#100000677)	2734 Fort Ave. 37°23′54″N 79°09′46″W	
32	Lynchburg Hospital	Lynchburg Hospital	December 9, 1999 (#99001506)	701-709 Hollins Mill Rd. 37°25′13″N 79°09′18″W	
33	Lynchburg Sta-Kleen Bakery		November 7, 2024 (#100010994)	1218 Park Avenue; 37°24′39″N 79°09′13″W	
34	Main Hall, Randolph-Macon Women's College	Main Hall, Randolph-Macon Women's College	June 19, 1979 (#79003285)	2500 Rivermont Ave. 37°26′14″N 79°10′19″W	
35	Samuel Miller House	Samuel Miller House	November 12, 1992 (#92001579)	1433 Nelson Dr. 37°21′58″N 79°12′47″W	
36	Miller-Claytor House	Miller-Claytor House	May 6, 1976 (#76002223)	Treasure Island Rd. at Miller-Claytor Lane; 37°26′13″N 79°09′48″W	
37	Montview	Montview	June 5, 1987 (#87000854)	Liberty University campus between Candlers Mountain Rd. and U.S. Route 29; 37°21′11″N 79°10′42″W	
38	Old City Cemetery	Old City Cemetery	April 2, 1973 (#73002216)	4th, Monroe, and 1st Sts., and the Norfolk Southern railroad tracks 37°24′54″N 79°09′24″W	
39	William Phaup House	William Phaup House	March 13, 2002 (#02000182)	911 6th St. 37°24′48″N 79°09′05″W	
40	Pierce Street Historic District	Pierce Street Historic District	August 25, 2014 (#14000527)	1300-1400 blocks of Pierce and the 1300 blocks of Fillmore and Buchanan Sts. 37°24′14″N 79°09′06″W	
41	Point of Honor	Point of Honor	February 26, 1970 (#70000872)	112 Cabell St. 37°25′14″N 79°08′38″W	
42	Presbyterian Cemetery		October 5, 2026 (#100013481)	2020 Grace Street; 37°24′08″N 79°08′19″W	
43	Presbyterian Orphans Home	Presbyterian Orphans Home	June 24, 2010 (#08000073)	150 Linden Ave. 37°26′57″N 79°11′49″W	
44	Pyramid Motors	Pyramid Motors	November 1, 2007 (#07001140)	405-407 Federal St. 37°24′56″N 79°09′05″W	
45	Randolph-Macon Woman's College Historic District		July 23, 2026 (#100013221)	2500 Rivermont Avenue, 155 & 139 Norfolk Avenue, 5 Quinlan Street; 37°26′19″N 79°10′10″W	
46	Rivermont	Rivermont	May 11, 2000 (#00000496)	205 F St. 37°25′29″N 79°08′50″W	
47	Rivermont Historic District	Rivermont Historic District	April 11, 2003 (#03000224)	Rivermont Ave. and 200 Boston Ave. 37°26′04″N 79°09′38″W	200 Boston Avenue represents a boundary increase of May 28, 2013
48	Rosedale	Rosedale	July 7, 1983 (#83003291)	Old Graves Mill Rd.; also Graves Mill Rd. west of the junction with U.S. Route 501; 37°22′33″N 79°13′45″W	Second location represents a boundary increase of April 10, 1992
49	St. Paul's Church	St. Paul's Church	September 9, 1982 (#82004572)	605 Clay St. 37°24′54″N 79°08′49″W	
50	Saint Paul's Vestry House	Saint Paul's Vestry House	February 21, 1997 (#97000157)	308 7th St. 37°24′56″N 79°08′42″W	
51	Sandusky House	Sandusky House	July 26, 1982 (#82004571)	757 Sandusky Dr. 37°22′49″N 79°11′47″W	
52	South River Friends Meetinghouse	South River Friends Meetinghouse	August 28, 1975 (#75002113)	5810 Fort Ave. 37°22′24″N 79°11′31″W	
53	Anne Spencer House	Anne Spencer House	December 6, 1976 (#76002224)	1313 Pierce St. 37°24′14″N 79°09′07″W	
54	Twelfth Street Industrial Historic District	Twelfth Street Industrial Historic District	May 31, 2018 (#100002529)	600 and 700 blocks of 12th St., 603 Grace St., and Dunbar Dr. 37°24′35″N 79°08′41″W	
55	Virginia Episcopal School	Virginia Episcopal School	October 28, 1992 (#92001392)	400 Virginia Episcopal School Rd. 37°27′12″N 79°11′27″W	
56	Virginia University of Lynchburg	Virginia University of Lynchburg	February 22, 2011 (#11000035)	2058 Garfield Ave. 37°23′43″N 79°09′06″W	
57	John Marshall Warwick House	John Marshall Warwick House	December 6, 1996 (#96001449)	720 Court St. 37°24′53″N 79°08′41″W	
58	Western Hotel	Western Hotel	July 22, 1974 (#74002236)	5th and Madison Sts. 37°24′57″N 79°08′56″W	
59	J. W. Wood Building	J. W. Wood Building	February 17, 1983 (#83003292)	23-27 9th St. 37°24′58″N 79°08′26″W	

== Former listing ==
	Name on the Register	Image	Date listed	Date removed	Location	City or town	Description
1	Hayes Hall		October 26, 1979 (#79003284)	March 19, 2001	Dewitt St. and Garfield Ave. 37°23′42″N 79°09′07″W	Lynchburg	Demolished April 1988

== See also ==
- List of National Historic Landmarks in Virginia
- National Register of Historic Places listings in Virginia
- National Register of Historic Places listings in Amherst County, Virginia
- National Register of Historic Places listings in Bedford County, Virginia
- National Register of Historic Places listings in Campbell County, Virginia
