= Virginia State Route 163 =

State highway in central Virginia, US

State Route 163

Route information
- Maintained by VDOT
- Length: 6.74 mi (10.85 km)
- Existed: c. 2005–present

Major junctions
- South end: US 501 / US 29 Bus. in Lynchburg
- SR 128 in Lynchburg; US 221 in Lynchburg; SR 210 in Madison Heights
- North end: US 29 Bus. / SR 1040 in Madison Heights

Location
- Country: United States
- State: Virginia
- Counties: City of Lynchburg, Amherst

Highway system
- Virginia Routes; Interstate; US; Primary; Secondary; Byways; History; HOT lanes
← SR 162	→ SR 164

State Route 163 (SR 163) is a primary state highway in the U.S. state of Virginia. The state highway runs 6.74 miles (10.85 km) from U.S. Route 501 (US 501) and US 29 Business in Lynchburg north to US 29 Business in Madison Heights. SR 163 is the original alignment of US 29 through Lynchburg, a highway has been twice bypassed: first by the Lynchburg Expressway and later by US 29's present bypass. The state highway provides access to downtown Lynchburg and many other historic neighborhoods of the independent city.

== Route description ==
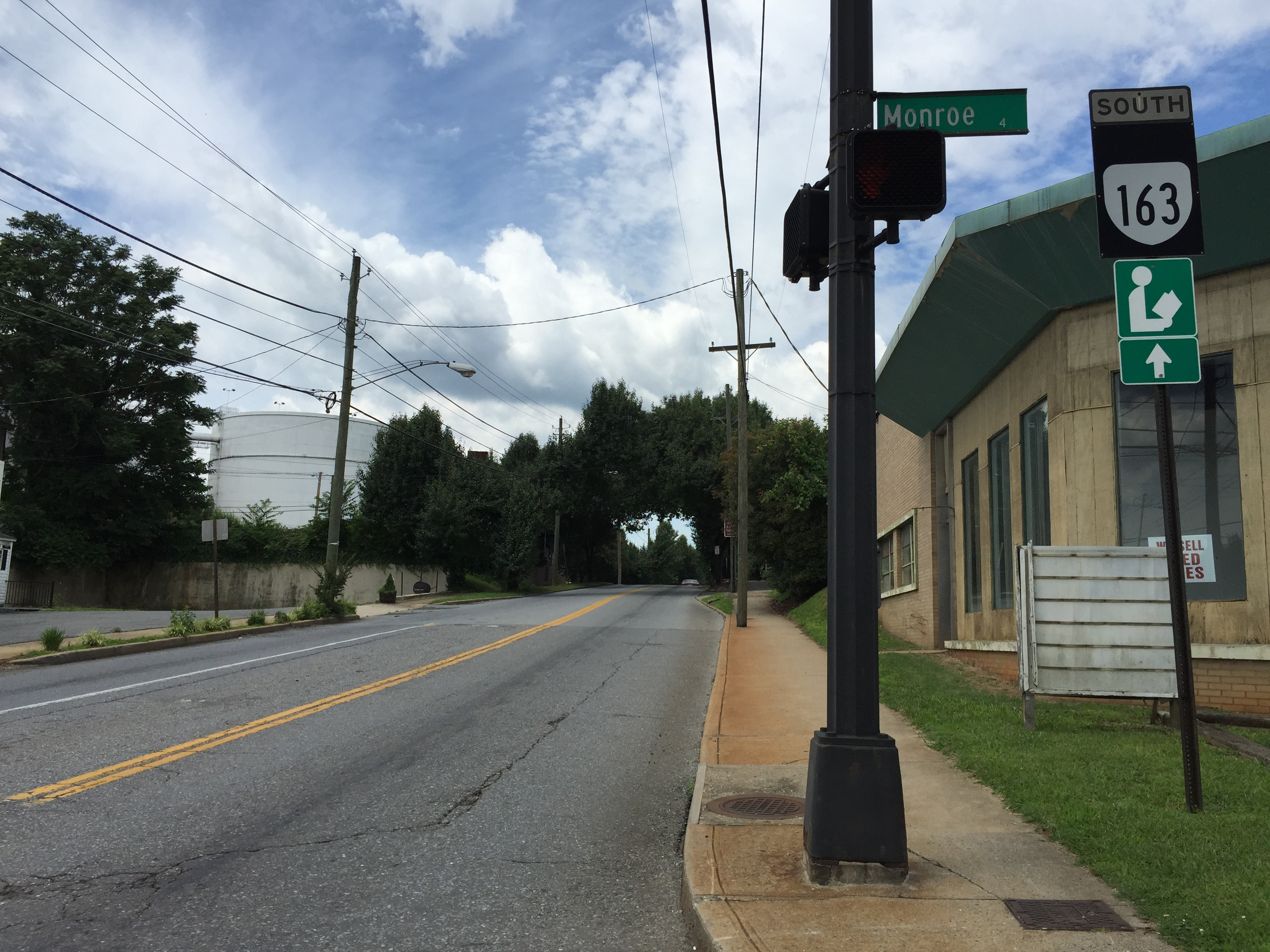
View south along SR 163 at Monroe Street in Lynchburg

SR 163 begins as Wards Road, a five-lane road with a center left-turn lane, at a partial interchange with US 501 (Lynchburg Expressway) and US 29 Business (Wards Road) adjacent to the River Ridge Mall on the south side of Lynchburg. Wards Road continues south as US 29 Business toward a junction with US 29 and US 460. There is no direct access from southbound SR 163 to northbound US 29 and southbound US 501, or from southbound US 29 and northbound US 501 to northbound SR 163. The missing movements are made via SR 163's intersection with SR 128 (Candler Mountain Road), which has a full interchange with US 501 and US 29 Business (Lynchburg Expressway) to the east. SR 163 continues north as Wards Road across Norfolk Southern Railway's Blue Ridge District to US 460 Business (Fort Avenue). The two highways run concurrently northeast as a four-lane undivided highway to the Fort Early and Jubal Early Monument, where SR 163 diverges north as two-lane Memorial Avenue at an acute intersection. Access from southbound SR 163 to eastbound US 460 Business and from westbound US 460 Business to northbound SR 163 is provided through Oakridge Boulevard.

SR 163 continues north toward downtown Lynchburg. The state highway intersects US 221 (Oakley Avenue) and US 501 Business (Langhorne Road) and passes the historic home Centerview before crossing Norfolk Southern's Danville District rail line and becoming 5th Street. SR 163 passes the Old City Cemetery, Pyramid Motors, and the Kentucky Hotel on its way to a roundabout with Federal Street. Federal Street leads northwest into the Garland Hill Historic District, which contains the historic Lynchburg Hospital; and southeast into the Federal Hill Historic District, which preserves the William Phaup House, Lynch's Brickyard House, and the Dr. Robert Walter Johnson House and Tennis Court. SR 163 continues northeast along the northern edge of downtown Lynchburg, passing by the Western Hotel and near many more historic buildings and cultural sites in the Court House Hill-Downtown and Lower Basin historic districts in downtown Lynchburg.

At the northern corner of downtown Lynchburg, SR 163 intersects the one-way pair of Church Street and Main Street, which combine to head northwest as Rivermont Avenue toward the Daniel's Hill and Rivermont historic districts. The state highway exits the city as Amherst Highway on a four-lane bridge over the James River and CSX's James River Subdivision into Amherst County. After reducing to two lanes and ascending out of the river valley, SR 163 meets the western end of SR 210 (Colony Road), which connects the highway with US 29 Business and US 29. The state highway continues north through a partial diamond interchange with US 29 Business (Lynchburg Expressway) that allows access from SR 163 to southbound US 29 Business, from northbound US 29 Business to SR 163, and from southbound US 29 Business to southbound SR 163. SR 163 gains a second lane northbound for its final stretch to its northern terminus at an intersection with US 29 Business that serves as the northern end of the Lynchburg Expressway. US 29 Business continues north as Amherst Highway through Madison Heights before reaching US 29 just south of Amherst.

== Major intersections ==
County	Location	mi	km	Destinations	Notes
City of Lynchburg		0.00	0.00	US 501 north / US 29 Bus. south (Wards Road)	Partial interchange; southern terminus
City of Lynchburg		0.44	0.71	SR 128 east (Candlers Mountain Road) to US 29 Bus. north	
City of Lynchburg		0.86	1.38	US 460 Bus. west (Fort Avenue)	South end of concurrency with US 460 Business
City of Lynchburg		2.05	3.30	US 460 Bus. east (Fort Avenue)	North end of concurrency with US 460 Business; no left turn southbound
City of Lynchburg		2.65	4.26	US 221 (Oakley Avenue)	
City of Lynchburg		3.45	5.55	US 501 Bus. (Langhorne Road)	
James River				John Lynch Memorial Bridge	
Amherst	Madison Heights			SR 210 east (Old Town Connector) to US 29 – Central Virginia Training Center	
Amherst	Madison Heights			US 29 Bus. south	Partial interchange
Amherst	Madison Heights	6.74	10.85	US 29 Bus. (Lynchburg Expressway / South Amherst Highway) / SR 1040 (Lyttleton Lane)	Northern terminus
1.000 mi = 1.609 km; 1.000 km = 0.621 mi: Concurrency terminus; Incomplete access
