= Virginia State Route 209 (disambiguation) =

State Route 209

Route information
- Maintained by VDOT

Location
- Country: United States
- State: Virginia

Highway system
- Virginia Routes; Interstate; US; Primary; Secondary; Byways; History; HOT lanes
← SR 208	→ SR 210

Virginia State Route 209 may refer to

- State Route 209 (Virginia 1928-1933)
- State Route 209 (Virginia 1933-1948)
- State Route 209 (Virginia 1957)
- Virginia State Route 209, the present-day State Route 209 along Innovation Avenue in Loudoun County near Herndon.
