= Lynchburg Hosiery Mill No. 1 =

- U.S. National Register of Historic Places
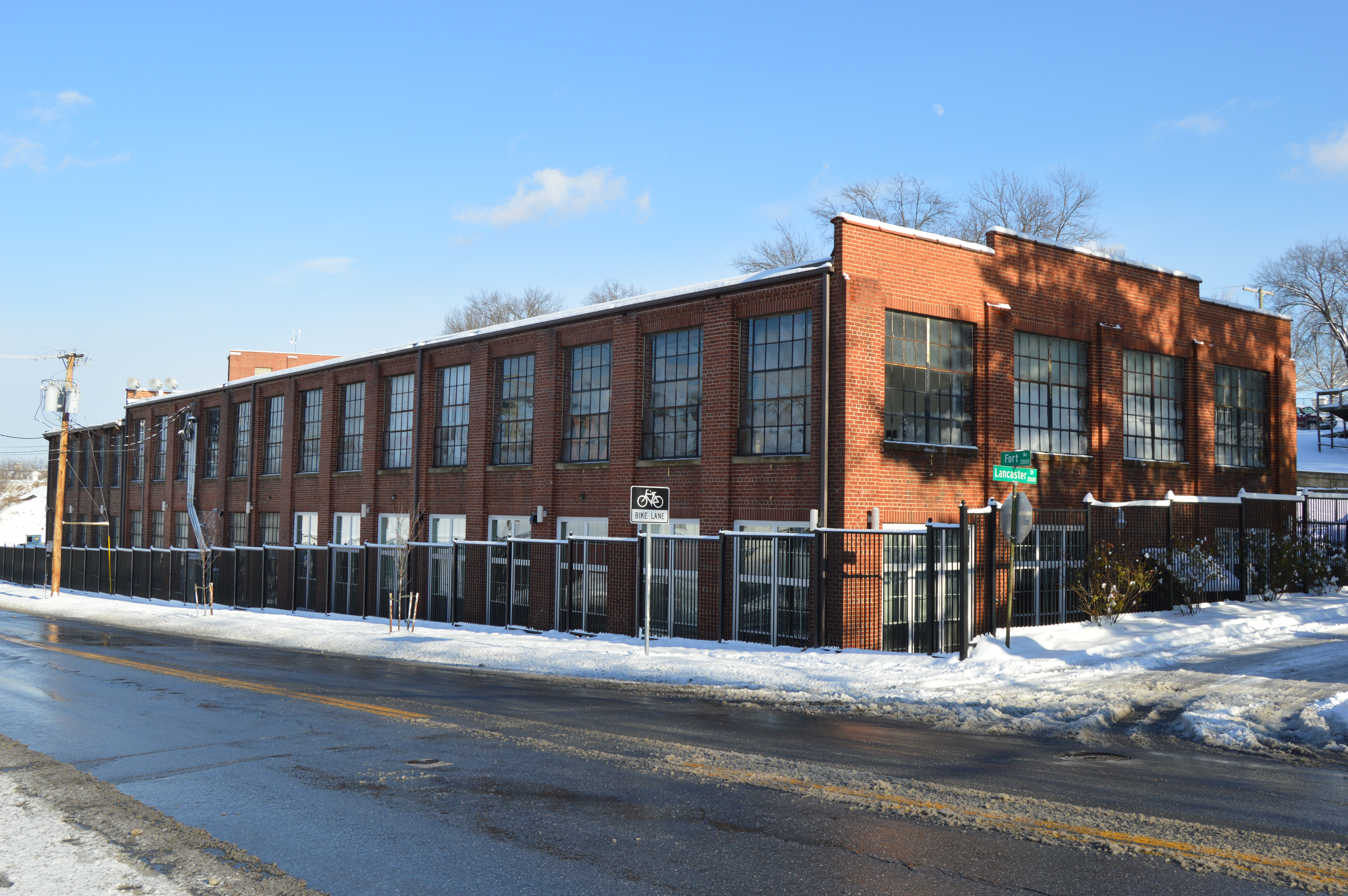

- Location within Virginia Location within the United States
- Location: 2734 Fort Ave., Lynchburg, Virginia
- Coordinates: 37°23′54″N 79°9′46″W
- Area: 4 acres (1.6 ha)
- Built: 1900
- Architectural style: Commercial
- NRHP reference No.: 100000677
- Added to NRHP: February 21, 2017

The Lynchburg Hosiery Mill No. 1 is a historic industrial property at 2734 Fort Avenue in Lynchburg, Virginia. The 4-acre (1.6 ha) property includes two early 20th-century brick buildings whose construction history dates to 1900, although the oldest surviving portions now date to the 1920s. It was one of the first hosiery factories established in the American South, producing socks for the United States Army during World War I. The mill was closed in 1972 and partially destroyed by fire in 1980.

The mill was listed on the National Register of Historic Places in 2017.

== See also ==
- National Register of Historic Places listings in Lynchburg, Virginia
