= Twelfth Street Industrial Historic District =

Historic district in Virginia, United States

- U.S. National Register of Historic Places
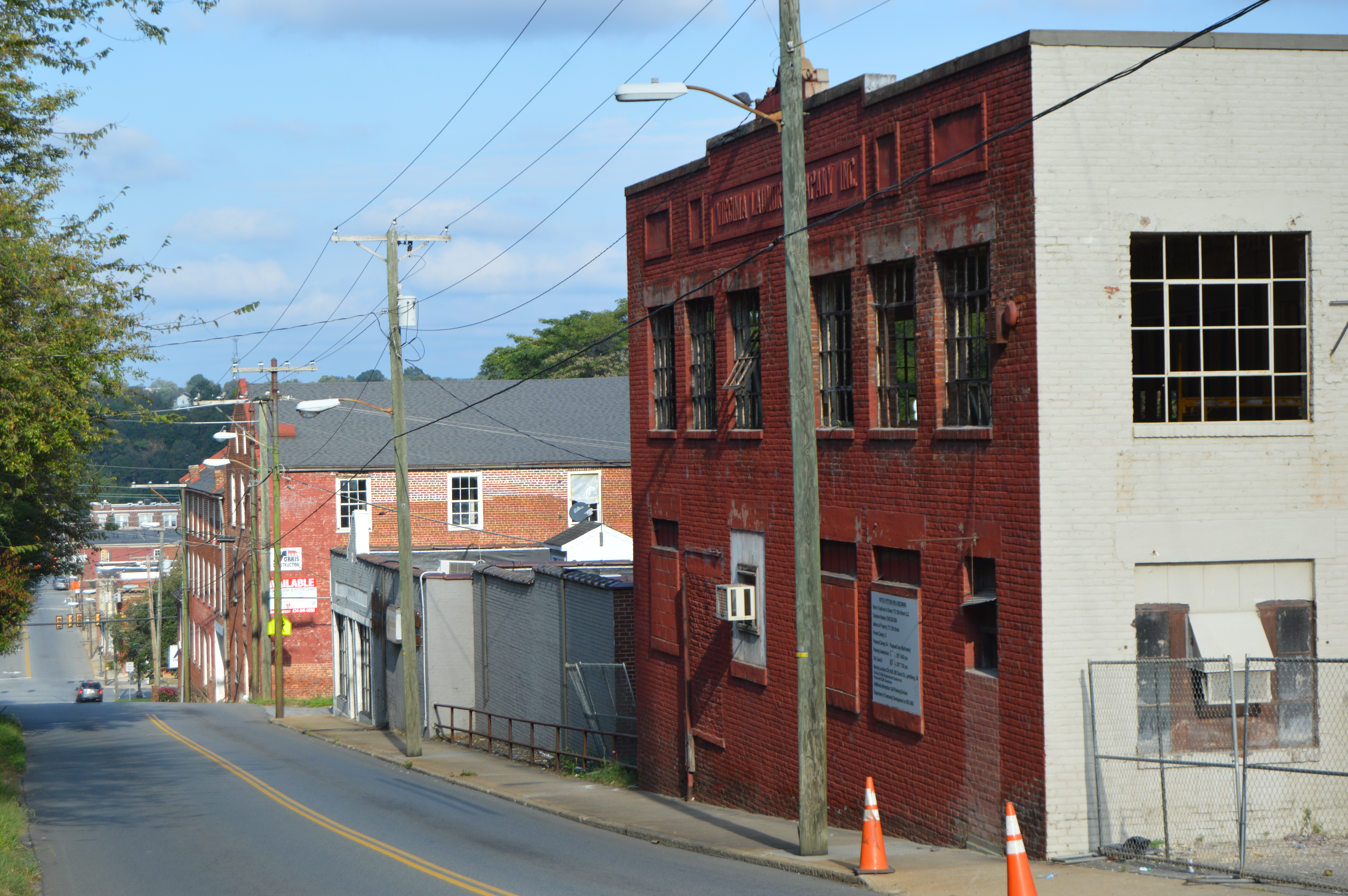
- Twelfth looking east from Federal

- Location within Virginia
- Location: 600 and 700 blocks of 12th St., and 603 Grace St. and Dunbar Dr., Lynchburg, Virginia
- Coordinates: 37°24′35″N 79°08′41″W
- NRHP reference No.: 100002529
- Added to NRHP: May 31, 2018

The Twelfth Street Industrial Historic District in Lynchburg, Virginia is a historic district which was listed on the National Register of Historic Places in 2018.

The area contains industrial buildings including tobacco warehouses and a commercial laundry. The area was also home to a school for African Americans and a Lodge. In 2018, plans for the historic designation and redevelopment of one of the buildings as lofts were proposed. It is Lynchburg's 11th historic district.

== See also ==
- National Register of Historic Places listings in Lynchburg, Virginia
