= Kemper Street Industrial Historic District =

Historic district in Virginia, United States

- U.S. National Register of Historic Places
- U.S. Historic district
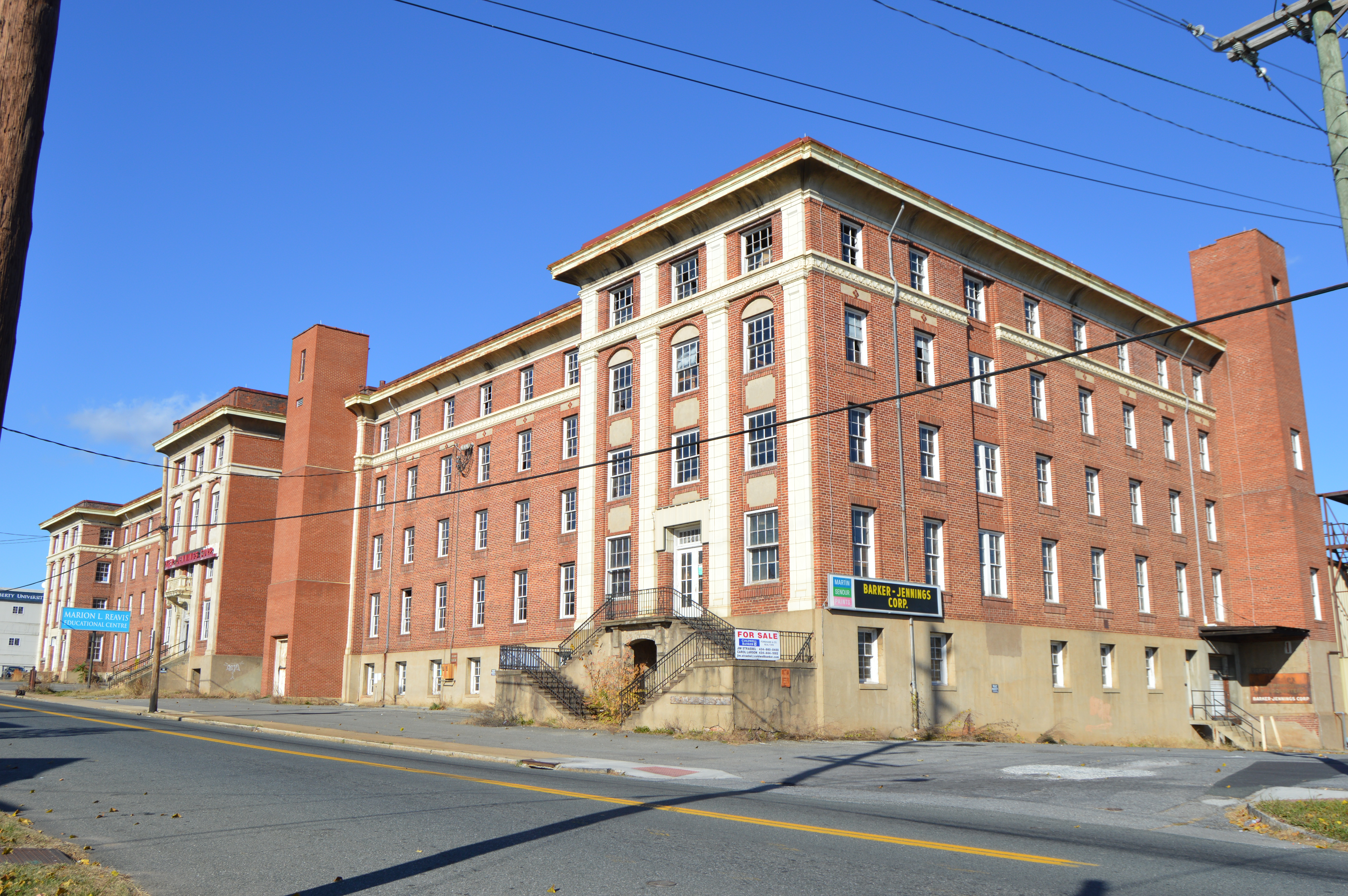
- A warehouse on Campbell Avenue

- Location within Virginia Location within the United States
- Location: 1300-1500 (odd) Kemper St., 1200-1300 (even) Campbell Ave., Lynchburg, Virginia
- Coordinates: 37°24′6″N 79°9′20″W
- Area: 16.88 acres (6.83 ha)
- Built: 1916
- Architectural style: Georgian Revival; Art Deco
- NRHP reference No.: 08001054
- Added to NRHP: November 14, 2008

The Kemper Street Industrial Historic District encompasses a collection of industrial sites on Campbell Avenue and Kemper Street in Lynchburg, Virginia. It includes factory and related buildings on the southwest side of Kemper Street between 13th and 15th Streets, and similar buildings on the northeast side of Campbell Avenue between 12th and 14th, as well as the right of way of the Norfolk and Southern Railway that separates these two areas. Development of this area began in the early 20th century, with some fine Georgian Revival buildings, and saw a second round of development in the 1930s and 1940s.

The district was listed on the National Register of Historic Places in 2008.

== See also ==
- National Register of Historic Places listings in Lynchburg, Virginia
