= Doyle Florist Inc.-H.R. Schenkel Inc. Greenhouse Range =

Historic commercial building in Virginia, United States

- U.S. National Register of Historic Places
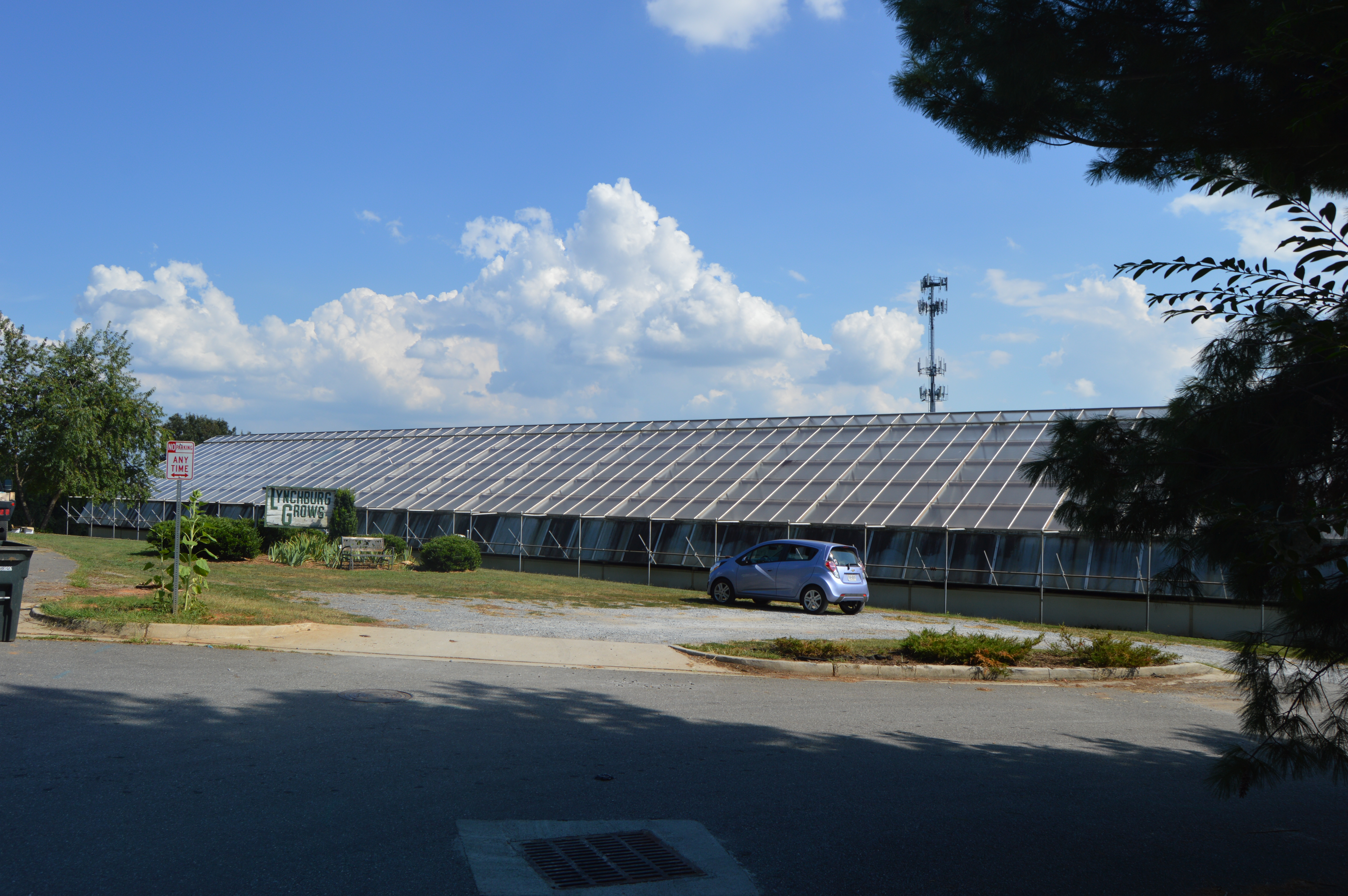
- Greenhouse on the northern side of the complex

- Location within Virginia Location within the United States
- Location: 1339 Englewood Street, Lynchburg, Virginia
- Coordinates: 37°23′27″N 79°10′2″W
- Area: 6.8 acres (2.8 ha)
- Built: 1920
- NRHP reference No.: 14000946
- Added to NRHP: November 19, 2014

The Doyle Florist Inc.-H.R. Schenkel Inc. Greenhouse Range is a historic commercial garden property at 1339 Englewood Street in Lynchburg, Virginia. Developed beginning in 1920, it is a complex of nine greenhouses, five of which were built in 1920, with the other four added in later years beginning c. 1955. The complex is representative of the rise and fall of the cut flower industry in the nation, which reached its height in the 1950s and has since declined due to strong international competition. The complex also includes a root cellar for plant storage, a packing shed, a farmhouse, and a small brick power plant, on about 7 acres (2.8 ha) of land. The facility was used for the production and distribution of cut flowers from 1920 to 1999.

The property was listed on the National Register of Historic Places in 2014.

== See also ==
- National Register of Historic Places listings in Lynchburg, Virginia
