= Hopwood Hall (Lynchburg, Virginia) =

- U.S. National Register of Historic Places
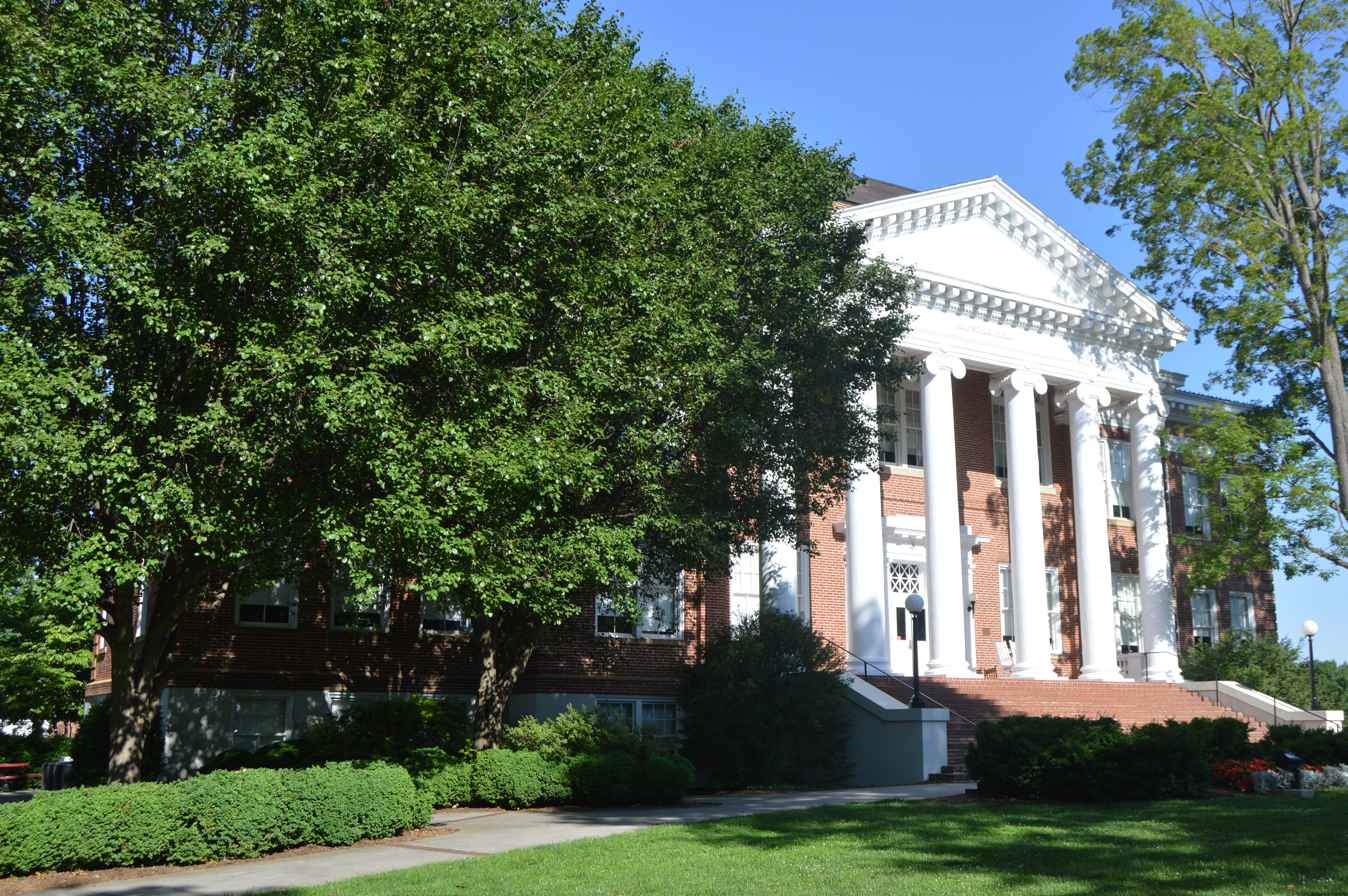
- Front of the building

- Location within Virginia Location within the United States
- Location: Campus of Lynchburg College, Lynchburg, Virginia
- Coordinates: 37°23′53″N 79°10′57″W
- Area: less than one acre
- Built: 1909
- Architect: Edward G. Frye
- Architectural style: Beaux Arts
- NRHP reference No.: 100001513
- Added to NRHP: August 28, 2017

Hopwood Hall is the central and oldest building on the campus Lynchburg College in Lynchburg, Virginia. It was built in 1909 to a design by Edward G. Frye, a Roanoke-based architect. It is a four-story building with Beaux Arts styling, and is one of the most architecturally sophisticated buildings in the city. It is named for Dr. Josephus Hopwood, one of the college's founders. The building has had many functions over the years, but has always housed classrooms; its library was restored to its original appearance in 2016.

The building was listed on the National Register of Historic Places in 2017.

== See also ==
- National Register of Historic Places listings in Lynchburg, Virginia
