= Presbyterian Orphans Home =

- U.S. National Register of Historic Places
- Virginia Landmarks Register
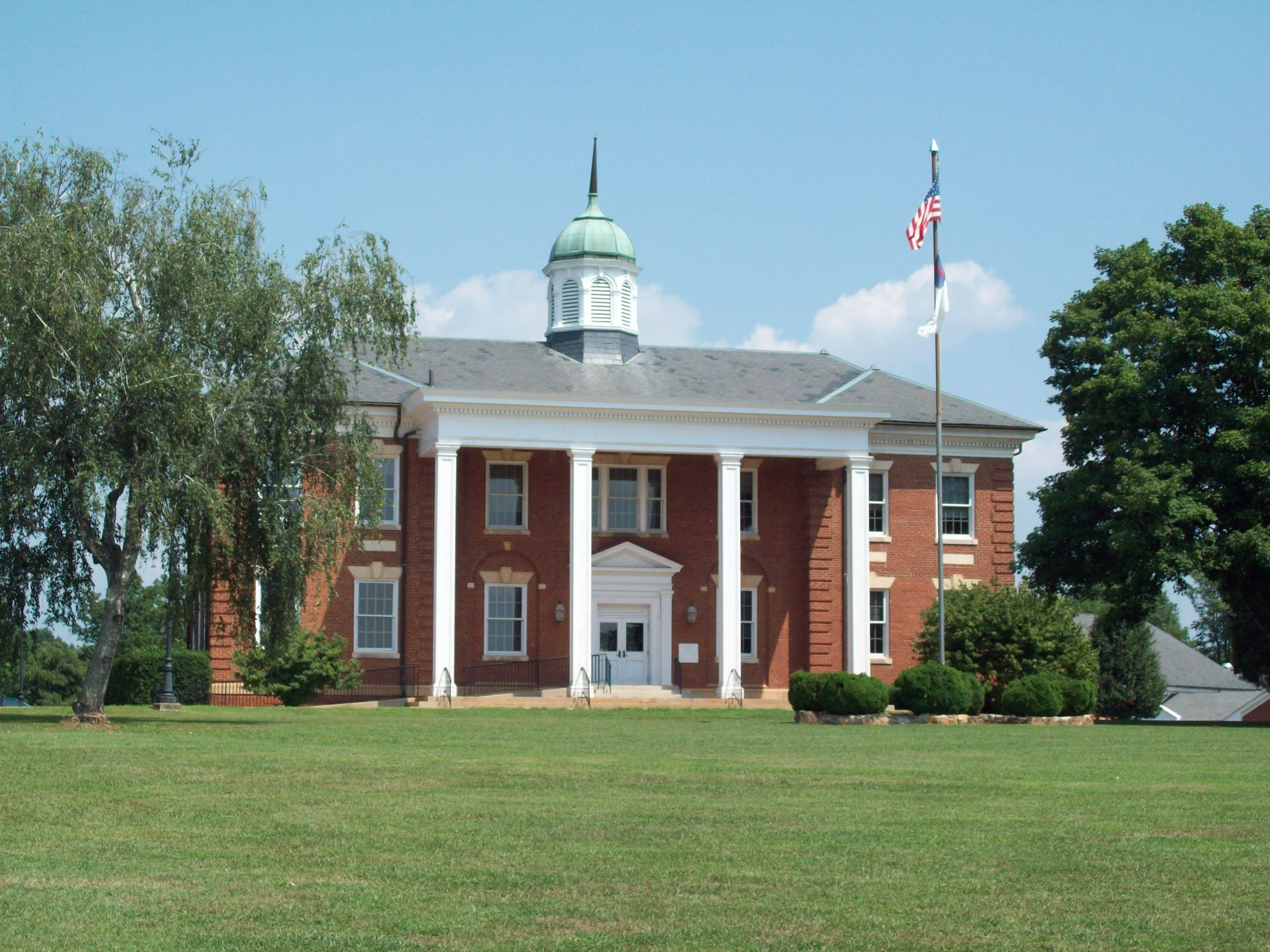
- Executive Building, August 2010

- Location within Virginia Location within the United States
- Location: 150 Linden Ave., Lynchburg, Virginia
- Coordinates: 37°26′50″N 79°11′42″W
- Area: 166 acres (67 ha)
- Built: 1911
- Architect: Lewis, John Minor Botts; et al.
- Architectural style: Colonial Revival, Greek Revival
- NRHP reference No.: 08000073
- VLR No.: 118-5240

Significant dates
- Added to NRHP: June 24, 2010
- Designated VLR: December 5, 2007

Presbyterian Orphans Home, now known as Presbyterian Homes & Family Services, is a historic "cottage style" orphanage complex located at Lynchburg, Virginia. It consists of six residence halls, a superintendent's house, and an executive building, all constructed of brick in the Georgian Revival style. Also on the property is a Greek Revival style gymnasium. Other contributing buildings and structures include the maintenance building, swimming pool, two farmhouses, dairy barn, stable, barn, and entry gates. A contributing site is the campus circle.

On 26 October 1909, five children housed in the nursery were killed in a fire. Shelton Cottage, a two-story building, was completely destroyed. Newspaper reports from the time call the institution the "Virginia Synod Presbyterian Orphans' Home."

The original buildings were constructed in 1911.

It was listed on the National Register of Historic Places in 2010.

== Gallery ==
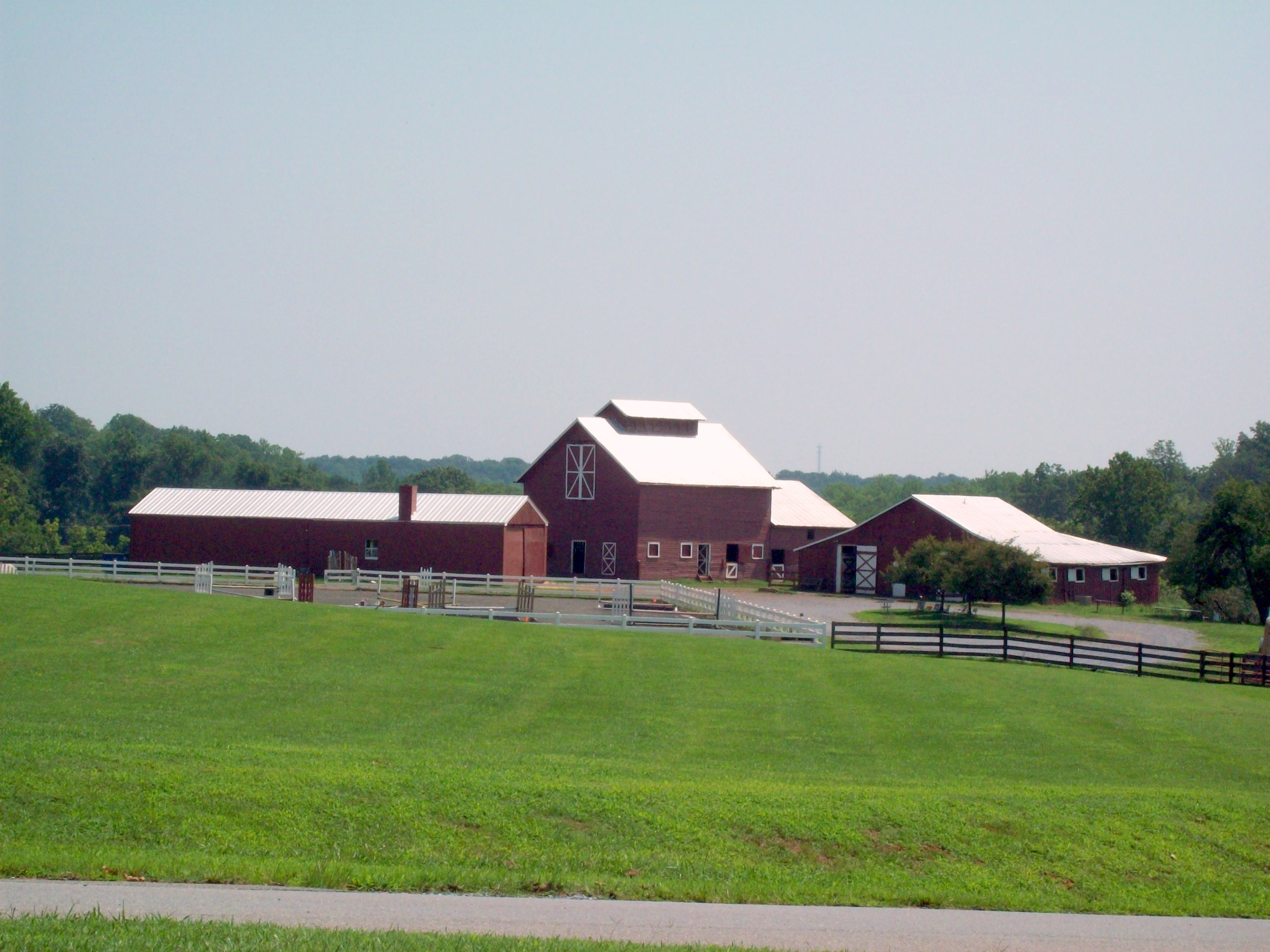
Barns, August 2010

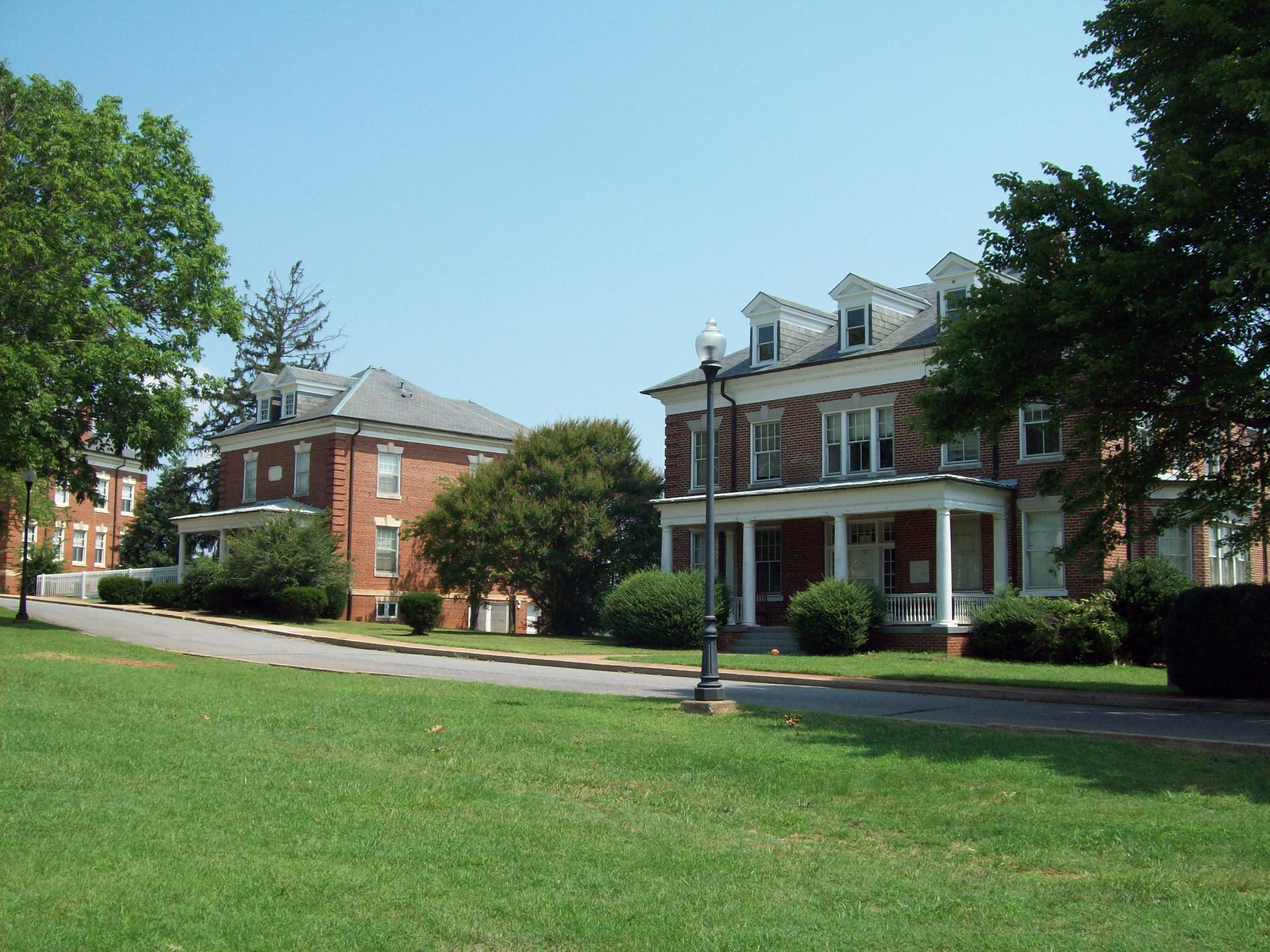
Residence Halls, August 2010

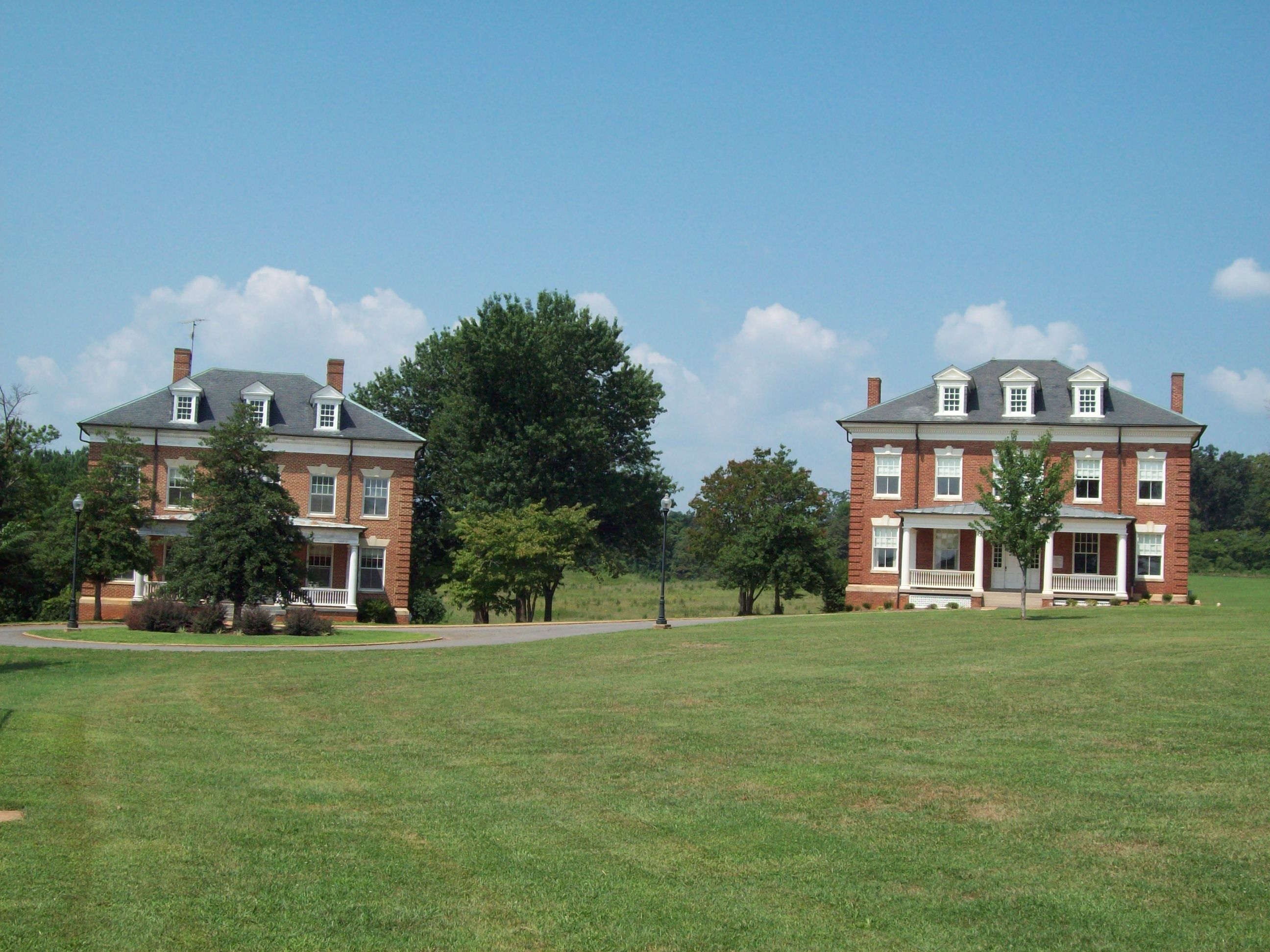
Residence Halls, August 2010
