= Saint Paul's Vestry House =

Historic building in Virginia, US

- U.S. National Register of Historic Places
- Virginia Landmarks Register
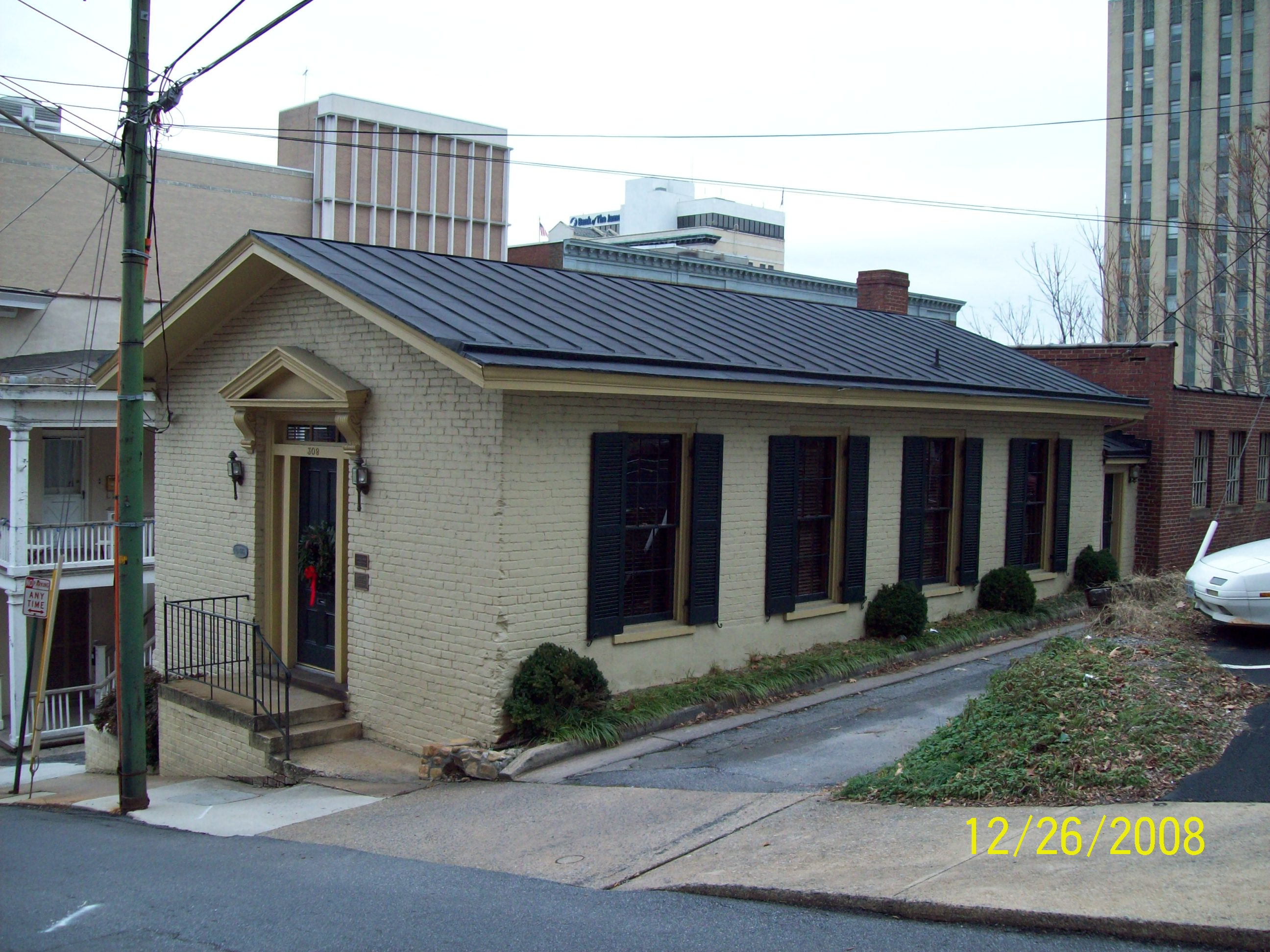
- St. Pauls Vestry House, December 2008

- Location within Virginia Location within the United States
- Location: 308 7th St., Lynchburg, Virginia
- Coordinates: 37°24′53″N 79°8′40″W
- Area: 0.1 acres (0.040 ha)
- Built: c. 1855
- Architectural style: Classical Revival
- NRHP reference No.: 97000157
- VLR No.: 118-0078

Significant dates
- Added to NRHP: February 21, 1997
- Designated VLR: December 4, 1996

The Saint Paul's Vestry House is a historic building in Lynchburg, Virginia, United States. It was built about 1855 and is a single-story Classical Revival-style building with a simple low pitched gable roof and a rectangular plan. It is likely the only vestry house built exclusively for the governing body of an Episcopal Church in Virginia. It also served as the first home of the Lynchburg Woman's Club from 1903 to 1916.

It was listed on the National Register of Historic Places in 1997.
