= Virginia State Route 210 =

State highway in Amherst County, Virginia, US

State Route 210
- Old Town Connector

Route information
- Maintained by VDOT
- Length: 3.14 mi (5.05 km)
- Existed: c. 2003–present

Major junctions
- West end: SR 163 in Madison Heights
- US 29 Bus. in Madison Heights
- East end: US 29 / SR 672 near Madison Heights

Location
- Country: United States
- State: Virginia
- Counties: Amherst

Highway system
- Virginia Routes; Interstate; US; Primary; Secondary; Byways; History; HOT lanes
← SR 209	→ US 211

State Route 210 (SR 210) is a primary state highway in the U.S. state of Virginia. Known as the Old Town Connector, the state highway runs 3.14 miles (5.05 km) from SR 163 in Madison Heights east to U.S. Route 29 (US 29) near Madison Heights in southeastern Amherst County.

== Route description ==
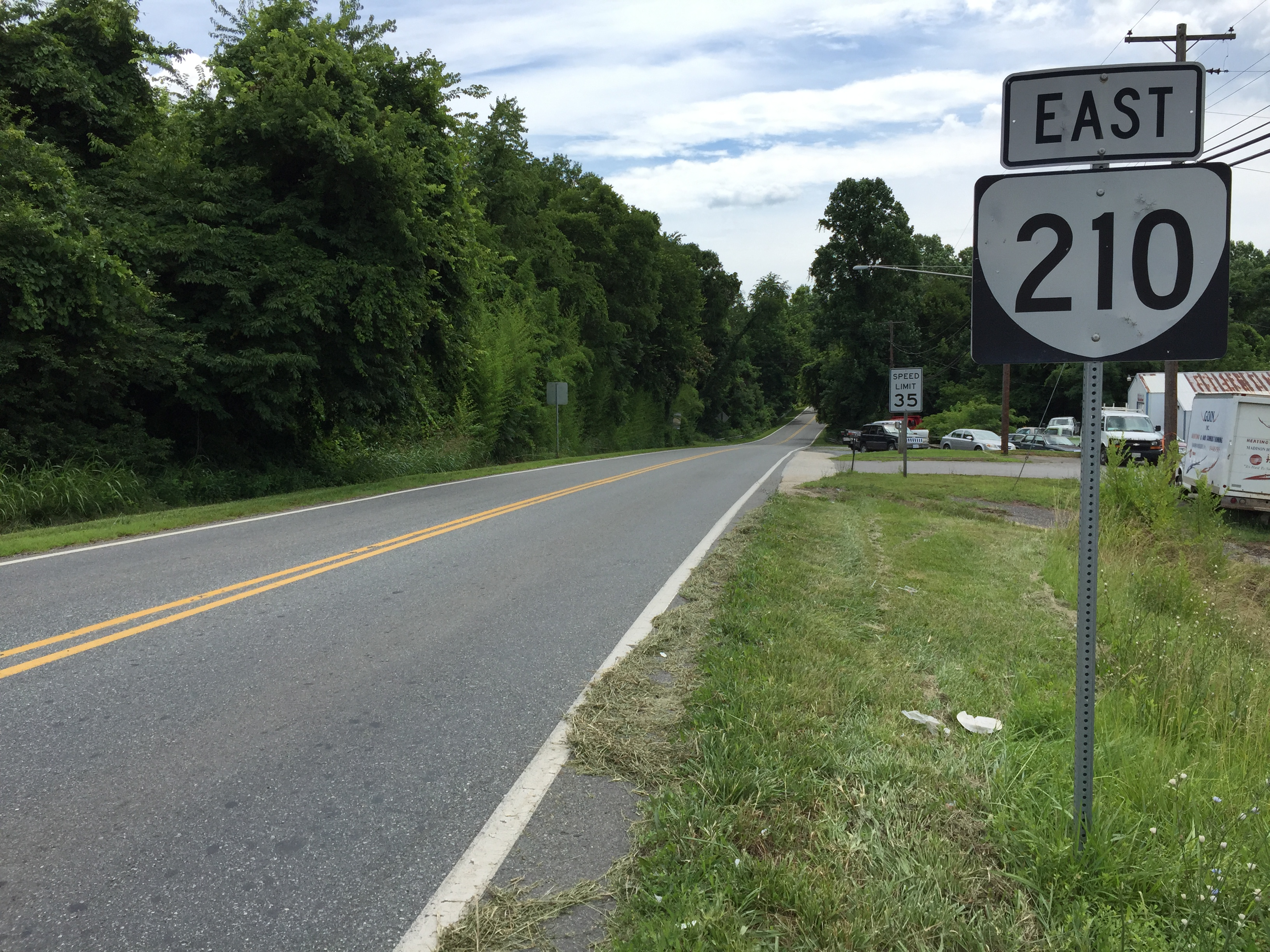
View east at the west end of SR 210 at SR 163 in Madison Heights

SR 210 begins at an intersection with SR 163 (Amherst Highway) in Madison Heights on the opposite side of the James River from Lynchburg. The state highway heads east as a two-lane undivided road until just west of its diamond interchange with US 29 Business (Lynchburg Expressway), where the highway expands to a four-lane divided highway. SR 210's next intersection east of the expressway is with SR 334 (Colony Road). SR 334 is the access road to the Central Virginia Training Center, which was formerly the notorious Virginia State Colony for Epileptics and Feebleminded. SR 210 has no cross traffic until its intersection with SR 672 (Riverview Road) just west of its partial cloverleaf interchange with US 29. The state highway reduces to two lanes at the interchange's southbound ramps and reaches its eastern terminus at the northbound US 29 ramps. The roadway continues east as SR 672 (Riverview Road), which serves the peninsula of land within a bend of the James River.

== Major intersections ==
The entire route is in Amherst County.

Location	mi	km	Destinations	Notes
Madison Heights	0.00	0.00	SR 163 (South Amherst Highway) – Randolph College	Western terminus
Madison Heights	0.54	0.87	US 29 Bus. – Amherst, Lynchburg, Lynchburg Downtown Historic District	Diamond interchange
Madison Heights	0.73	1.17	SR 334 south (Colony Road) / SR 622 (Wright Shop Road) – Central Virginia Training Center	
	3.14	5.05	US 29 / SR 672 east (Historic Riverview Way) to US 460 – Amherst, Appomattox, Danville	interchange; eastern terminus
1.000 mi = 1.609 km; 1.000 km = 0.621 mi

< SR 310	District 3 State Routes; 1928–1933	SR 312 >
