= Bragassa Toy Store =

Historic commercial building in Virginia, United States

- U.S. National Register of Historic Places
- Virginia Landmarks Register
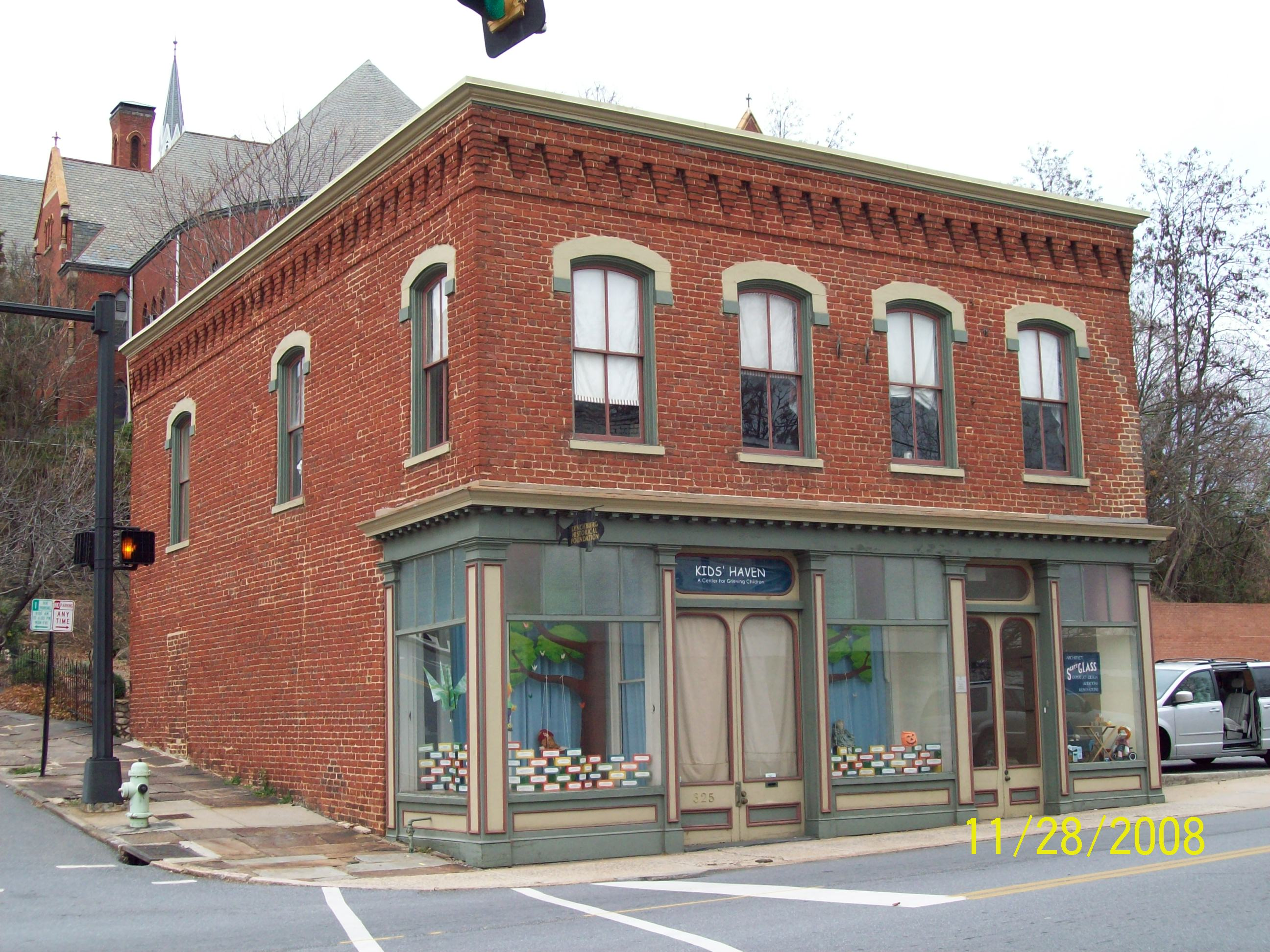
- Bragassa Toy Store, Lynchburg VA, November 2008

- Location within Virginia Location within the United States
- Location: 323--325 Twelfth St., Lynchburg, Virginia
- Coordinates: 37°24′41″N 79°8′32″W
- Area: less than one acre
- Built: 1875
- Architectural style: Italianate
- NRHP reference No.: 90002136
- VLR No.: 118-0176

Significant dates
- Added to NRHP: January 11, 1991
- Designated VLR: August 21, 1990

The Bragassa Toy Store is a historic commercial building located in Lynchburg, Virginia, United States. In 1871, Francisco Bragassa purchased the property and in 1875 to 1876, he built the confectionery and toy store in Italianate style. The Bragassa store was at the center of a new, expanding commercial section of town during the Reconstruction period. It is the only surviving building within a four-block area that represents this commercial expansion. The building contains comfortable living quarters upstairs, with the merchandise on the ground floor. At the front of the shop were the first plate glass windows ever installed in Lynchburg. The store remained in the Bragassa family until 1987. In January 1988 the Lynchburg Historical Foundation purchased the building from the Bragassa family. In November 2008, the building was occupied by Kid's Haven: A Center for Grieving Children.

It was listed on the National Register of Historic Places in 1991.
