= Rosedale (Lynchburg, Virginia) =

Historic house in Virginia, United States

- U.S. National Register of Historic Places
- Virginia Landmarks Register
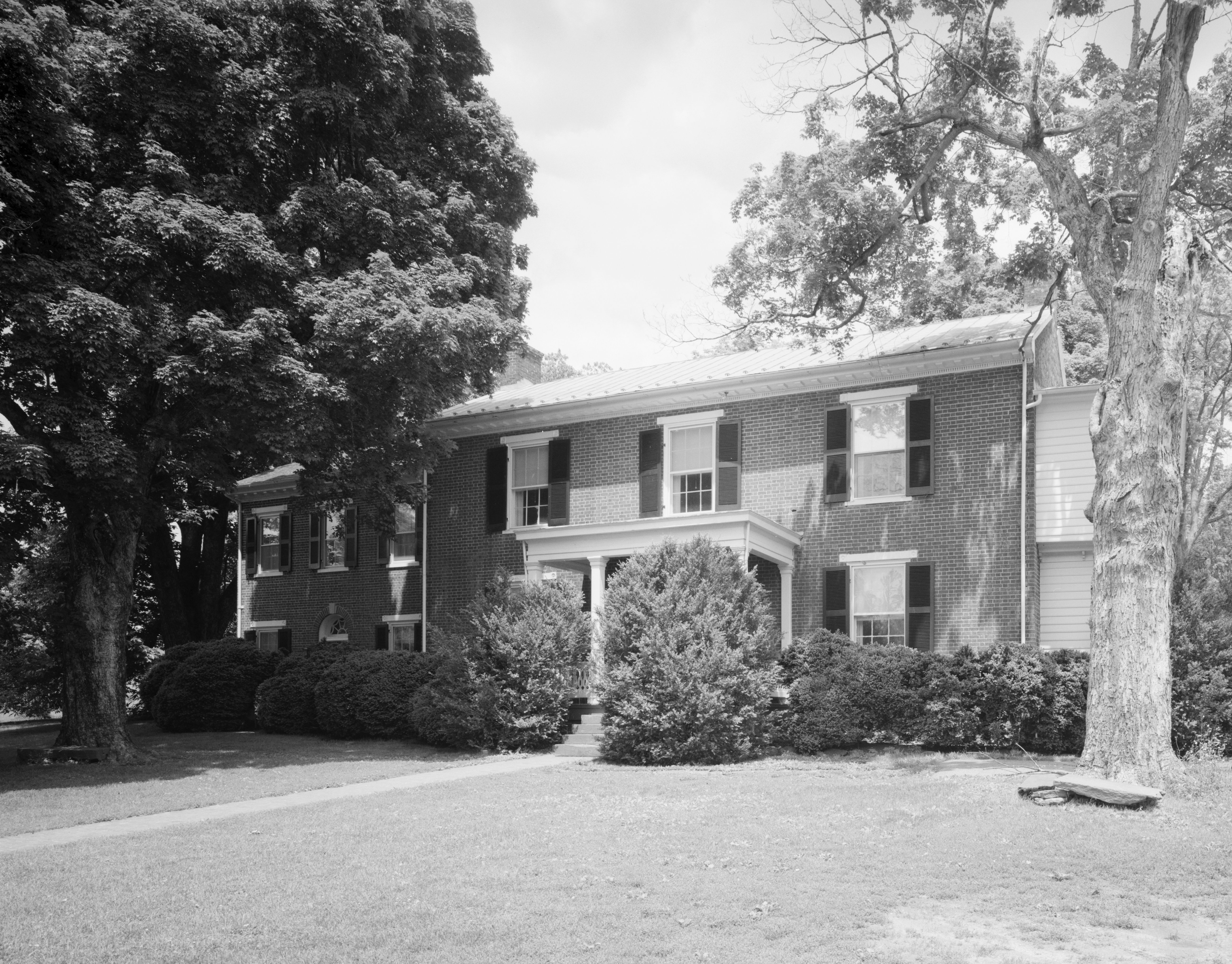
- Rosedale, HABS Photo, July 1979

- Location within Virginia Location within the United States
- Location: Old Graves Mill Rd., Lynchburg, Virginia
- Coordinates: 37°22′34″N 79°13′44″W
- Area: 61.7 acres (25.0 ha)
- Built: 1764
- Architectural style: Greek Revival
- NRHP reference No.: 83003291, 92000240 (Boundary Increase)
- VLR No.: 118-0201

Significant dates
- Added to NRHP: July 7, 1983, April 10, 1992 (Boundary Increase)
- Designated VLR: October 19, 1982, December 11, 1991

Rosedale, a historic property comprising the Graves Mill ruins, Christopher Johnson Cottage, and Rosedale mansion, is located at Lynchburg, Virginia. The Rosedale property contains two buildings of major importance, the ruins of an 18th-century grist mill, and numerous subsidiary buildings. The earliest structure remaining is the Christopher Johnson Cottage, dating from ca. 1764 to 1774. The small, 1 1/2-story frame structure has long been known as the Johnson Cottage. The Rosedale mansion was erected in 1836 by Odin Clay, the first president of the Virginia and Tennessee Railroad, and is a two-story, three-bay, brick home laid in Flemish bond. The house was enlarged in 1929; a three-bay brick wing was added the original house. It was designed by Lynchburg architect Stanhope S. Johnson, who is best known for designing the Allied Arts Building.

It was listed on the National Register of Historic Places in 1983, with a boundary increase in 1992.
