= Federal Hill Historic District (Lynchburg, Virginia) =

Historic district in Virginia, United States

- U.S. National Register of Historic Places
- U.S. Historic district
- Virginia Landmarks Register
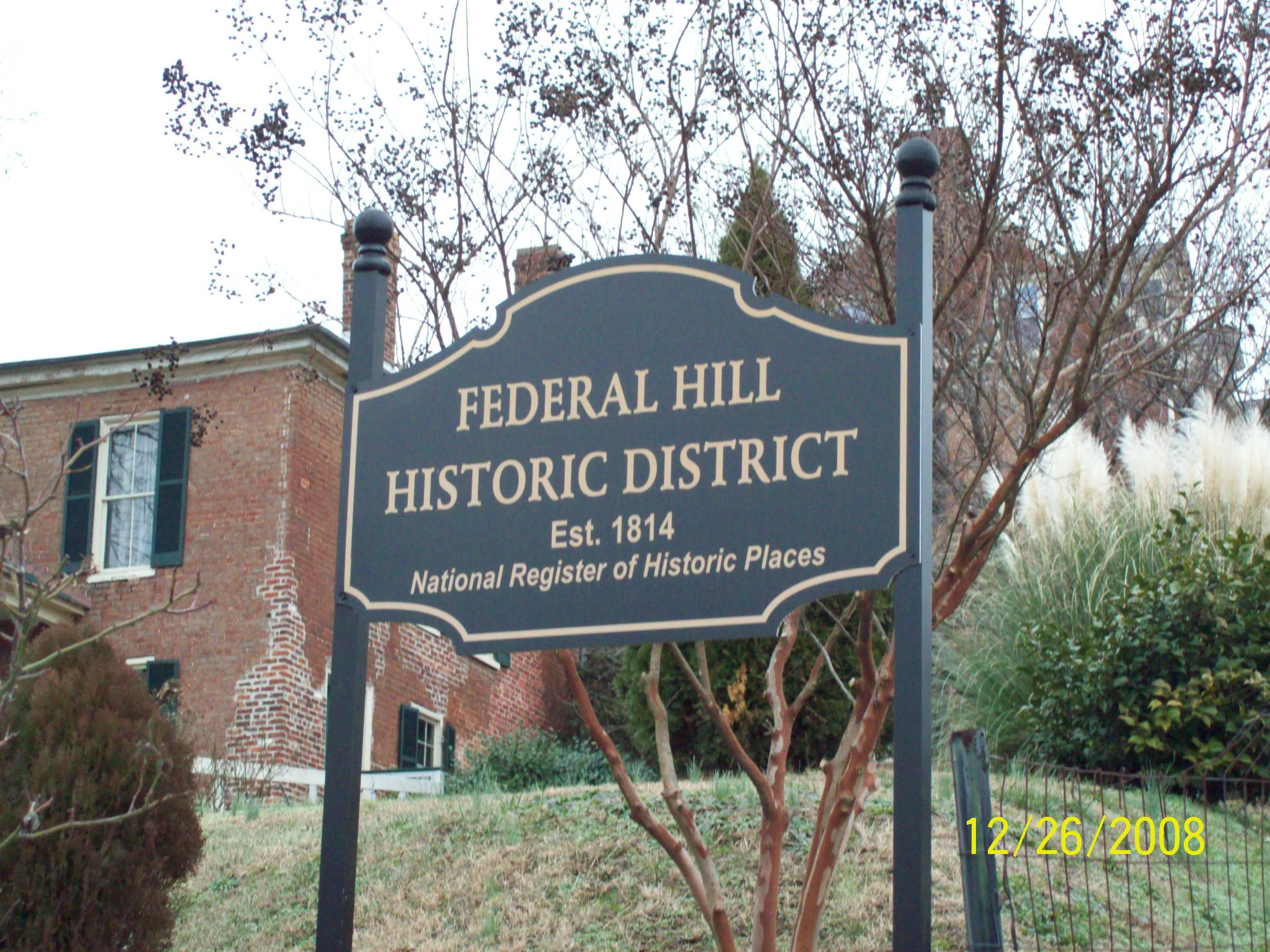
- Federal Hill Historic District Sign, December 2008

- Location within Virginia Location within the United States
- Location: Roughly bounded by 8th, 12th, Harrison and Polk Sts., Lynchburg, Virginia
- Coordinates: 37°24′39″N 79°8′51″W
- Built: 1819
- Architect: Frye, E.G.
- Architectural style: Greek Revival, Second Empire, Queen Anne
- NRHP reference No.: 80004310
- VLR No.: 118-0056

Significant dates
- Added to NRHP: September 17, 1980
- Designated VLR: May 20, 1980

The Federal Hill Historic District is a national historic district located in Lynchburg, Virginia. The district includes some one dozen residential blocks in the heart of Lynchburg spread over 33 acres (130,000 m^{2}). The district's architecture consists primarily of free-standing brick or frame houses in a variety of styles but of harmonious scale. Included are three important French Second Empire houses standing near one another on Harrison Street. There is also a notable assemblage of free-standing dwellings in architectural styles ranging in date from the early 19th century through the Edwardian styles of the early 20th century. There is an important collection of early Federal-style townhouses.

It was listed on the National Register of Historic Places in 1980.

== Gallery ==
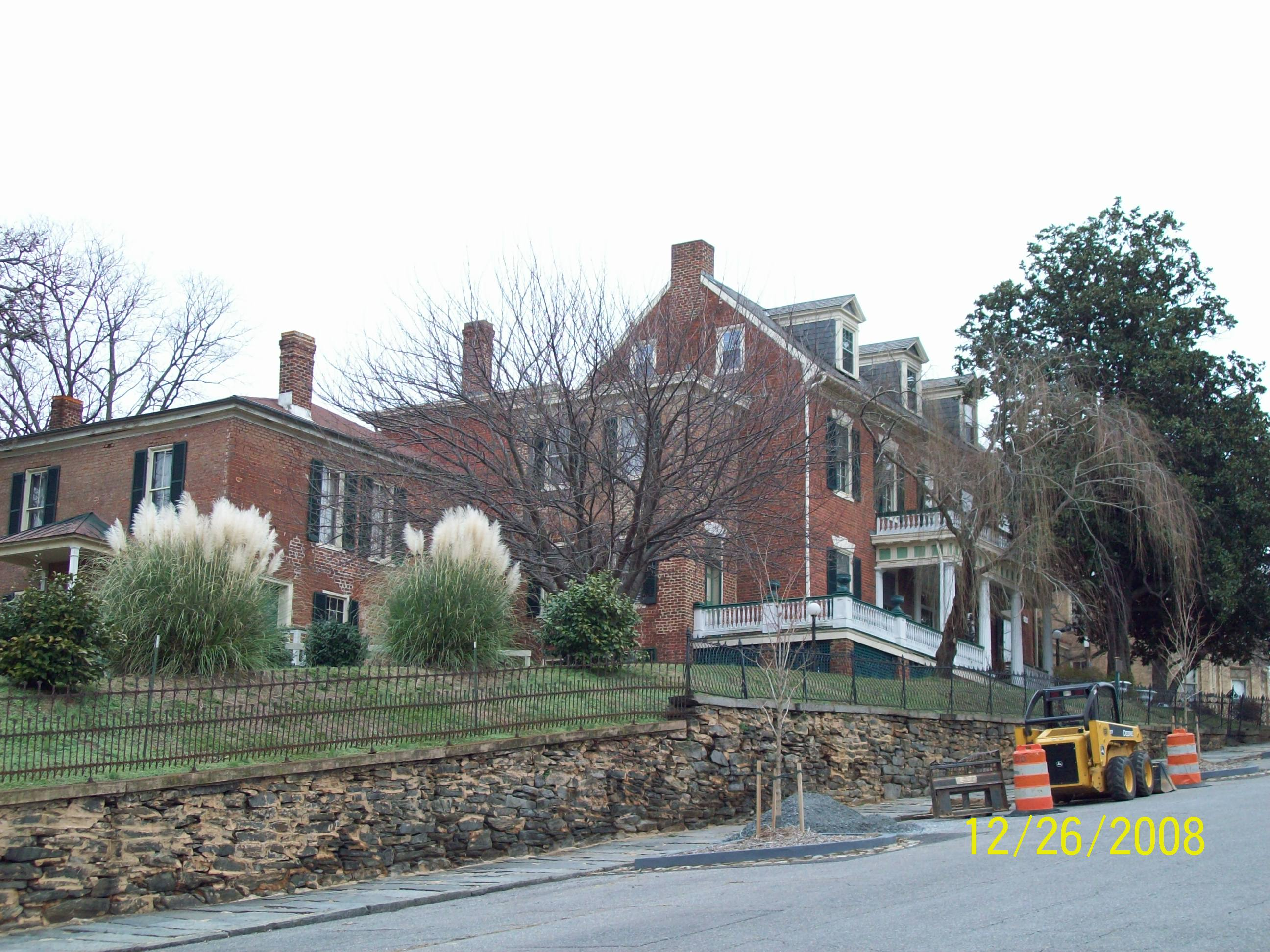
Federal Hill Historic District house, Lynchburg VA, December 2008

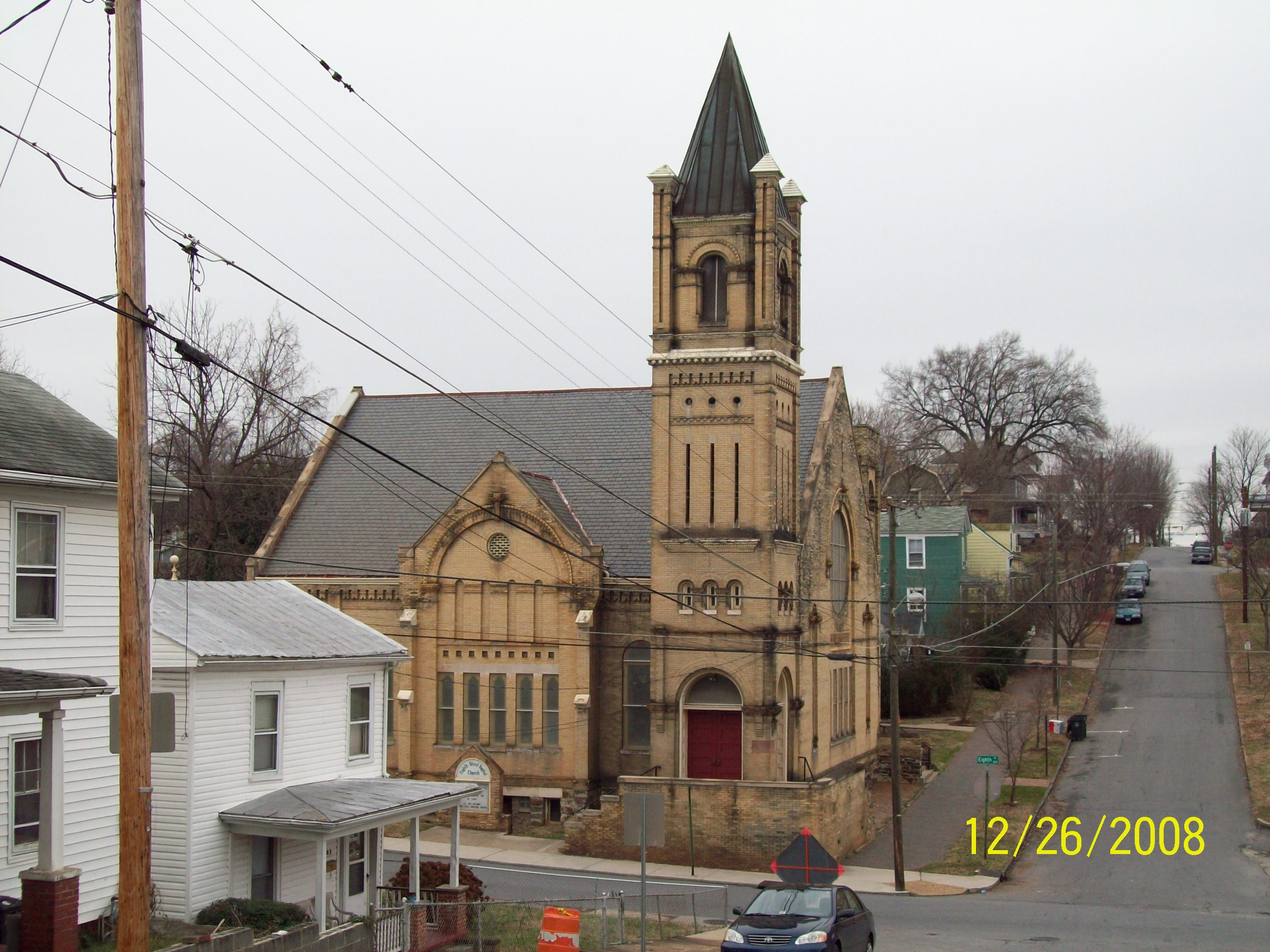
Federal Hill Historic District, Eighth St. Baptist Church, Lynchburg VA, December 2008

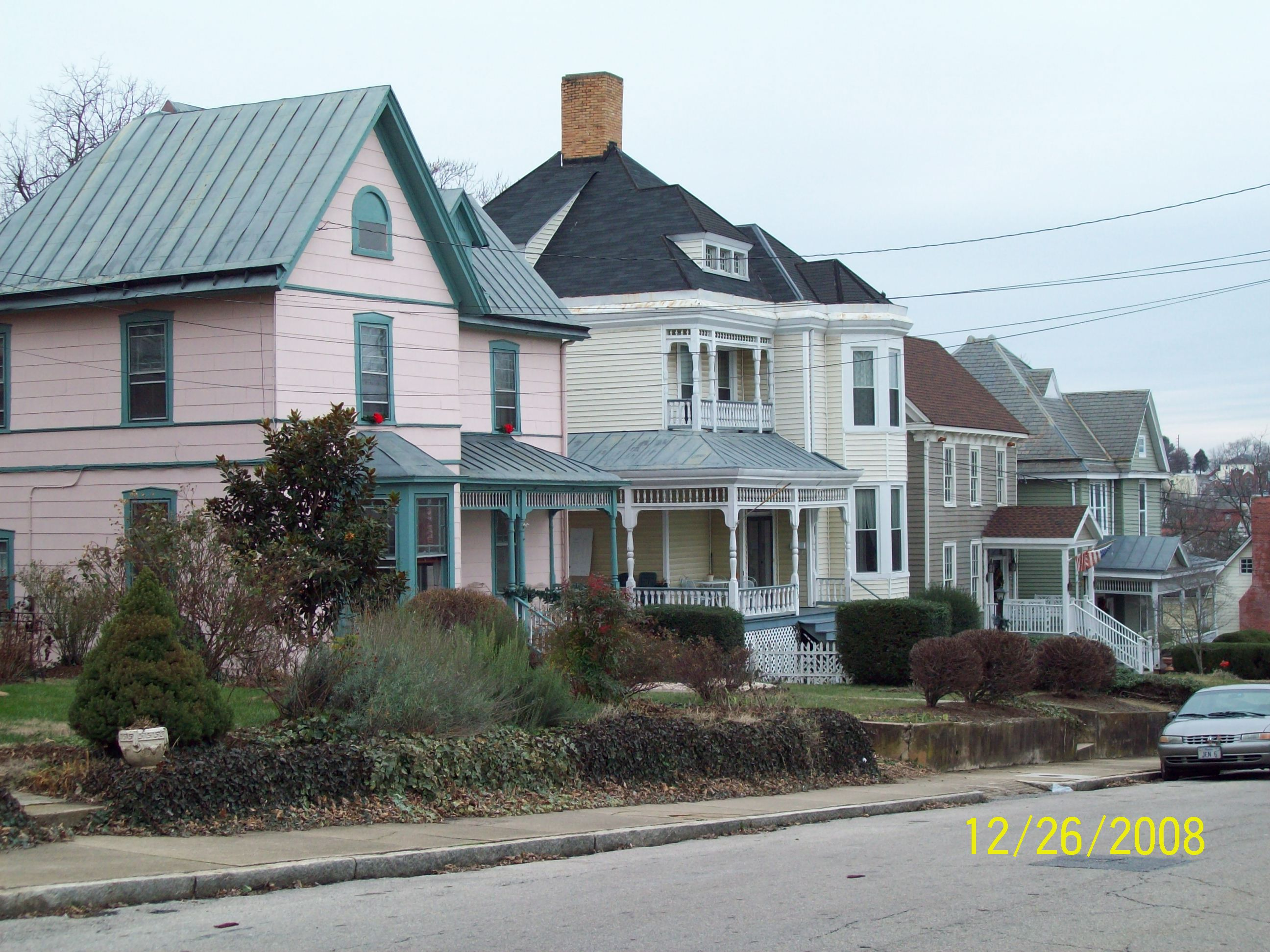
Federal Hill Historic District houses, Lynchburg VA, December 2008
