= Garland Hill Historic District =

Historic district in Virginia, United States

- U.S. National Register of Historic Places
- U.S. Historic district
- Virginia Landmarks Register
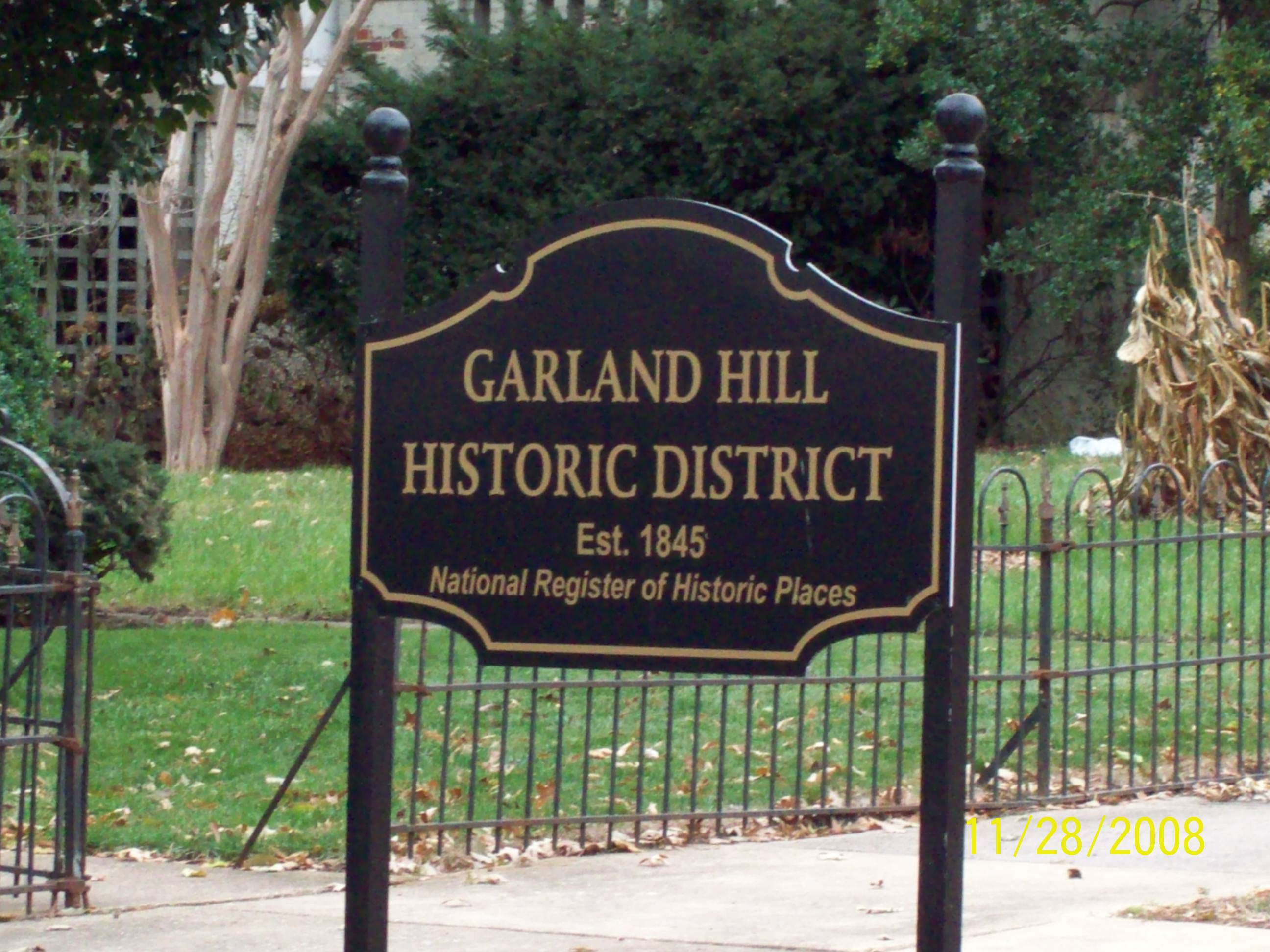
- Garland Hill Historic District Sign, Lynchburg VA, November 2008

- Location within Virginia Location within the United States
- Location: Bounded roughly by 5th St., Federal Ave., and Norfolk Western Ry. tracks, Lynchburg, Virginia
- Coordinates: 37°25′3″N 79°9′3″W
- Area: 10 acres (4.0 ha)
- Built: 1817
- Architect: Frye, Edward; Stanhope S. Johnson
- Architectural style: Late Victorian, Queen Anne, Gothic Revival
- NRHP reference No.: 72001507
- VLR No.: 118-0026

Significant dates
- Added to NRHP: September 07, 1972
- Designated VLR: August 15, 1972

The Garland Hill Historic District is a national historic district located in Lynchburg, Virginia. The area is a small residential neighborhood incorporating the summit of one of the numerous hills surround downtown Lynchburg. The neighborhood was home to many of Lynchburg's oldest and most distinguished families, many of whom were associated with the tobacco industry. Buildings in the district represent a variety of styles from the early 19th century through the early 20th century including the Gothic Revival, Victorian, and Queen Anne styles, some of which were designed by Lynchburg architects Edward Frye and Stanhope S. Johnson.

It was listed on the National Register of Historic Places in 1972.

== Gallery ==
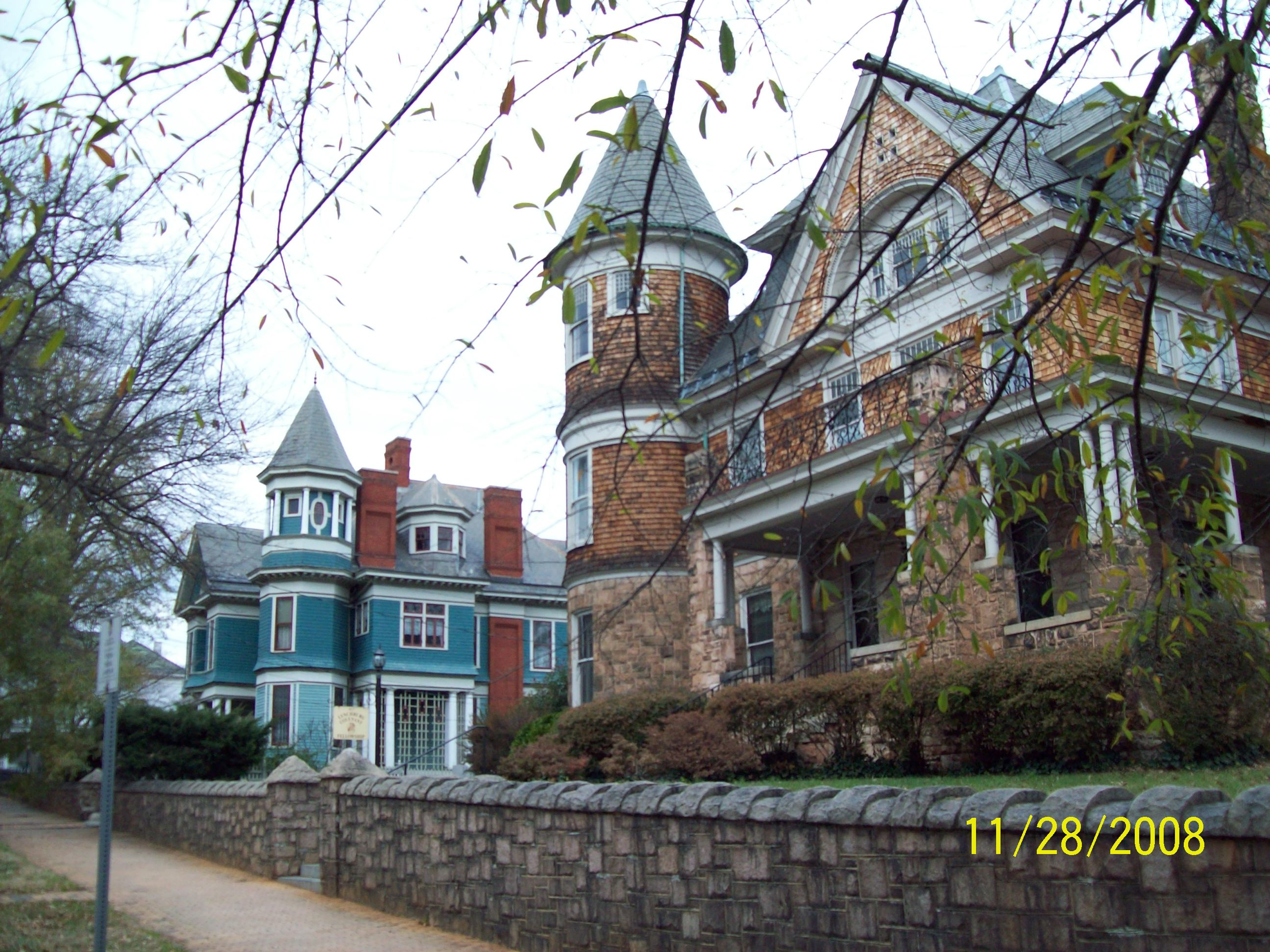
Garland Hill Historic District, Lynchburg VA, November 2008
