= William Phaup House =

Historic house in Virginia, United States

- U.S. National Register of Historic Places
- U.S. Historic district – Contributing property
- Virginia Landmarks Register
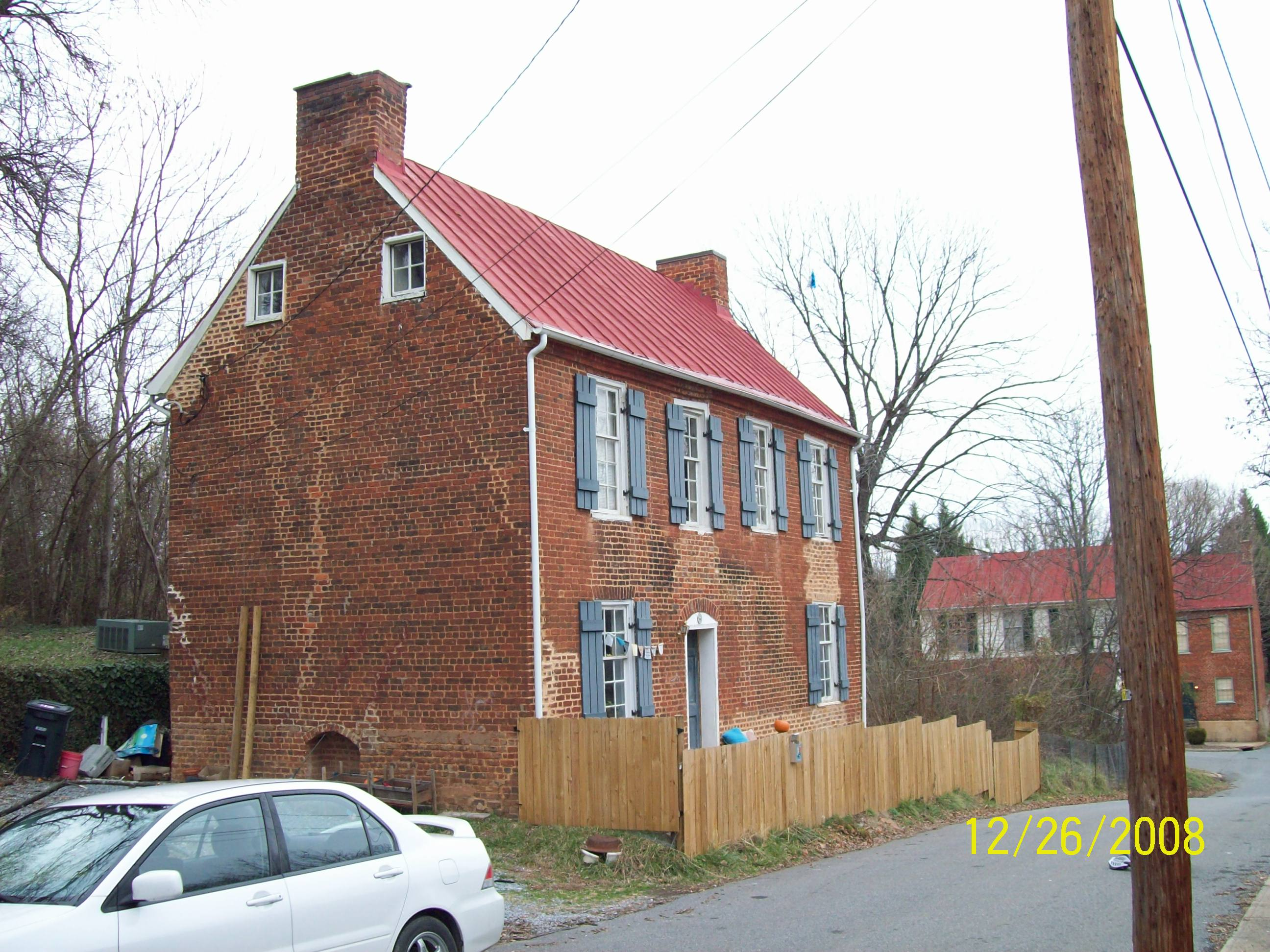
- William Phaup House, December 2008

- Location within Virginia Location within the United States
- Location: 911 Sixth St., Lynchburg, Virginia
- Coordinates: 37°24′48″N 79°9′6″W
- Area: less than one acre
- Built: 1817
- Architect: Phaup, William
- Architectural style: Federal
- NRHP reference No.: 02000182
- VLR No.: 118-0226-0246

Significant dates
- Added to NRHP: March 13, 2002
- Designated VLR: December 5, 2001

The William Phaup House is a historic home located in Lynchburg, Virginia. It is a modest two story, four bay Federal style brick dwelling constructed about 1817. It is named after its architect and original occupant, William Phaup. Very few alterations have been made to the house since its construction.

It was listed on the National Register of Historic Places in 2002. It is located in the Fifth Street Historic District.
