= Kentucky Hotel =

- U.S. National Register of Historic Places
- U.S. Historic district – Contributing property
- Virginia Landmarks Register
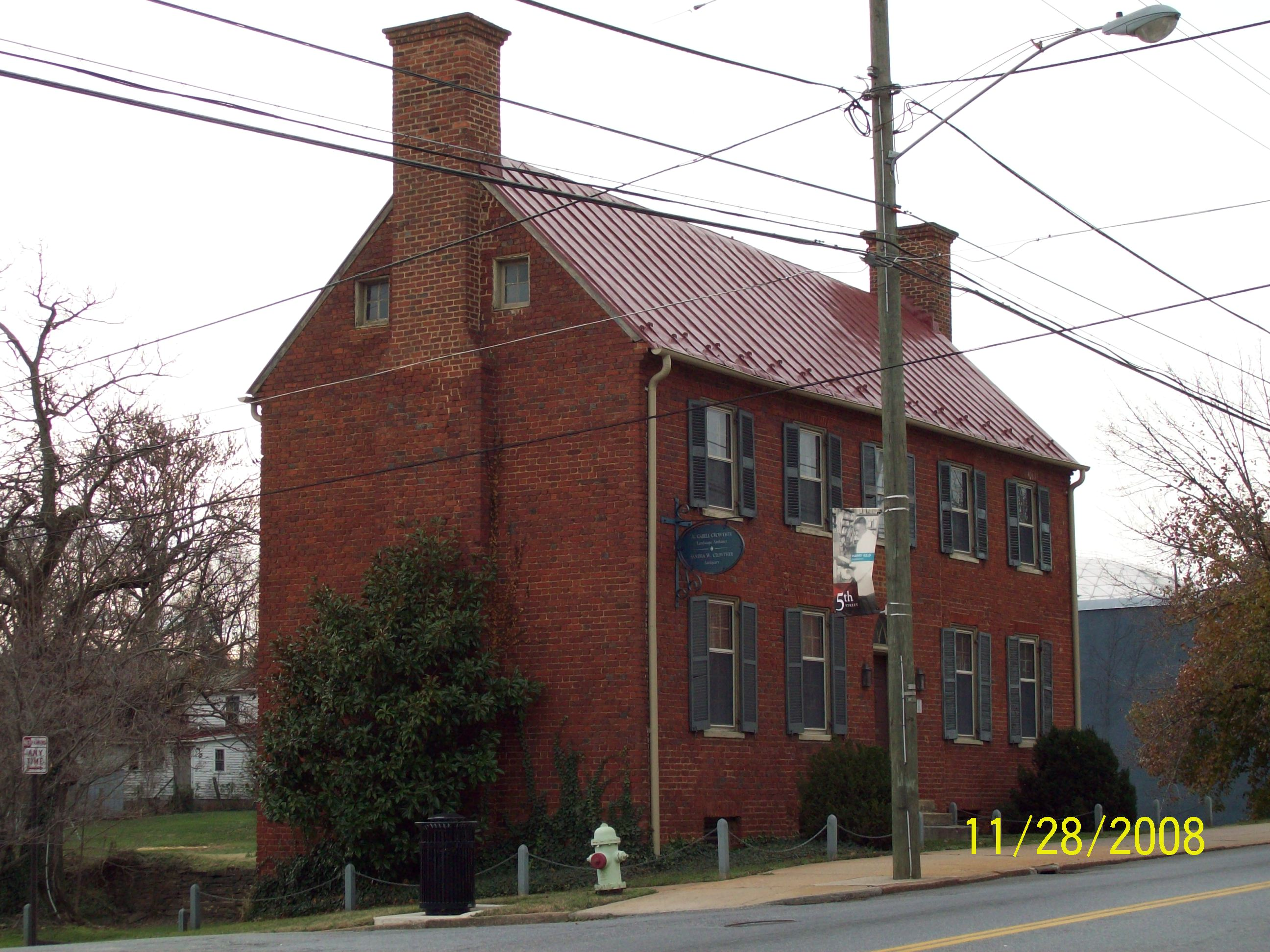
- Kentucky Hotel, Lynchburg VA, November 2008

- Location within Virginia Location within the United States
- Location: 900 Fifth St., Lynchburg, Virginia
- Coordinates: 37°24′52″N 79°9′3″W
- Area: less than one acre
- Built: c. 1800
- Architectural style: Federal
- NRHP reference No.: 86003468
- VLR No.: 118-0177

Significant dates
- Added to NRHP: December 11, 1986
- Designated VLR: June 17, 1986

The Kentucky Hotel is a historic hotel building located at Lynchburg, Virginia. It is one of Lynchburg's three remaining early 19th century ordinaries. It was probably built before 1800, and is a 2 1/2-story structure of brick laid in Flemish bond. In about 1814, two side bays were completed, converting the house to a center hall plan.

It was listed on the National Register of Historic Places in 1986. and is located in the Fifth Street Historic District.
