= Lynch's Brickyard House =

Historic house in Virginia, United States

- U.S. National Register of Historic Places
- Virginia Landmarks Register
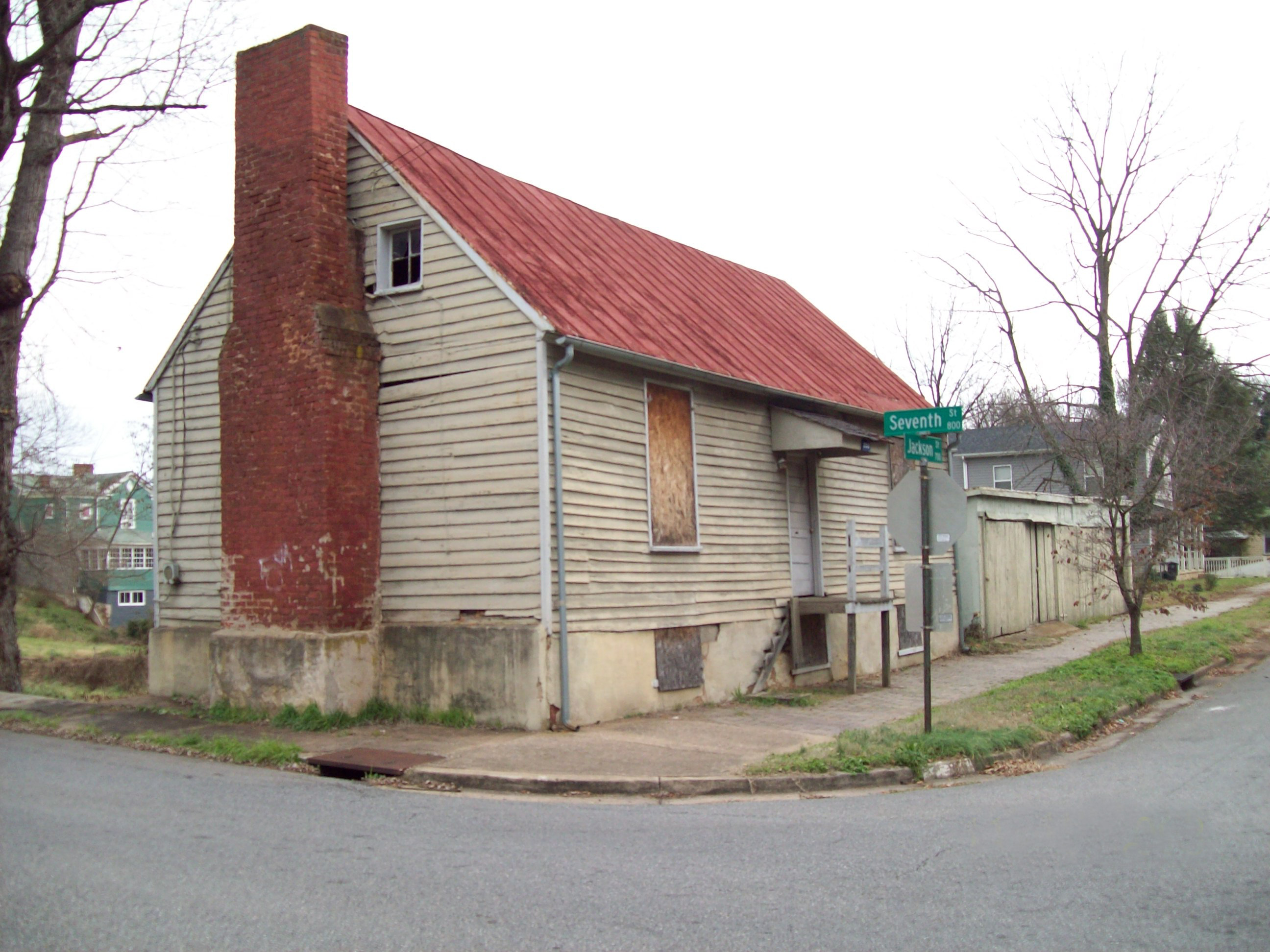
- Lynch's Brickyard House in 2008

- Location within Virginia Location within the United States
- Location: 700 Jackson St., Lynchburg, Virginia
- Coordinates: 37°24′45″N 79°9′0″W
- Area: less than one acre
- Built: 1849
- NRHP reference No.: 02000180
- VLR No.: 118-0226-0178

Significant dates
- Added to NRHP: March 13, 2002
- Designated VLR: March 13, 2002

Lynch's Brickyard House is a historic home located at Lynchburg, Virginia. It consists of a dwelling built about 1849 and two garages built about 1922, all of which are constructed directly on the lot line along Jackson Street. The dwelling is a one-story, three-bay frame structure with a stone pier foundation, weatherboard siding, and metal gable roof with exterior-end chimneys. The house is a rare surviving example of the modest, vernacular-style dwellings built in Lynchburg in the mid 19th century by artisans, tradesmen and other middle-class settlers.

It was listed on the National Register of Historic Places in 2002.
