= Western Hotel (Lynchburg, Virginia) =

Historic building in Virginia, US

- U.S. National Register of Historic Places
- U.S. Historic district – Contributing property
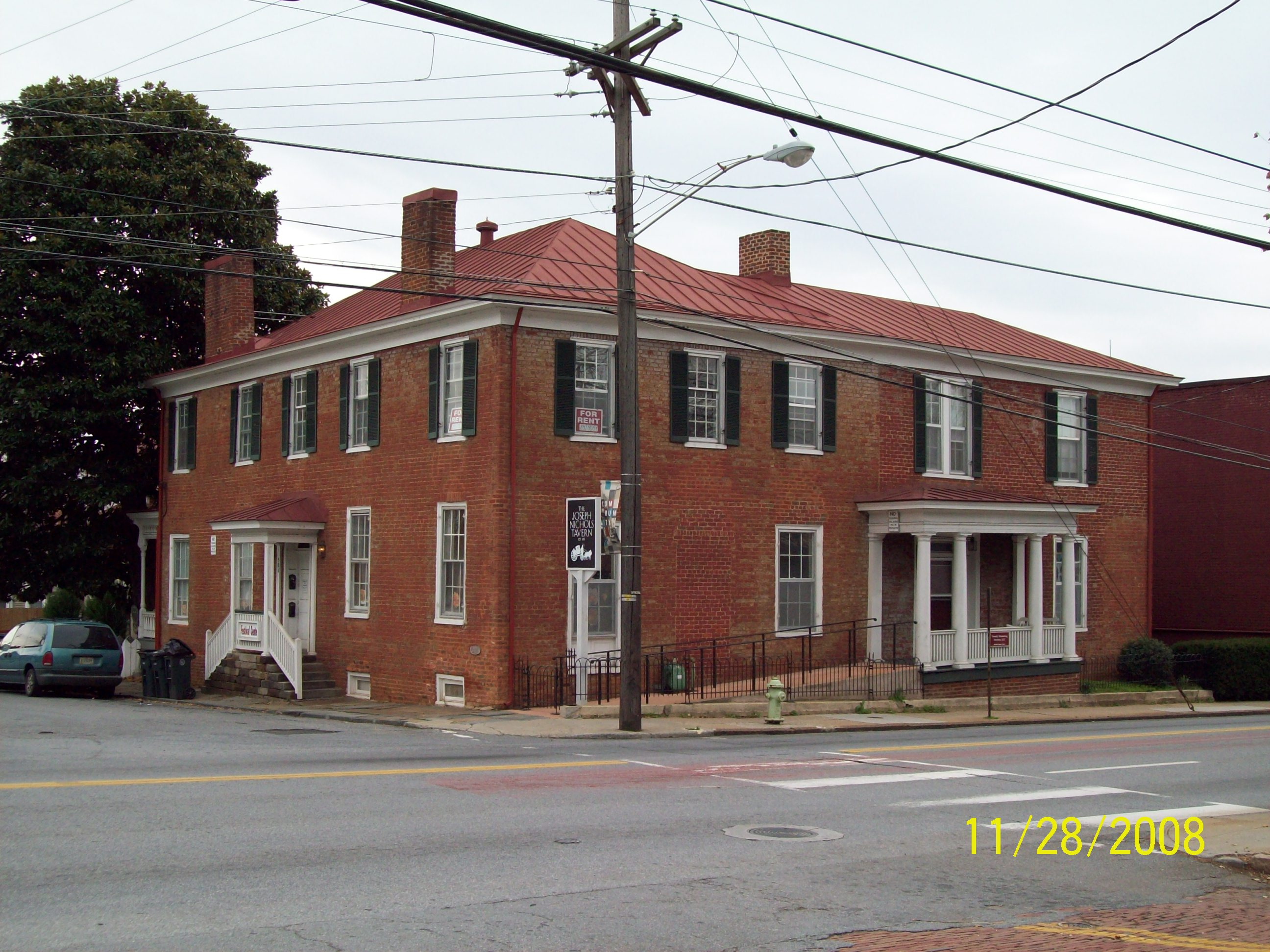
- Western Hotel, Lynchburg VA, November 2008

- Location within Virginia Location within the United States
- Location: 5th and Madison Sts., Lynchburg, Virginia
- Coordinates: 37°24′57″N 79°8′57″W
- Area: less than one acre
- Architectural style: Federal
- NRHP reference No.: 74002236
- Added to NRHP: July 22, 1974

The Western Hotel, or Joseph Nichols' Tavern, is a historic building located at Lynchburg, Virginia. It is the last of the city's many ante-bellum taverns and ordinaries, and is an important example of early Federal-style commercial architecture. It stands at what was for many years the western entrance to the city. It is known to have been operated as a tavern as early as 1815 by Joseph Nichols.

It was listed on the National Register of Historic Places in 1974. It is located in the Fifth Street Historic District.
