= Pyramid Motors =

Historic commercial building in Virginia, United States

- U.S. National Register of Historic Places
- U.S. Historic district – Contributing property
- Virginia Landmarks Register
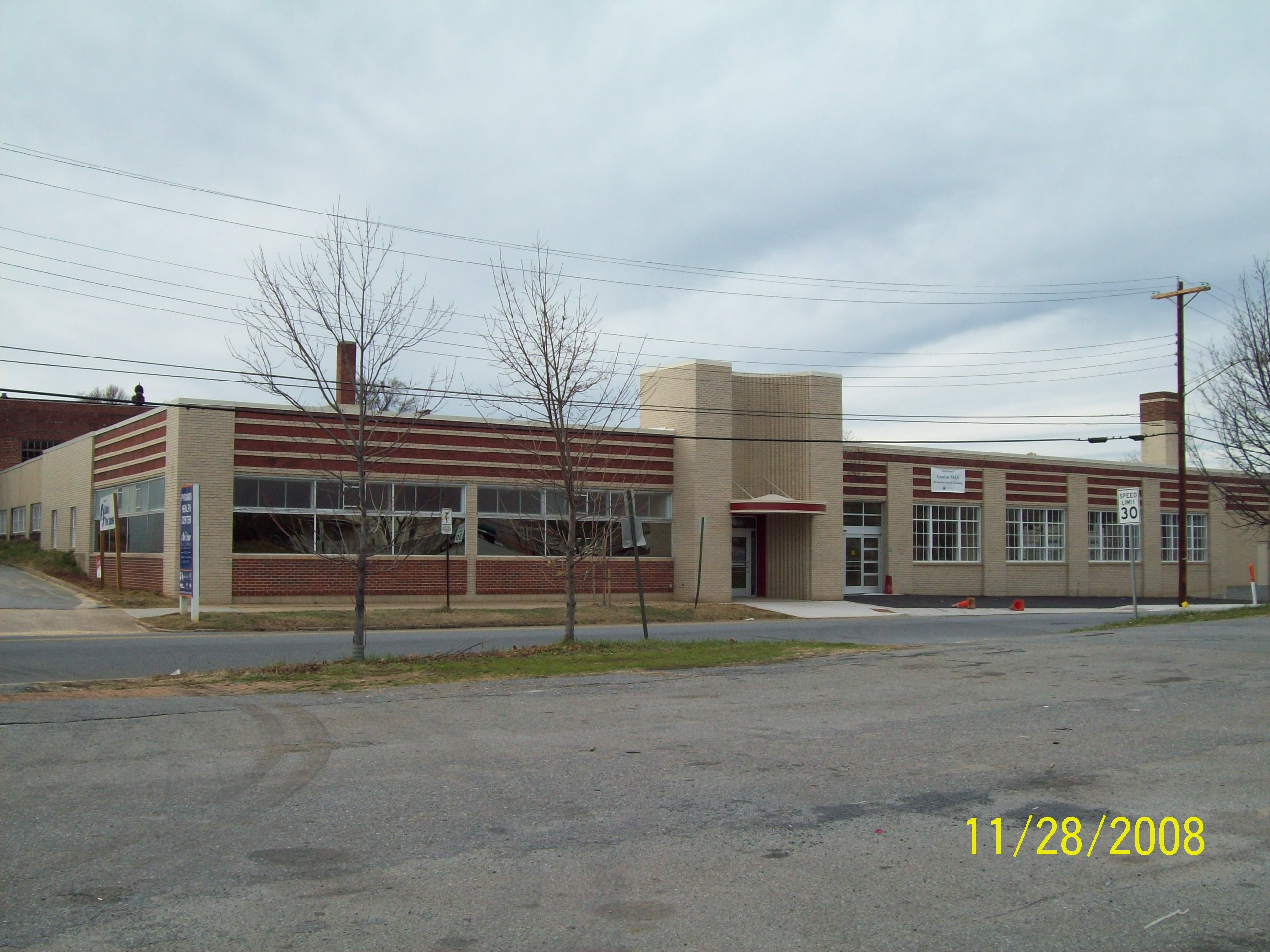
- Pyramid Motors, Lynchburg VA, November 2008

- Location within Virginia Location within the United States
- Location: 405-407 Federal St., Lynchburg, Virginia
- Coordinates: 37°24′56″N 79°9′6″W
- Area: less than one acre
- Built: 1937
- Architectural style: Moderne
- NRHP reference No.: 07001140
- VLR No.: 118-5237

Significant dates
- Added to NRHP: November 1, 2007
- Designated VLR: September 5, 2007

Pyramid Motors is a historic automobile showroom building located at Lynchburg, Virginia, United States. It is a one-story building with a yellow brick façade with contrasting red-brick details constructed in 1937. The building presented, like the Lincoln-Zephyr that the dealership sold, a streamlined, "modern" appearance in the Art Deco style.

It was listed on the National Register of Historic Places in 2007. It is located in the Fifth Street Historic District.
