= Lynchburg Hospital =

- U.S. National Register of Historic Places
- Virginia Landmarks Register
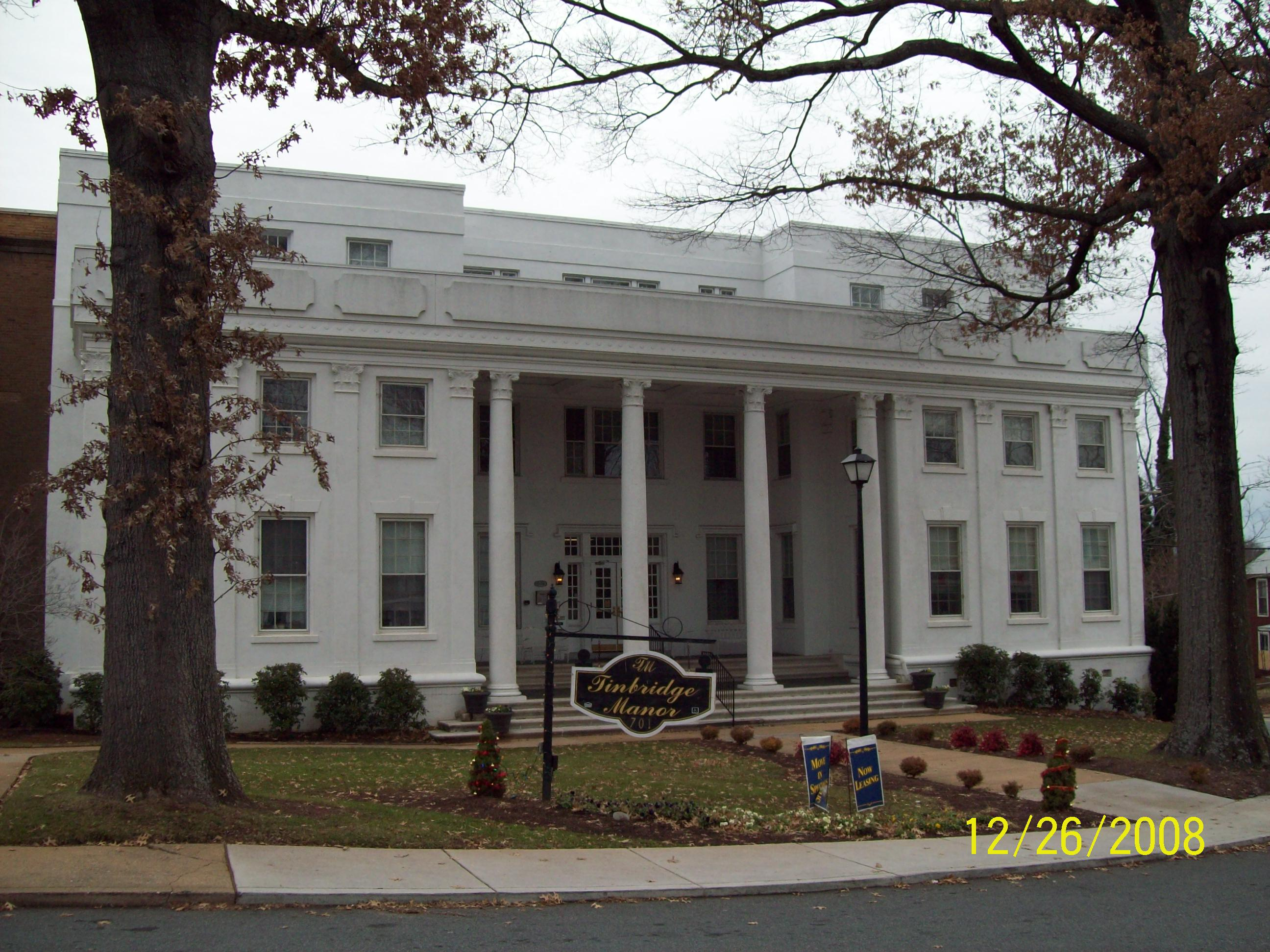
- Lynchburg Hospital, December 2008

- Location within Virginia Location within the United States
- Location: 701-709 Hollins Mill Rd., Lynchburg, Virginia
- Coordinates: 37°25′12″N 79°9′21″W
- Area: 4.4 acres (1.8 ha)
- Built: 1911
- Built by: Lewis, J.M.B.; et al.
- Architectural style: Classical Revival, Colonial Revival
- NRHP reference No.: 99001506
- VLR No.: 118-5160

Significant dates
- Added to NRHP: December 9, 1999
- Designated VLR: September 15, 1999

The Lynchburg Hospital is a historic hospital complex located on the corner of Federal Street and Hollins Mill Road in Lynchburg, Virginia. It consists of the main hospital building, the nurse's home, an office building, a picnic pavilion, a storage building, and a boiler building. It was built in 1911 by the City of Lynchburg to serve as the city's municipal hospital. As designed, the original hospital was divided into two sections, a three-story main block and a rear annex, featuring Georgian Revival detailing. It is now a known as Elora Gardens at Lynchburg. A section 8 property.

It was listed on the National Register of Historic Places in 1999.
