= Lower Basin Historic District =

Historic district in Virginia, United States

- U.S. National Register of Historic Places
- U.S. Historic district
- Virginia Landmarks Register
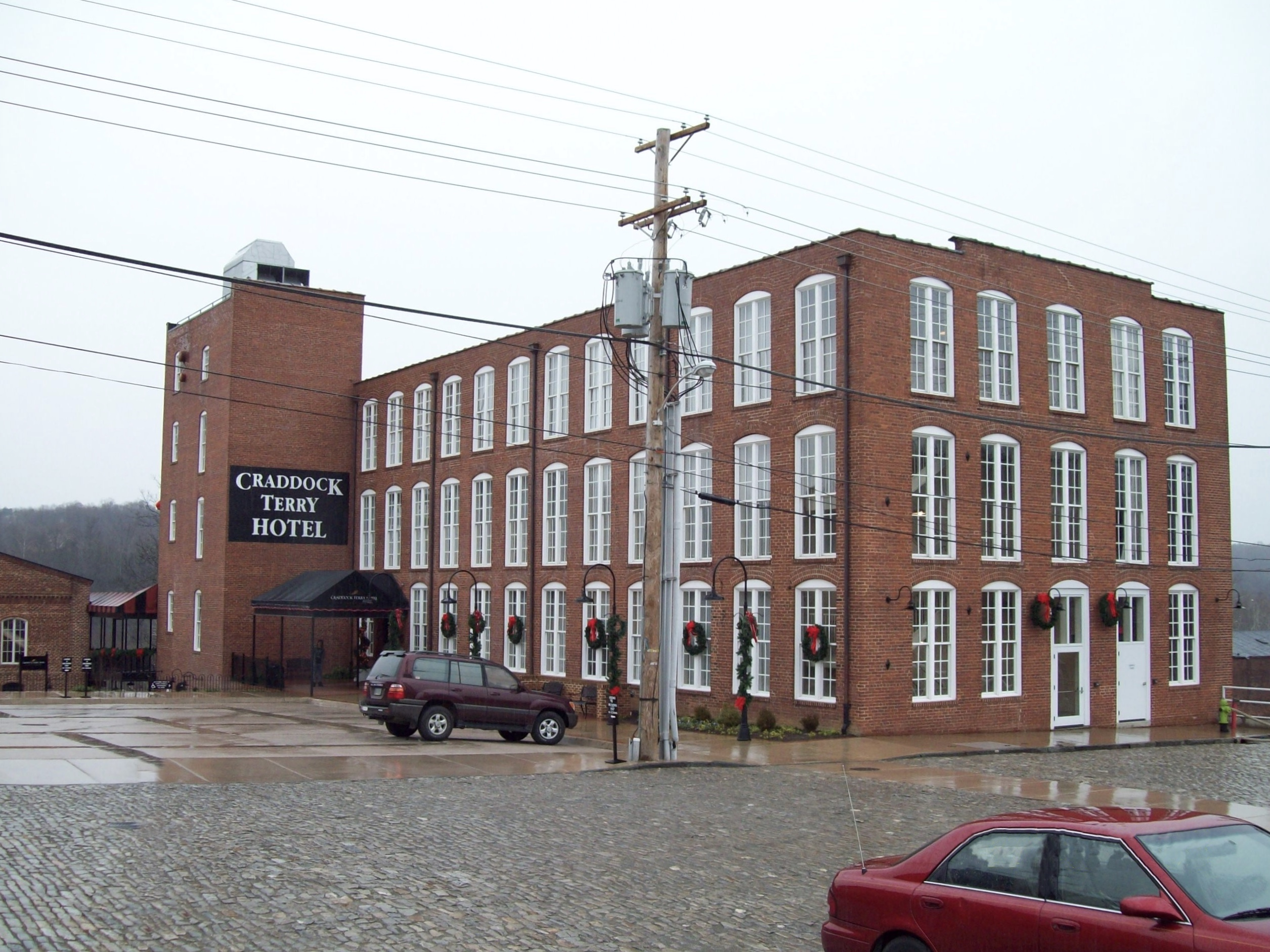
- Craddock Terry Hotel, December 2008

- Location within Virginia Location within the United States
- Location: 700-1300 blocks of Jefferson St., 600--1300 blocks of Commerce St., and 1200--1300 Blks. of Main St., 1307 Main St., 103-109 Sixth St. Lynchburg, Virginia
- Coordinates: 37°24′52″N 79°8′21″W
- Area: 52 acres (21 ha)
- Architect: Davis, B.H.; Johnson, Stanhope; Et al.
- Architectural style: Late 19th And 20th Century Revivals, Italianate, Romanesque
- NRHP reference No.: 87000601 (original); 02000620 (increase 1); 100009146 (increase 2)
- VLR No.: 118-0211

Significant dates
- Added to NRHP: April 24, 1987
- Boundary increases: June 06, 2002; July 18, 2023
- Designated VLR: October 14, 1986, June 13, 2001, April 30, 2008

The Lower Basin Historic District is a national historic district located in Lynchburg, Virginia. The district defines a commercial and industrial warehouse area located between the downtown commercial area to the south and the James River waterfront to the north. The district contains a variety of mostly late 19th- and early 20th-century, multi-story, brick warehouses and factories, two-to-three-story brick commercial buildings, and a number of structures associated with the James River and Kanawha Canal and the Norfolk and Western and Chesapeake and Ohio Railways. The district is named for a wide basin of the canal that once extended between Ninth Street and Horseford Road, and contains 60 contributing buildings, two contributing structures (a viaduct and a stone bridge), and one contributing object-a monument commemorating the site of 18th-century Lynch's Ferry.

It was listed on the National Register of Historic Places in 1987, with boundary increases in 2002 and 2023, and two additional resources added in 2008.
