= Daniel's Hill Historic District =

Historic district in Virginia, United States

- U.S. National Register of Historic Places
- U.S. Historic district
- Virginia Landmarks Register
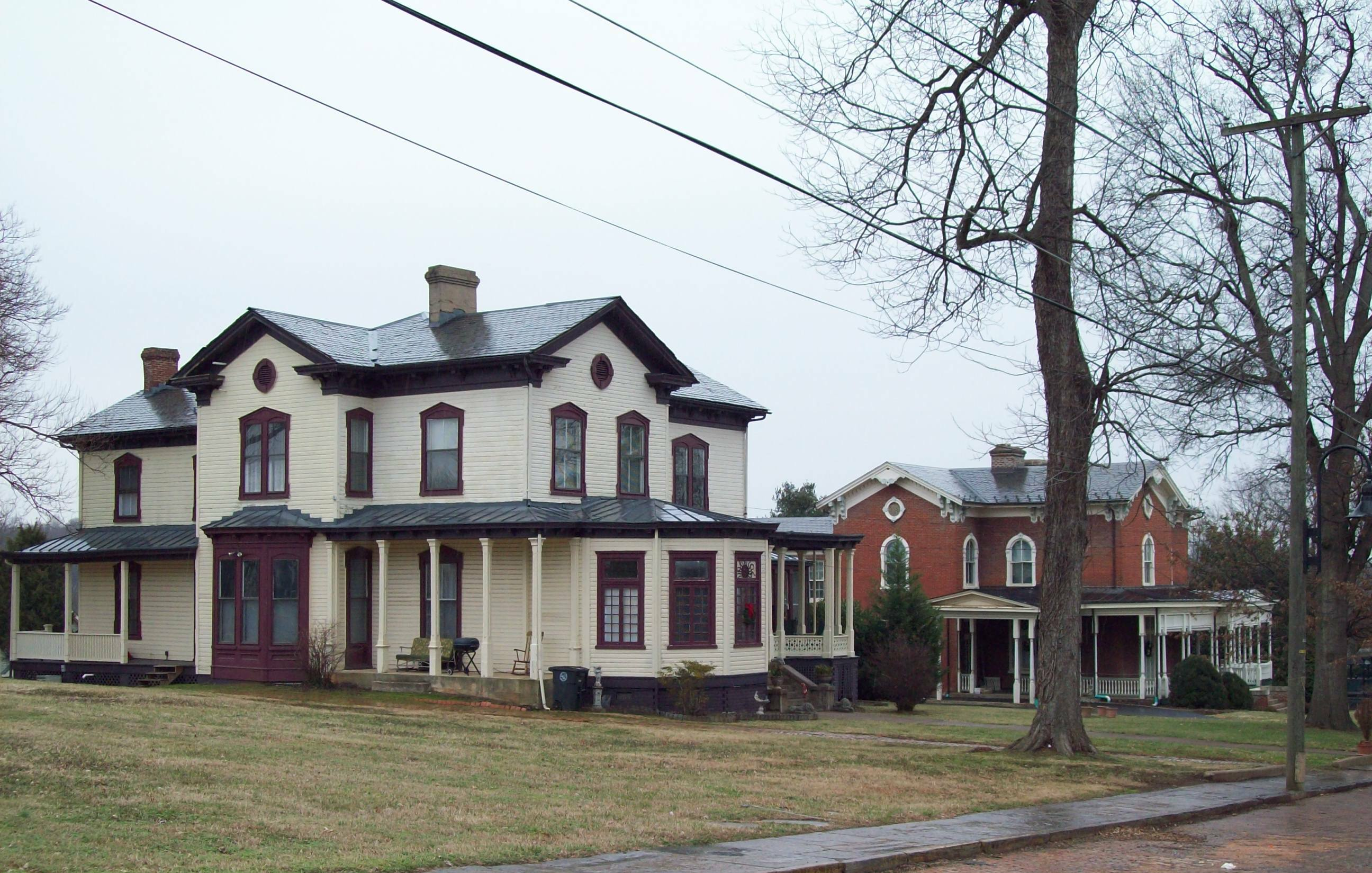

- Location within Virginia Location within the United States
- Location: Cabell, Norwood, Hancock, Stonewall from 6th to H St., Lynchburg, Virginia
- Coordinates: 37°25′21″N 79°8′45″W
- Area: 49 acres (20 ha)
- Architectural style: Late 19th And 20th Century Revivals, Late Victorian
- NRHP reference No.: 83003289
- VLR No.: 118-0198

Significant dates
- Added to NRHP: February 24, 1983
- Designated VLR: December 14, 1982

The Daniel's Hill Historic District is a national historic district located in Lynchburg, Virginia.

== History ==
The district is named after two Lynchburg judges named William Daniel. The senior inherited the plantation surrounding Point of Honor through his wife, who was a descendant of the plantation's founder, George Cabell, who built Point of Honor in the Federal Style popular in 1815. After his death in 1839, it was inherited by his son, also a prominent judge, William Daniel, Jr., who served on the Virginia Court of Appeal, now known as the Virginia Supreme Court. Judge Daniel subdivided the plantation in the mid-1840s, around the time that his wife died giving birth to their daughter and about three years after the birth of their son, John Warwick Daniel. Young John was raised by his maternal grandparents and sent to boarding schools, as his father remarried (to Elizabeth Cabell) and built a new mansion nearby, Rivermont. After a few tenants, the President of the Lynchburg and Tennessee Railroad, Robert L. Owen Sr. acquired Point of Honor, where he lived with his family, including his wife Narcissa Owen and son, the future U.S. Senator Robert L. Owen Jr., before selling the property in 1872 and moving to Norfolk, Virginia where he died unexpectedly young.

Other stately mansions were built north of Point of Honor on Cabell Street, which followed the ridge of long Daniels Hill, beginning in the 1850s. Three large tobacco warehouses stood at the foot of the hill, with housing for workers on side streets and below the hillcrest (where managers and professionals lived). After the Civil War, they were part of the Lynchburg Tobacco Works and a tin and sheet iron foundry which employed many in the neighborhood. Rivermont was partially subdivided by Edward S. Hutter in 1873 and worker housing lots promoted as "Danieltown" around the time a new bridge was built across Blackwater Creek for easier access to the city.

Foundry owner Albert Gallatin Dabney purchased land from Judge Daniel in 1848 and built 405 Cabell Street by 1852-53. However, it became known as "Dabney's Folly" because creditors forced him to sell the newly completed building in 1856. It was acquired by the Adams family in 1882, by which time Lynchburg's prosperity returned after the American Civil War, and they restored and expanded it. Local architect Robert C. Burkholder built his own home at 203 Cabell Street, and designed several other Victorian structures which remain in the district. Local architect Carrington Hubbard designed the mansion at 214 Cabell Street for the President of what had become the Glamorgan Factory Ironworks, McWane. Other mansions are in the Georgian, Queen Anne and Italianate styles.

Although the district had few commercial businesses, it did have small churches, including C Street Baptist on Hancock Street, First Christian Church (in a house at 305 Cabell Street in 1874) and Third Street Presbyterian Church on Cabell and G Streets (built 1875). Christ Episcopal Church was built as a mission church in 1876, and in 1900 sold and converted into a neighborhood grocery.

== Geography ==
The district stretches along the prow of a narrow, elongated hill bordered by the James River on the east and Blackwater Creek on the west. This hill has very steeply sloped sides and is located immediately to the northeast of central Lynchburg. It incorporates about 21 blocks in which are located approximately 180 buildings, virtually all houses ranging in date from the early 19th century through the early 20th century. Architectural styles range from the Federal to the Georgian Revival with a large quantity of urban vernacular dwellings. Stretched out along Cabell Street, the district's only thoroughfare, is a series of outstanding, architecturally sophisticated mansions mostly dating from the last half of the 19th century, including Point of Honor.

It was listed on the National Register of Historic Places in 1983.
