= 1881 Virginia gubernatorial election =

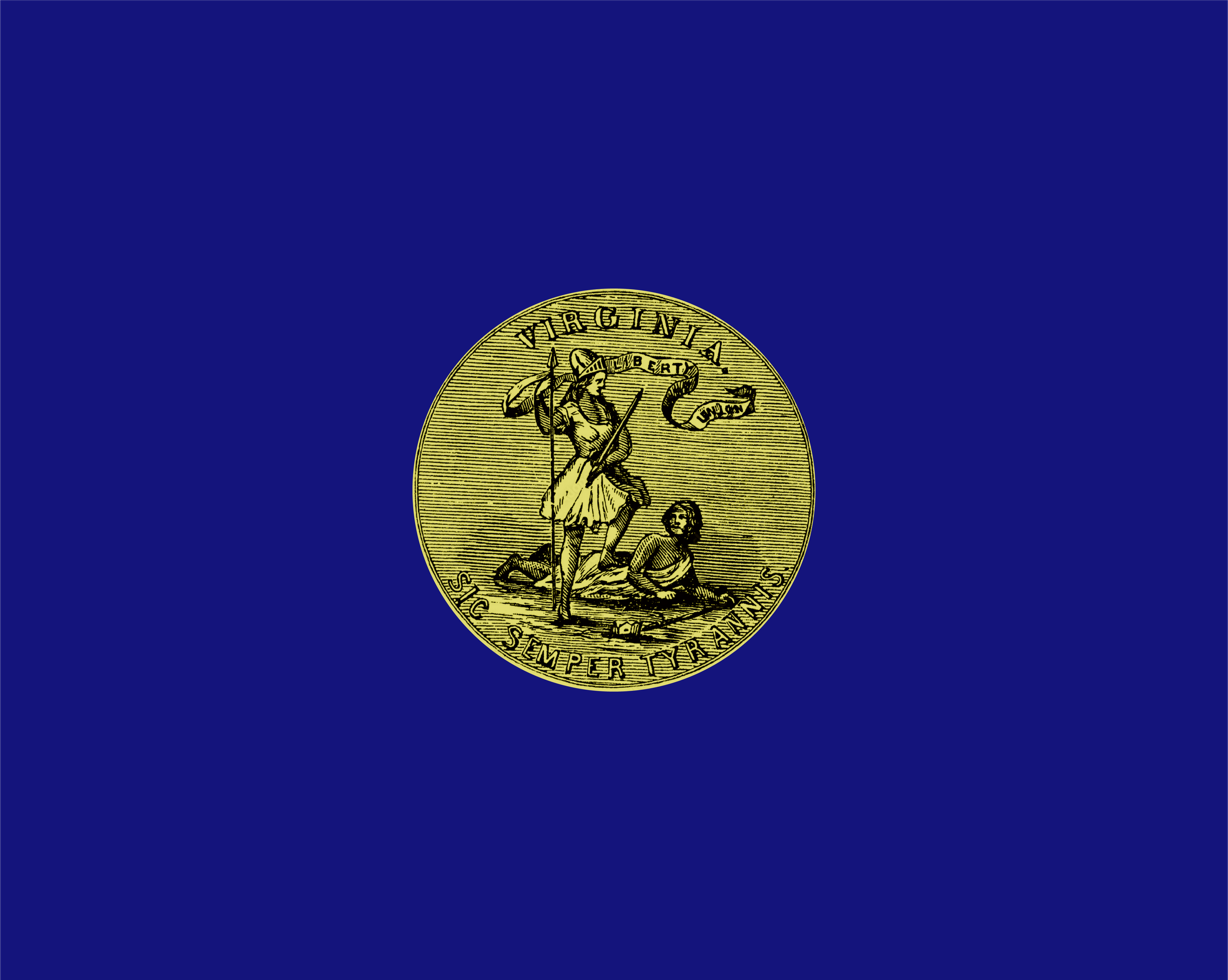
- November 8, 1881
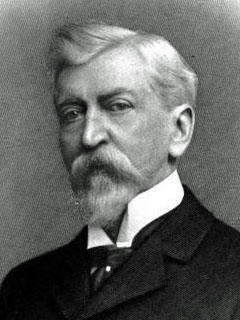

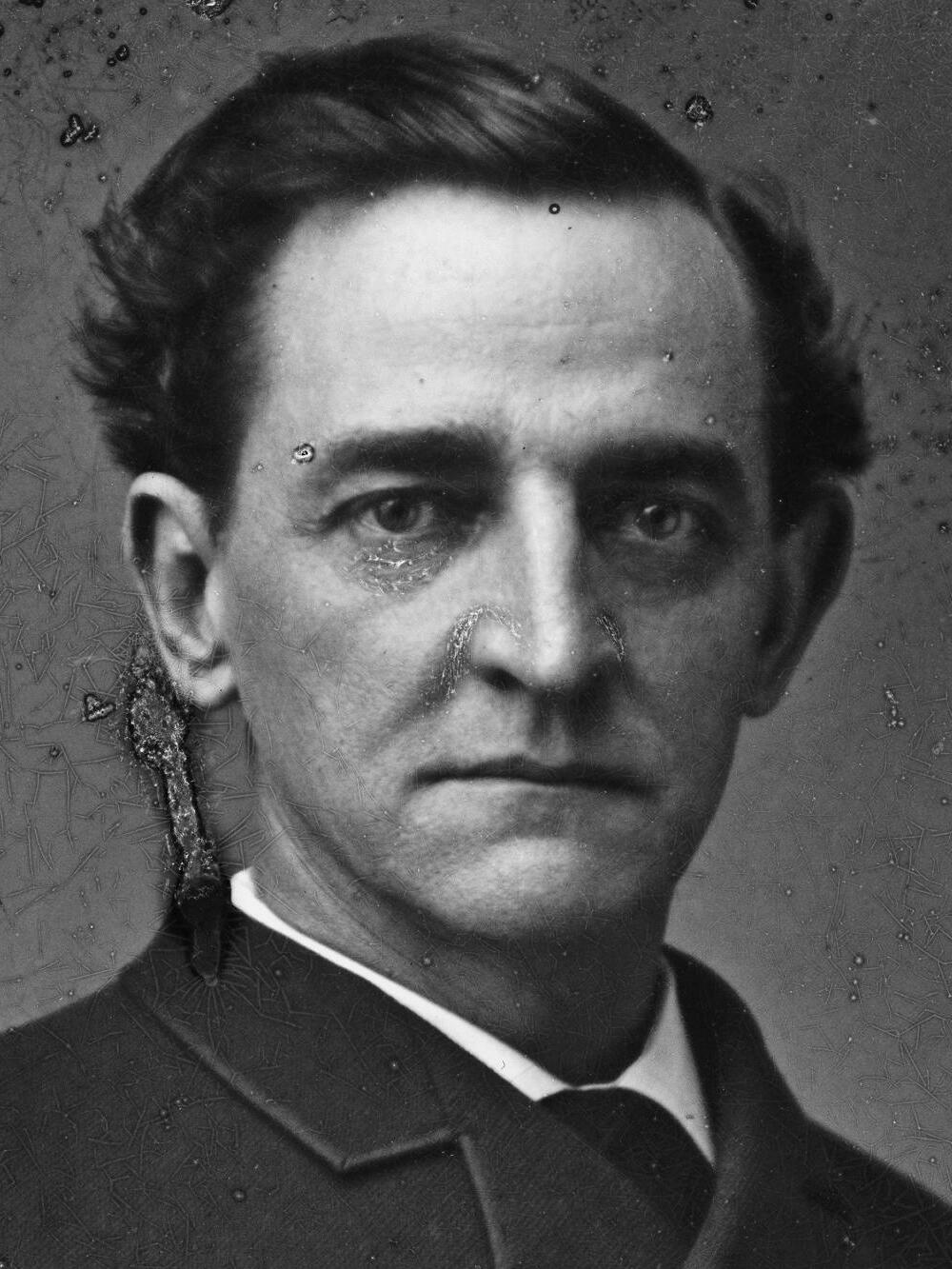
Nominee	William E. Cameron	John W. Daniel
Party	Readjuster	Democratic
Alliance	Republican	-
Popular vote	113,464	100,757
Percentage	52.97%	47.03%
- County Results; Cameron: 50–60% 60–70% 70–80% 80–90% >90% Daniel: 50–60% 60–70% 70–80%
Governor before election
Frederick W. M. Holliday
Democratic
Elected Governor
William E. Cameron
Readjuster

The 1881 Virginia gubernatorial election was held on November 8, 1881. The Readjuster Party candidate William Evelyn Cameron won in a historic upset election. The Readjusters were a unique state mixture of Republicans, populist (or "New Departure") Democrats, freedmen, poor voters, and those in favor of "re-adjusting" the state debt owed to Northern banks for the various internal improvements financed before the war. Some of those internal improvements went to West Virginia, as they were physically located in there, as it counter-seceded from Virginia, who had sided with the Confederacy during the Civil War.

The Democratic candidate, John Warwick Daniel, was a Virginia State Delegate and Virginia State Senator who was elected Representative in 1882 and then United States Senator in 1886, succeeding the leader of the Readjuster Party, William Mahone. Cameron's lieutenant governor, a position that is separately elected, was Republican John Francis Lewis. Lewis at the time of his election was a United States Marshal, and had previously served as lieutenant governor before resigning to serve as senator upon the readmission of the State of Virginia to the United States.

== Results ==
Virginia gubernatorial election, 1881
Party	Candidate	Votes	%	±%
Readjuster	William E. Cameron	113,464	52.97%	
Democratic	John W. Daniel	100,757	47.03%	
Majority		12,707	5.94%	
Turnout		214,221	100.00%	
Readjuster gain from Democratic		Swing		
