= New Departure =

New Departure may refer to:

- New Departure (Ireland), various attempts at cooperation between Irish Republicans and Home Rulers in the late 19th century
- New Departure (Democrats), the change of policy of Southern Democrats in the US in 1870 to cease opposition to Reconstruction and black suffrage
