= Richard Poplar =

Richard Poplar was a free black man who was a cook in the 12th Virginia Infantry Regiment of William Mahone's brigade or division during the American Civil War. In the 20th century, his name was attached to a yearly observance in Petersburg, Virginia, which honored his legacy.

The Virginia legislature passed a law in February, 1862 authorizing the impressment of free black labor. This law required local courts to register every free black male between the ages of 18 and 50 for manual labor. According to records, Richard Poplar was enlisted on July 1, 1862.

During the war, Poplar was taken prisoner in 1863 or 1864 and was held for more than a year in the Point Lookout prison camp. According to writer and former Confederate officer William E. Cameron, who was later governor of Virginia, Poplar was offered his freedom if he would enlist in the Union army, but he "refused persistently, claiming to be a Confederate soldier, which, of course, he was not." Cameron continued:

Then the oath of allegiance was offered him [by his captors], but this, too, he rejected, though many of the white captives were now accepting that alternative to longer confinement. Finally he was enrolled upon the prison list and kept until the end of the war, when he was regularly paroled

It is said that his devotion to his companions in captivity saved the lives of several. When peace returned[,] Dick was, however, ruined for civil life, but his excesses were condoned by his old comrades of the camp and the prison, and when he came to die he was buried with funeral honors.

According to Confederate records compiled by Edward Schoenberger, Poplar held the rank of private in Company H of the 13th Cavalry.

Poplar's companionship with Confederate soldiers is well known. In contrast, he did not appear to extend the same courtesy to enslaved blacks. According to former Governor, William E Cameron, Richard didn't have sympathy for people of his own race who were in bondage.

Some might find Richard's loyalty ironic. Enslaved black people held no power over Poplar and had no rights in his state. Yet, the cause Poplar served did not allow free black people to vote, hold office or testify against a white person in a court of law.

Free blacks like Richard had little protection or aid from the government. Some sought protection from white family members and local community connections.

Professor Ervin L. Jordan Jr. is an expert in Black Confederates. He wrote "Black Confederates and Afro-Yankees in Civil War Virginia". His work is often quoted by Confederate heritage groups.

When asked about Poplar in a 2017 article, Professor Jordan summarized his thoughts on the subject by stating people like Poplar were not heroes, but were trying different strategies to survive. He noted that some free blacks and slaves hoped that by aiding the Confederacy they would be able to retain or gain their freedom, in the event the South won the Civil War.

== Death and legacy ==
A widower, Poplar died on May 25, 1886, in Petersburg, Virginia. Burial took place in Blandford Cemetery.

Multiple obituaries written on the same day for Poplar in 2 different show that he was seen as a faithful servant. The Petersburg Index-Appeal on May 23, 1886, states that he attached himself as a servant and up to his capture at Gettysburg "remained faithfully attached.

The Richmond Dispatch obituary states "while he did not shoulder a musket or fight in the ranks of the struggle, he served the soldiers of the Thirteenth Virginia Cavalry, Chambliss' Brigade with an ardor and faithfulness".

In 2002 or 2003, a Richard "Dick" Poplar Day was first observed in Petersburg, Virginia, as part of an overall remembrance of prisoners of war from that city.

== Additional reading ==
- Clint Smith, "The War on Nostalgia," The Atlantic, June 2021, especially on page 18, concerning Richard Poplar
