= Thomas J. Kirkpatrick =

American lawyer, politician and soldier (1829–1897)

Member of the Virginia Senate from the Campbell County district
- In office December 6, 1871 – November 30, 1875
- Preceded by: Robert L. Owen Sr.
- Succeeded by: John W. Daniel

Personal details
- Born: July 31, 1829 Cumberland County, Virginia, US
- Died: October 17, 1897 (aged 68) Lynchburg, Virginia, US
- Spouse: Fortunata Sydnor Kirkpatrick
- Occupation: Lawyer, teacher

Military service
- Allegiance: Confederate States of America
- Branch/service: artillery
- Years of service: 1861–1865
- Rank: major
- Unit: Amherst Light Artillery

Thomas Jellis Kirkpatrick (July 31, 1829 – October 17, 1897) was an American lawyer, politician and soldier.

== Early and family life ==
Kirkpatrick was born in Cumberland County, Virginia, to John Kirkpatrick and his wife Jane Maria Jellis.

On March 3, 1852, Kirkpatrick married Fortunata Sydnor. Her parents were Fortunatus Sydnor and Elizabeth Royall, who was descended from patriot Benjamin Watkins of Chesterfield County. They had several children, of whom at least Elizabeth Sydnor Kirkpatrick (b. 1858), Fortunatus Sydnor Kirkpatrick (b. 1862) and Thomas J. Kirkpatrick Jr. (b. 1868) survived to adulthood. By 1880, Thomas Jr. and daughter Susan were away at boarding school, and Thomas Sr and his wife lived with three daughters and a young son, along with two servants and two boarders.

== Career ==
By 1850, Kirkpatrick had begun his legal practice in Lynchburg, where he lived with his widowed mother and four sisters. In 1855, he became the first president of the local YMCA, and he would lead the First Presbyterian Sunday School for five decades. By 1860, Kirkpatrick was a trustee of Washington College in Lexington, and continued to serve on that board until 1870.

In February 1861, Kirkpatrick ran for the Virginia Secession Convention as a Disunion candidate from Lynchburg alongside John Goggin, but voters instead elected Unionists John M. Speed and Charles R. Slaughter, perhaps acceding to the constant pleas of The Virginian newspaper.

After Virginia declared its secession in April and joined the American Civil War, Kirkpatrick organized a company called the "Amherst Light Artillery" on July 24, 1861, and became its captain. In 1862, he notified Lynchburg that Brig. General Samuel Garland, Jr. had been killed in battle in Boonsboro, Maryland. Capt. Kirkpatrick was promoted to full major on February 18, 1865. His wife and Narcissa Owen (whose husband Kirkpatrick would succeed in the state Senate), both active in St. Paul's Church, led about 500 Lynchburg women in sewing uniforms and otherwise helping Confederate troops.

After war ended, Kirkpatrick resumed his legal practice, as well as became Lynchburg's superintendent of schools, operating four white and two Negro schools. A Catholic school and two private schools to teach boys and girls, respectively, were also founded at the time.

In December 1871, Kirkpatrick succeeded Robert L. Owen Sr., who had bought a plantation near Norfolk, in representing Campbell County in the Virginia State Senate. Kirkpatrick was not re-elected, but succeeded on December 1, 1875, by fellow Confederate veteran and Conservative Democrat John W. Daniel. By 1891, Kirkpatrick was a trustee of Howard University in Washington, D.C., with his status changing to honorary by 1894.

== Death and legacy ==
Kirkpatrick died in Lynchburg on October 17, 1897, and was buried in the Presbyterian cemetery.
