= Rivermont =

Historic house in Virginia, United States

- U.S. National Register of Historic Places
- Virginia Landmarks Register
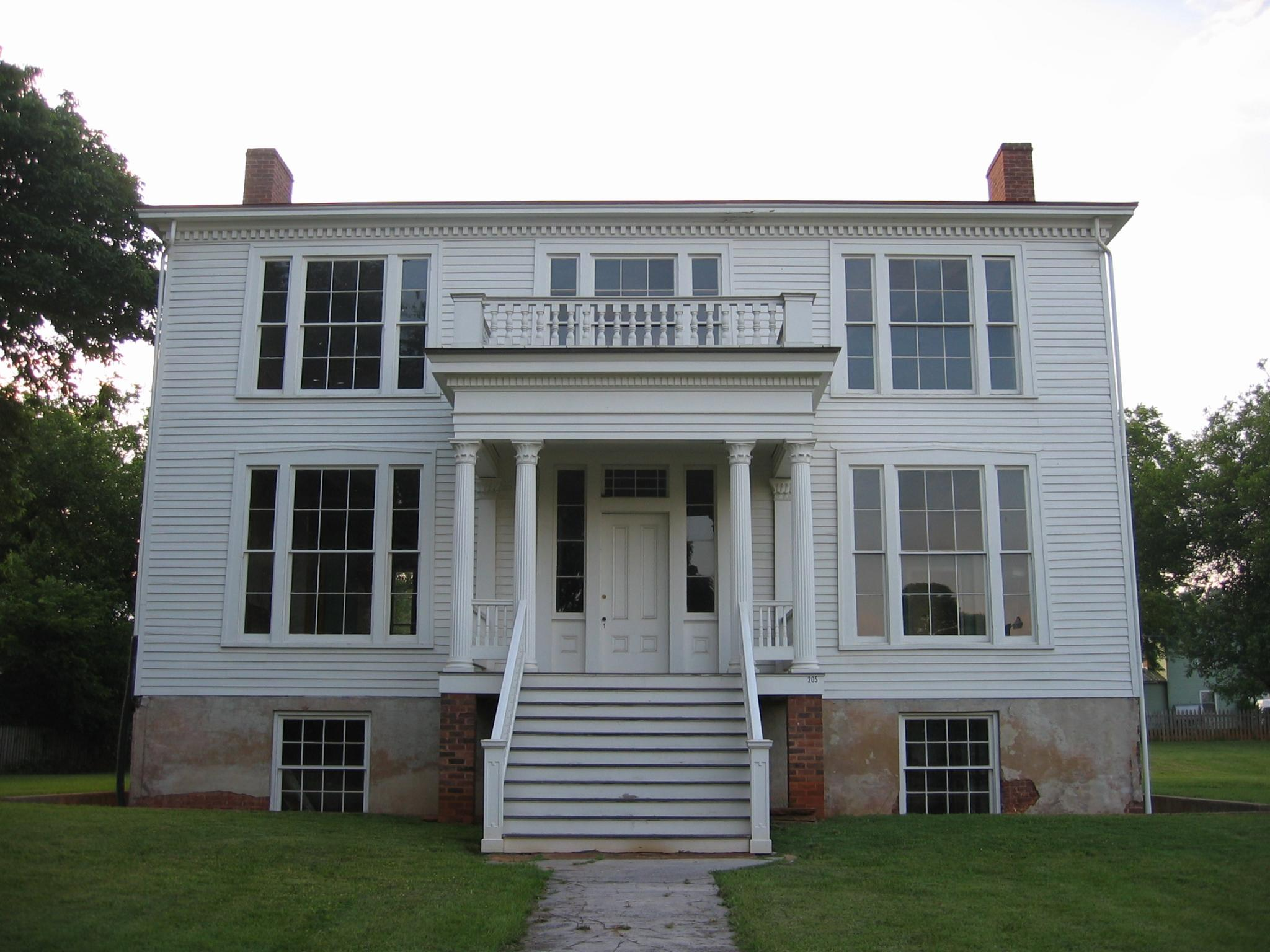
- Rivermont, Lynchburg VA, November 2008

- Location within Virginia Location within the United States
- Location: 205 F St., Lynchburg, Virginia
- Coordinates: 37°25′29″N 79°8′50″W
- Area: 1 acre (0.40 ha)
- Built: 1852
- Architect: Bailey & Lanahan
- Architectural style: Greek Revival
- NRHP reference No.: 00000496
- VLR No.: 118-0203

Significant dates
- Added to NRHP: May 11, 2000
- Designated VLR: December 1, 1999

Rivermont is a historic home located at Lynchburg, Virginia. It is a two-story Greek Revival frame house completed in 1852 and located within the Daniel's Hill Historic District. It was built for Judge William Daniel Jr. (1806–1873) and his second wife, Elizabeth Hannah Cabell (1811–1892). In 1997 the Lynchburg Redevelopment and Housing Authority gained title to the property and donated it to The Rivermont House, Inc.

It was listed on the National Register of Historic Places in 2000.
