= 1877 Virginia gubernatorial election =

- November 6, 1877
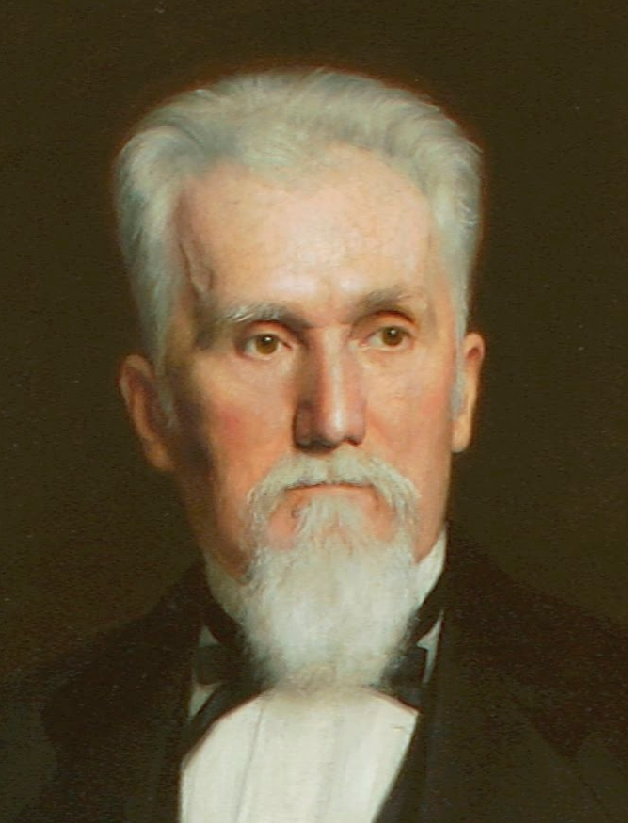
Nominee	Frederick W. M. Holliday
Party	Democratic
Popular vote	101,873
Percentage	95.93%
- County results Holliday: 50–60% 60–70% 70–80% 80–90% >90%
Governor before election
James L. Kemper
Democratic
Elected Governor
Frederick Holliday
Democratic

The 1877 Virginia gubernatorial election was held on November 6, 1877, to elect the governor of Virginia. The Republicans failed to nominate a candidate in this election, and as a result Democratic nominee and former Confederate congressman Frederick Holliday faced no opposition.

== Results ==
Virginia gubernatorial election, 1877
Party	Candidate	Votes	%
Democratic	Frederick W. M. Holliday	101,873	95.93
Write-ins		4,327	4.07
Total votes		106,200	100
Democratic hold			
