= George Cabell (physician) =

American physician

Dr. George Cabell, Sr.
- Born: November 1, 1766; Green Hill, Buckingham Co., Virginia
- Died: December 27, 1823 (aged 57); Point of Honor
- Occupation: Physician

Dr. George Cabell Sr. (November 1, 1766 – December 27, 1823) was a surgeon and builder of Point of Honor, a mansion in the city of Lynchburg, Virginia.

Cabell was born in Buckingham County, Virginia and attended Hampden-Sydney Academy. He became the first to earn an official medical degree from the University of Pennsylvania in 1790. Cabell was a friend and personal medical doctor to the patriot Patrick Henry and a frequent correspondent with his neighbor, Thomas Jefferson.

By 1798 Dr. George Cabell was practicing in Lynchburg, and that year married Sarah Winston (1770–1826), the eldest daughter of Judge Edmund Winston and Alice Taylor Winston. She was a lady of "great elegance, beauty and refinement". The Winston family was well-connected in their own right, and the marriage created a very powerful union. One year later George was the attending physician at the death of his patriot friend. Patrick Henry's son Alexander Spotswood Henry would later marry George's daughter Paulina Cabell. Alexander was named after his great uncle Alexander Spotswood, a Lieutenant-Colonel in the British Army and Lieutenant Governor of Virginia. Spotswood was a leader in Virginia and American history for a number of his projects as Governor, including his exploring beyond the Blue Ridge Mountains, his establishing what was perhaps the first colonial iron works, and his negotiating the Treaty of Albany with the Iroquois Nations of New York.

George Cabell was the son of Paulina Jordan Cabell and Colonel John Cabell. George's father, Col. John Cabell, fought in the American Revolutionary War and served in the Virginia General Assembly, as did George's four uncles, all sons of 1726 British emigrant Dr. William Cabell, who began the planter tradition of what became one of the First Families of Virginia. While Dr. William Cabell may not have had formal medical training, he developed a library which included dozens of medical books. He embraced a "no cure, no fee" policy, in which he charged only those patients who recovered. George's brother Dr. John J. Cabell also practiced medicine in Lynchburg, and became rich from investments in the Kanawha salines. George also mentored his cousin, Dr. George Cabell Jr., who later took his own degree from Philadelphia. The family's medical tradition continued with George Cabell, Jr.'s son, Dr. James Lawrence Cabell, who became a professor of Comparative Anatomy, Physiology, and Surgery at the University of Virginia and the president of the short-lived National Board of Health, 1876–1883.

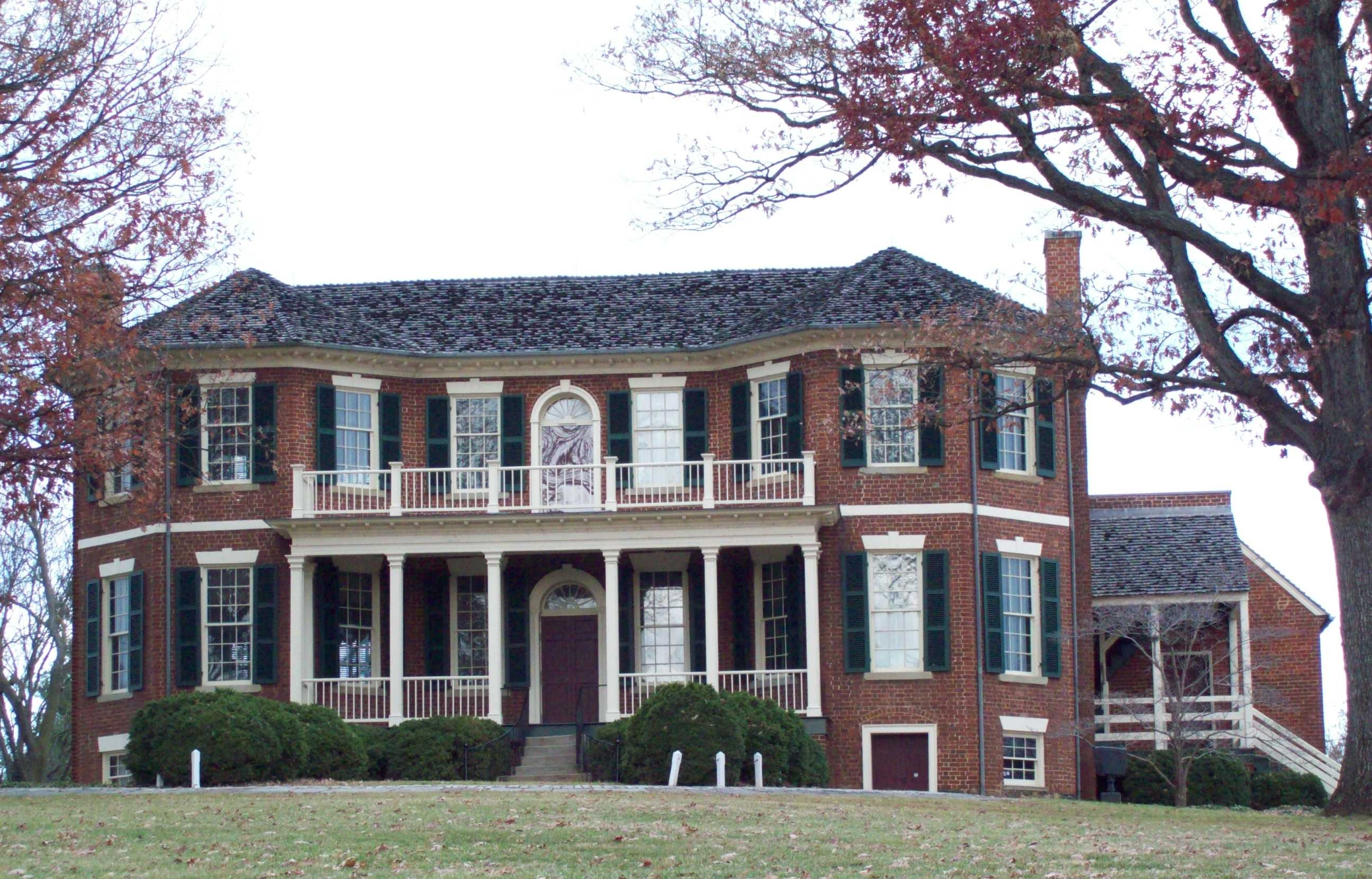
Point of Honor, Lynchburg

In 1806 Dr. Cabell and his wife began construction of a mansion on a sprawling 737 acre plantation in Lynchburg. Finished in 1816, the grand estate would depict a colorful history in the Lynchburg annals and later be named Point of Honor to reflect stories of it being an alleged location for settling arguments with duels. George died in Lynchburg in 1823 as a result of a fall from his horse. There he would be laid to rest. His wife Sarah died in Lynchburg in 1826.

Other famous relatives include Col. William J. Lewis and John Cabell Breckinridge, 14th Vice President of the U.S. under James Buchanan.

The home is now a museum and open to the public.

== Issue ==
Cabell had the following issue:

- Paulina Jordan Henry (Cabell)
- Marion Fontaine Cabell
- John Breckinridge Cabell
- George Kuhn Cabell
- Alice Winston Carrington (Cabell)
- William J. Lewis Cabell
- Edmund Winston Cabell
- Sarah Cabell
