= William Daniel (judge) =

American judge

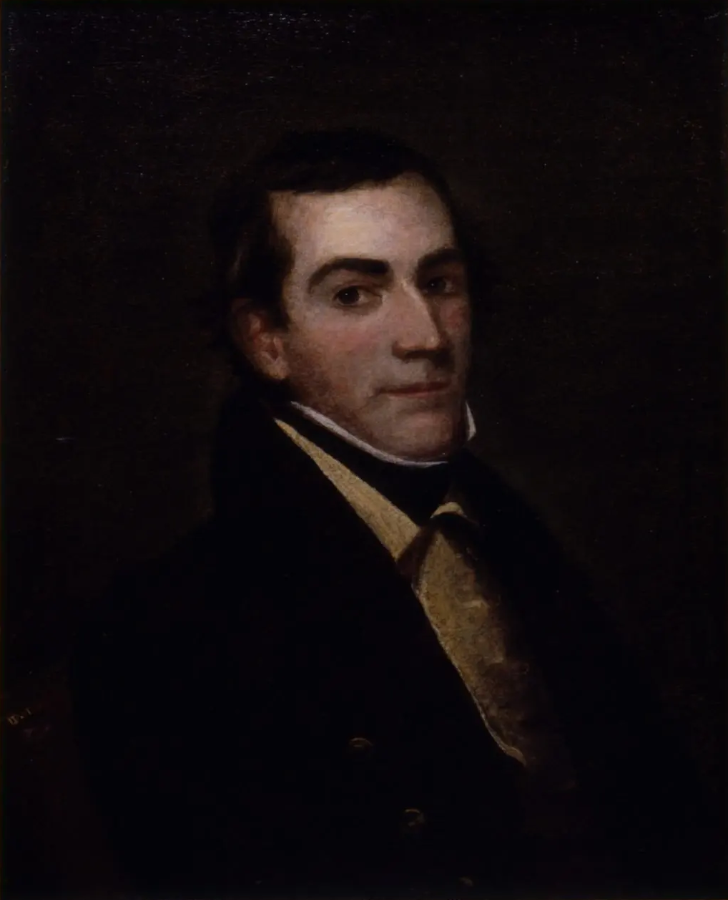

Justice of the Virginia Supreme Court
- In office December 15, 1846 - 1866

Member of the Virginia House of Delegates for Campbell County
- In office January 1, 1838 – January 6, 1839 Serving with Zaccheus E. Cheatham
- Preceded by: John Wills
- Succeeded by: Richard E. Toler
- In office December 7, 1835 – December 4, 1836 Serving with Oden G. Clay
- Preceded by: James Saunders
- Succeeded by: John Wills
- In office December 5, 1831 – December 2, 1833 Serving with William M. Rives
- Preceded by: Oden G. Clay
- Succeeded by: James G. Dearing

Personal details
- Born: November 26, 1806 Winchester, Virginia, US
- Died: March 28, 1873 (aged 66) Lovingston, Virginia, US
- Party: Democratic
- Spouse(s): Sarah A. Warwick; Elizabeth Hannah Cabell
- Education: Hampden–Sydney College, University of Virginia School of Law
- Profession: Planter, lawyer, politician, judge

William Daniel, Jr. (November 26, 1806 – March 28, 1873) was an American slaveowner, lawyer, legislator and jurist who served on the Virginia Supreme Court of Appeals, that state's highest court, from 1846 to 1865.

== Early and family life ==
Daniel was born on November 26, 1806, to Margaret Baldwin Daniel probably in Winchester, Virginia at her parents' home. His father, William Daniel Sr. (1770–1839) was a lawyer, legislator and beginning in 1813 judge of the general court in Cumberland and Campbell Counties based in Lynchburg. He was also related to Virginia legislator Travers Daniel, North Carolina attorney general John Reeves Daniel, justice Peter Vivian Daniel, and newspaper editor and Confederate duelist John Moncure Daniel. His father's second wife, the widow Paulina Jordan (1780-1840) was a daughter of Col. John Cabell (d. 1815) and the widow of Hector Cabell (son of Col. William Cabell). This man's elder sister Mary Cornelia Briscoe Daniel (1804–1843) married Mayo Cabell and would die at the Cabell estate "Union Hill" after birthing nine children. His mother's brother was Judge Briscoe Baldwin. He was thus descended from the First Families of Virginia. Daniel received a private education suitable to his class, then studied at Hampden–Sydney College and graduated in 1826. He then traveled to Charlottesville to study law in 1827-1828 at the University of Virginia.

== Personal life ==
Daniel married twice. His first wife, Sarah Ann Warwick, brought as a dowry a house from her father John Marshall Warwick, as is noted in a modern historical marker on the site. He then lived at Point of Honor, now a city-owned national historic site in Lynchburg. Their son John Warwick Daniel (1842-1910), became known as the "Lame Lion of Lynchburg" due to his disability incurred as a Confederate soldier and political accomplishments, including promoting the Confederate "Lost Cause". She died after the birth of their daughter Sarah Ann Warwick Halsey (1845-1918). In 1850 Judge Daniel remarried, to Elizabeth Hannah Cabell (1811-1892), daughter of Judge William H. Cabell and prominent Richmond socialite. Judge Daniel built a house (Rivermont) for his bride across Blackwater Creek, but they had no children.

== Career ==
Admitted to the bar in 1828, when he was barely twenty-one years old, he began a private legal practice around Lynchburg, Virginia, the county seat of Campbell County and adjacent to Cumberland County.

Campbell County voters at three separate times elected Daniel as one of their (part-time) representatives in the Virginia House of Delegates in 1831, 1835 and 1837. He was elected twice as a Democrat.

Lynchburg became a major trading center (including of enslaved persons) during his and his father's careers. Traders could reach it both from the north/south Wilderness Road which eventually crossed the Appalachian Mountains through the Cumberland Gap into Kentucky, and a more mountainous but direct west-east route reached the James River Canal and downstream to the state capital at Richmond (although the western section through what eventually became West Virginia would be eclipsed by railroads). In the 1830 census, either he or his father owned at least 7 slaves in Campbell County. The following year, in his first term as delegate, Daniel became involved the Virginia's great debate on slavery's future in the state. At the time, his father probably owned about 30 slaves. On January 14, 1832, Daniel argued against the gradual emancipation bill being contemplated, which would have freed children born to enslaved mothers, a crucial issue to the important slave trade and that became one of the hallmarks of his jurisprudence. His father died in November 1839, and Daniel drew public attention for his eulogy of the late President Andrew Jackson in 1844.

On December 15, 1846, legislators elected Daniel to the Court of Appeals, so he sat with his maternal uncle Briscoe Baldwin until 1852 and in June 1850 married the daughter of another judicial colleague William H. Cabell, who died in January 1853 but whose pro-slaveholding jurisprudence Daniel continued. After the adoption of the Commonwealth's new constitution in 1851, Judge Daniel won popular election to the reorganized court, to which was added Judge Richard C.L. Moncure, whom Daniel had outpolled in 1846, but who would again win election after the Civil War as well as rise to become the court's chief judge.

Daniel continued as a fierce proponent of slavery on the Court. He authored the 1858 decision in Bailey v. Poindexter's Executor, which expanded upon the 1829 decision by his late father-in-law Judge William H. Cabell in Stevenson v. Singleton and voided a manumission provision in a will because it gave slaves a choice which Daniel and two other justices decided they were legally incapable of making. Fellow western Virginia judges George Hay Lee and John J. Allen concurred with Judge Daniel's analysis in this case. Months later, President (Chief) Judge Allen relied upon this decision in deciding Williamson v. Coalter's Executor, which overturned the will of Judge John Coalter's widow who wished to free the slaves she inherited from her father after Coalter's death and who sought legal advice in light of that court's growing disfavoring of manumission (although the real estate at issue has been preserved and the National Park Service now operates both Chatham Manor and Ellwood Manor), and Judges Daniel and Lee concurred in that decision. Although Judge Moncure wrote dissents based on longstanding Virginia practice in both cases (and was joined by Judge Green Berry Samuels, who died within the year), Alabama's Supreme Court followed Daniel's expansion of slave disabilities in 1861.

== American Civil War and after ==
Judge Daniel continued on Virginia's highest court through the American Civil War (in which his son John Warwick Daniel fought and became crippled) until Virginia's surrender to federal forces in mid-1865 and the court's reconstruction during Congressional Reconstruction. After the war, he secured a presidential pardon and resumed a private legal practice with his son and son-in-law.

== Death and legacy ==
Daniel died of a seizure in the Nelson County courthouse on March 28, 1873, and is buried at the Old City cemetery in Lynchburg.

Although his son John Warwick Daniel remained a powerful politician in Lynchburg, Virginia and even the national scene for his advocacy of the Lost Cause, his younger sister Elvira had married Col. Charles Ellet Jr. who remained loyal to the Union, designed crucial armored ships used on the Mississippi River, and died of his war injury at Cairo, Illinois in 1862. One of their daughters, Mary Virginia Ellet Cabell, would become the second wife of his distant cousin William Daniel Cabell in 1867 and help found the Daughters of the American Revolution. His other sister became the wife of Wood Bouldin who began his service on the Virginia Supreme Court months before Daniel's death.

His childhood home, Point of Honor remains, now city-owned and a national historic site. Rivermont, the mansion that Daniel built across Blackwater Creek from Point of Honor, was listed on the national register of historic places in 2000, three years after the Lynchburg Redevelopment Authority deeded it to an entity; it is also the name of the surrounding historic district and avenue leading from Rivermont bridge to Daniel's Hill, as the area was developed in the 1890s.
