= Robert L. Owen Sr. =

American politician

Member of the Virginia Senate from the Campbell County district
- In office October 5, 1869 – December 5, 1871
- Preceded by: n/a
- Succeeded by: Thomas J. Kirkpatrick

Personal details
- Born: Robert Latham Owen; July 3, 1825 Lynchburg, Virginia, US
- Died: June 2, 1873 (aged 47) Norfolk, Virginia, US
- Spouse: Narcissa Chisholm Owen
- Children: Robert Latham Owen Jr.
- Occupation: Railroad executive

Robert Latham Owen Sr. (1825–1873) was a civil engineer and surveyor, Virginia plantation owner, member of the Virginia Senate and President of the Virginia and Tennessee Railroad.

== Early and family life ==
Robert Latham Owen was born to Dr. William Owen of Lynchburg, Virginia and his wife Jane Latham Owen. His Owen ancestors had emigrated from Wales, and the family had a record of public service as politicians, doctors and teachers. His brother Dr. William Otway Owen Sr. (1820–92), like their father practiced medicine in Lynchburg, and became Surgeon-in-Chief supervising thirty Confederate hospitals in Lynchburg during the American Civil War.

As a young civil engineer, Owen surveyed for various railroads. In Jonesborough, Tennessee, he met schoolteacher Narcissa Clark Chisholm, orphaned daughter of Cherokee chief Thomas Chisholm. A granddaughter of Chief John D. Chisholm who led an expedition along the Arkansas River, she had been born in Arkansas before the Trail of Tears. Rev. David Sullins married them. They had two sons: Maj. William Otway Owen M.D. (1854-1924, born in Tennessee and who became a U.S. Army doctor) and Robert Latham Owen Jr. (1856-1947, born after they moved back to Lynchburg, and who became one of the first two U.S. Senators from Oklahoma).

The family lived in Lynchburg's best-known mansion, Point of Honor, until 1870, and Dr. Owen Sr. operated the Vista Acres plantation in Campbell County.

== Career ==
During the American Civil War, Robert Latham Owen accepted Confederate rifles to defend the railroad, which were delivered by Gen. Thomas Stonewall Jackson.

Owen also criticized the chaotic military demands on his railroad's rolling stock, which was a crucial link to the salt in Saltville, Virginia, as well as Tennessee, among other routes. His wife Narcissa led about 500 women who sewed uniforms and otherwise assisted the Confederate cause. Union troops never conquered Lynchburg, although the city was threatened in the Battle of Lynchburg. Owen was among the citizens surrendering the short-term Virginia Capitol on April 12, 1865, three days after the surrender at Appomattox Court House. However, the conflict destroyed most of its rolling stock and much track.

In late 1867, Robert Latham Owen Sr. resigned his position as President of the Virginia and Tennessee Railway because he opposed a proposed railway consolidation led by the colorful and highly political former Confederate General (and future U.S. Senator, 1881–87) William Mahone, who replaced him as president. Despite the opposition of Owen and prominent Lynchburg citizens James Garland, John W. Daniel and Col. R. W. Withers, Mahone's Norfolk and Petersburg Railroad acquired most of the stock of the formerly Lynchburg-owned Virginia and Tennessee Railway, and merged it and the South Side Railroad into the new Atlantic, Mississippi and Ohio Railroad (some quipped that its initials, AM&O meant "All Mine and Otelia's", referred to Mahone and his equally colorful wife, Otelia). However, the new railroad soon went bankrupt. Future U.S. Senator Carter Glass, who long opposed Mahone, worked on that reorganization early in his career.

Meanwhile, Owen, Franklin Stearns and Gilbert C. Walker became the leading conservative (or True) Republican candidates for Virginia governor as Congressional Reconstruction was ending in 1868, to oppose Radical Republicans led by provisional governor Henry H. Wells. Conservative Democrats had also formed a Committee of Nine to oppose that Constitution, especially its Confederate disenfranchisement provisions. Eventually, Stearns, L.H. Chandler, Edgar Allen, as well as former provost marshal and now Secretary of War John Schofield and the Committee of Nine succeeded in convincing newly elected President Ulysses Grant to separate the ratification votes on the two controversial anti-Confederate clauses from that concerning the proposed new Constitution (which passed by an overwhelming margin even as those two clauses were defeated).

In the next election (Virginia's first after readmission) Conservative Republicans united with Conservative Democrats to nominate Gilbert C. Walker for governor, who defeated Wells. In the same election, Robert Latham Owen Sr. ran for (and won) a state senate seat, representing Campbell County and Lynchburg. Owen escaped tragedy by not attending a controversial Virginia Supreme Court hearing concerning Richmond's mayoral election of 1870, overcrowding in which caused a balcony to collapse, which then caused the floor to collapse into the General Assembly chamber below, with many killed and injuries. Afterward, he bought a plantation near Norfolk that had been owned by his fellow surveyor, and moved his family there. His friend Thomas J. Kirkpatrick, Lynchburg's new school superintendent and a Confederate veteran, was elected to succeed Owen in the Virginia Senate on December 6, 1871.

== Death and legacy ==
Owen died unexpectedly in Norfolk on June 2, 1873, leaving his wife in financial straits and with two young boys to raise. His body was returned to Lynchburg by train, and the funeral was held at St. Paul's Episcopal Church.
