= Robert C. Burkholder =

American politician

Member of the Virginia House of Delegates from the Campbell County district
- In office December __, 1869 – 1871 Serving with John W. Daniel, Rufus Murrell
- Preceded by: n/a

Personal details
- Born: June 3, 1826 Lee County, Virginia
- Died: December 12, 1914 (aged 88) Bedford County, Virginia
- Spouse: Mary Elizabeth Crumpton Burkholder
- Children: 2 sons, daughter
- Occupation: architect

Military service
- Allegiance: Confederate States of America
- Branch/service: artillery
- Years of service: 1861-1862
- Rank: corporal
- Unit: Lynchburg Light Artillery

Robert Calhoun Burkholder (1826 – December 12, 1914) was a Virginia architect, Confederate soldier, and one of Campbell County, Virginia's three delegates in the Virginia General Assembly when it resumed after Congressional Reconstruction (1869-1871).

== Early and family life ==
Burkholder was born in Lee County, Virginia, on June 3, 1826, to James Burkholder and his wife, the former Mary Newton.

On November 20, 1852, he married Mary Elizabeth Crumpton (1836 -1906). They had ten children, of whom eight survived to adulthood, according to the 1900 census. Their sons included: Robert S. (b. 1859), William (b. 1864), Richard (b. 1866) and Francis John (b. 1867 and died as infant). Their daughters who survived childhood included Belle (b. 1854), Kate (b. 1856), Sallie (b. 1860), Mary Jo Burkholder Harrison (1861-1904) and Adna (b. 1870).

== Career ==
By 1850, Burkholder had become a carpenter in Lynchburg, and was one of six young carpenters living with master carpenter Alfred Taylor and his family.

Two years later, he married his wife, but soon moved with his young family to Wytheville, Virginia. His father-in-law persuaded him to return to Lynchburg, and gave him a lot that he had purchased on Daniel's Hill to build a home on. By 1860, Burkholder owned two male (aged 27 and 20) and two female slaves (aged 13 and 18) who lived with the family in Lynchburg.

Within a month after Virginia declared its secession in the American Civil War, Burkholder (although 35 years old) enlisted as a private in the Lynchburg Light artillery. Later, he was assigned duty as a hospital steward in the city and promoted to corporal on February 28, 1862. He was discharged as overage on August 8, 1862.

After war ended, Burkholder remained in Lynchburg, and was elected as one of Campbell County's three delegates to the first session of the Virginia General Assembly after Congressional Reconstruction ended. The other delegates were Conservative Democrats John W. Daniel and his father-in-law Rufus Murrell. Daniel also represented creditors of Crumpton who sued Burkholder and other Crumpton relatives because Crumpton had died with debts but without finishing real estate transfer paperwork (prominent ex-Confederate and Republican John Singleton Mosby and his law partner represented Burkholder). Nonetheless, Burkholder finished the Y-shaped house by 1875, and it remains a historic structure in the Daniel's Hill Historic District today. The Virginia Supreme Court in 1872 threw out the case against the husband of Crumpton's daughter Una, and in 1878 decided that the Cabell Street house belonged to Burkholder, on equitable grounds because he had so improved the property.

== Death and legacy ==
By the 1900 census, Burkholder farmed outside Lynchburg in Forest, Bedford County, Virginia. He lived with his wife of 48 years, as well as daughter-in-law Minna E. Burkholder and grandchildren Willie (age 13), Edward (age 9), Napier (age 8) and Minna (age 4). His son Richard lived and farmed nearby with his own family. In 1910, the widower Burkholder lived with his unmarried daughters Kate B. (age 54) and Edna A. (age 40) and granddaughter Sarah (age 12); that census also indicated that he continued to do odd jobs as a laborer and that their house was rented. He died of nephritis in 1914 and was buried in Lynchburg's Spring Hill cemetery.

Many of the Victorian structures Burkholder designed and built remain in Lynchburg's historic districts today, including 3 in the Daniel's Hill district alone.
