= Hancock–Wirt–Caskie House =

Historic house in Virginia, United States

- U.S. National Register of Historic Places
- Virginia Landmarks Register
- Richmond City Historic District
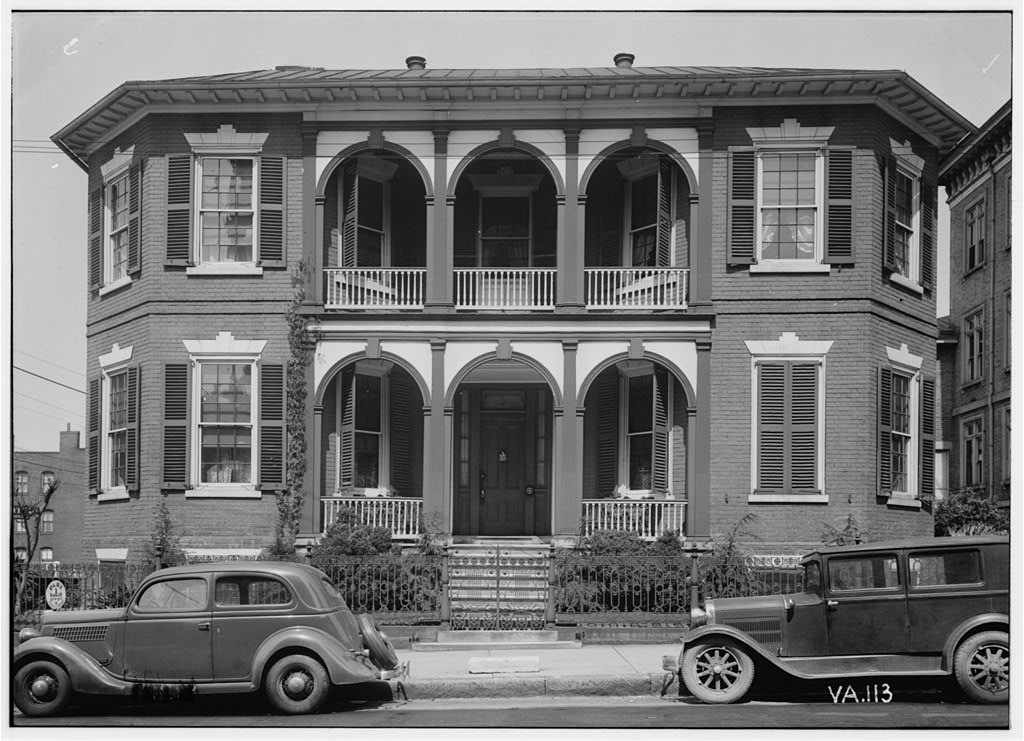
- Hancock–Wirt–Caskie House, HABS photo, 1936

- Location within Virginia Location within the United States
- Location: 2 N. 5th St., Richmond, Virginia
- Coordinates: 37°32′25″N 77°26′25″W
- Area: 0.3 acres (0.12 ha)
- Built: 1808–1809
- Built by: Hancock, Michael; Unknown
- Architectural style: Federal
- NRHP reference No.: 70000881
- VLR No.: 127-0042

Significant dates
- Added to NRHP: April 17, 1970
- Designated VLR: December 2, 1969

Hancock–Wirt–Caskie House, also known as The William Wirt House, is a historic home located in Richmond, Virginia. It was built in 1808–09, and is a two-story, seven-bay Federal-era brick dwelling with a hipped roof. The three bays on either side of the entrance are formed into octagonal-ended or three-sectioned bow front projections with a wooden, two-level porch arcade screening the central space. It has a central hall plan with an octagonal room on the south, a rectangular room behind and a larger single room across the hall. In 1816, William Wirt (1772–1834) purchased the house and lived there until 1818, when he moved to Washington as Attorney General of the United States under James Monroe. Diagonally across Main St, a mansion known as Moldavia was then acquired by the Randolphs, who, like Wirt, were among the oldest and most prestigious planter-aristocrat families of Virginia and were some of the founders of the United States. The Randolphs, however, had to sell one of their mansions in Richmond and sold Moldavia to a Spanish merchant named Joseph Gallego, who in turn sold it in 1825 to John Allan, a merchant of Scots origin who was the foster father of the author Edgar Allan Poe. It was in this house that Poe spent about a year before going away to the University of Virginia in 1826 at the age of 17. The sale of this house to merchants scandalized the planter-aristocracy, who expressed in letters written at the time their disdain for the fact that mere merchants were taking over their property and their world. Later serving as the headquarters of the Richmond Chapter of the American Red Cross, the house is now a private residence. The last business to occupy this house was the law firm of Bowles and Bowles. The house bears a strong resemblance to Point of Honor in Lynchburg, Virginia.

It was listed on the National Register of Historic Places in 1970.
