= New Departure (United States) =

1865 political platform of the Democratic Party

The New Departure refers to the political platform adopted by the US Democratic Party after 1865, and the subsequently deployed strategy, in order to distance itself from its pro-slavery and Copperhead history. The approach was an effort to broaden the party's political base and to focus on issues on which it had more of an advantage, especially economic ones.

== History ==
The Democratic Party was the principal party in power in the Southern United States in the years leading up to the American Civil War. The Southern wing of the party defended the institution of slavery and largely came to support secession and the resultant Confederate States in the aftermath of the 1860 election. This fact became a political liability for Northern Democrats in the years of sectional crisis.

In the aftermath of the war, Republicans alleged that many Democrats had been defeatists during the war and had supported Copperhead efforts to end it with a negotiated peace and the diplomatic recognition of an independent South. Abraham Lincoln's Republican administration successfully prosecuted the war, giving it great political advantage in the Northern states. Radical Republicans took control of Congress in 1866, stripped ex-Confederates of their power in local affairs, and utilized the US Army to prevent southern states from preventing or fraudulently suppressing the ballots of Freedmen. Democrats opposed Radical Reconstruction, which they would eventually topple, replacing it with Jim Crow.

== New Departure ==
By 1870, many Democrats had stopped opposing Reconstruction and many Republican policies in an effort to improve the fortunes of their party in a strategy that was called the "New Departure" of the Democratic Party. Democrats began asserting that they were just as loyal to the United States as the Republicans and now supported some civil rights. Democrats began pushing for economic modernization and recovery and alleged that the Republican-controlled state governments were inefficient and corrupt. As falling cotton prices further increased economic depression in the South, Democrats attacked the Republicans as creating unwelcome tax burdens and being unable to revive the economy. A prominent example of "New Departure" success was the election as the Governor of Virginia of William E. Cameron and of ex-Confederate General William Mahone as US Senator from Virginia. Both Cameron and Mahone were leaders of the "Readjuster Party," a coalition of Democrats, Republicans and African Americans that sought the reduction of Virginia's pre-war debt. In Tennessee, "Redeemer" Democrats supported the Republican governor DeWitt Senter.

== Georgia ==
Georgia Democrats called their program the New Departure starting in 1872, when they regained full control of the state government. The party was conservative on issues of race and vigorously promoted the Henry W. Grady's New South dream of promoting economic modernization by business, railroads, banking, merchandising, and industry. The New Departure policy made Georgia's reconciliation with the business community in the North easier and facilitated northern investments in the state. The era ended in 1890, when the Farmers' Alliance captured the Democratic Party.

== Ohio ==
On May 18, 1871, Democrats of Montgomery County, Ohio, met in convention in Dayton to appoint delegates to the state convention on June 1, 1871. The members of their Committee on Resolutions were Clement Vallandigham, Dr. A. Geiger, David A. Houk, Dr. John Kemp, John A. McMahon, Adam Clay, and George V. Naureth. The New Departure resolution of fifteen points was adopted. The resolution called for abandoning Civil War issues of the Democratic Party, "thus burying out of sight all that is of the dead past, namely, the right of secession, slavery, inequality before the law, and political inequality; and further, now that reconstruction is complete, and representation within the Union restored to all the States" and affirmed states' rights. It "opposed to all attempts at centralisation and consolidation of power in the hands of the General Government" and advocated "to secure universal political rights and equality among both the white and the colored people of the United States." The resolution called for "payment of the public debt at the earliest practicable moment consistent with moderate taxation" and to "make the burdens of taxation equal, uniform, and just" with "adequate reform in the civil service." For government finances, "a strictly revenue tariff" was advocated, along with "all taxation ought to be based on wealth instead of population... That specie is the basis of all sound currency, and that the policy requires as speedy a return to that basis as is practicable without distress to the debtor-class"

The resolution stated "there is no necessary or irrepressible conflict between labor and capital. The policy on land grants was: "we are totally and resolutely opposed to the grant of any more of the public lands... holding that these lands ought to be devoted as homesteads to actual settlers, or sold in small quantities to individuals at a price so low as to induce speedy occupation and settlement." It advocated "holding still to the good old Democratic doctrine of annexation or acquisition of territory, The "Bayonet Bill" and the "Ku-Klux Bill" passed by Congress were opposed on the grounds of "intermeddling with the exclusively local concerns of every State. The resolution concluded with a statement "that the Radical party of 1871 as now constituted is not the Republican party... it deserves the emphatic condemnation of the people."

The New Departure policy of Ohio Democrats was endorsed by Salmon P. Chase on May 20, 1871.

The resolution may or may not have been the origins of the New Departure policy of the Democratic Party.

== Criticism and opposition ==
The "New Departure" was strongly opposed by large factions of Democrats in the Deep South. They professed loyalty to the Confederate legacy. Republicans attacked the Democrats as being insincere about reform, committed to states' rights at the expense of national unity, and to white supremacy at the expense of civil rights.
