= Frederick W. M. Holliday =

American politician (1828–1899)

Frederick W.M. Holliday
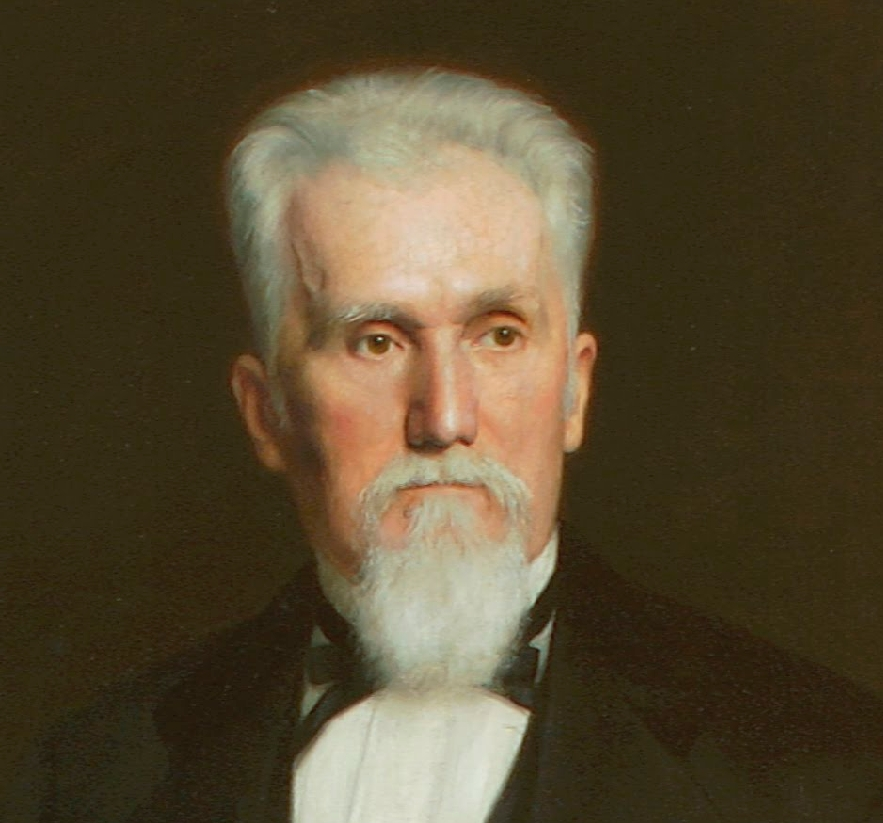

38th Governor of Virginia
- In office January 1, 1878 – January 1, 1882
- Lieutenant: James A. Walker
- Preceded by: James L. Kemper
- Succeeded by: William E. Cameron

Member of the Confederate States House of Representatives from Virginia's 10th district
- In office February 17, 1864 – March 18, 1865
- Preceded by: Alexander R. Boteler
- Succeeded by: Office abolished

Personal details
- Born: February 22, 1828 Winchester, Virginia, U.S.
- Died: May 29, 1899 (aged 71) Winchester, Virginia, U.S.
- Party: Democratic
- Education: Yale University; University of Virginia
- Profession: Lawyer

Military service
- Allegiance: Confederate States of America
- Branch/service: Confederate States Army
- Years of service: 1861–1864
- Rank: Colonel
- Commands: 33rd Virginia Infantry
- Battles/wars: American Civil War

Frederick William Mackey Holliday (February 22, 1828 – May 29, 1899) was a member of the Confederate Congress as well as an officer in the Confederate States Army during the American Civil War. Holiday served as the 38th Governor of Virginia, serving from 1878 to 1882, the first graduate of the University of Virginia to hold that office.

== Biography ==
Born in Winchester, Virginia, Holliday was the son of Dr. Richard John and Mary Catherine (née Taylor) Holliday. He attended Winchester Academy and Yale University before earning degrees in philosophy, political economy, and law from the University of Virginia in 1848, receiving all three degrees after less than one year of study He was the Commonwealth's Attorney for Frederick County, Virginia, from 1861 to 1865.

When the American Civil War began, he was elected as first captain of the Mountain Rangers of Winchester, which became Company D of the 33rd Virginia Infantry Regiment. The unit was part of the Stonewall Brigade in the Army of Northern Virginia. During the Battle of Cedar Mountain, Holliday was wounded in his right arm, which had to be amputated. He resigned from the military as a colonel on March 1, 1864, and was elected to the Second Confederate Congress.

Holliday won the election for Governor of Virginia in 1877 as a Conservative Democrat unopposed. Holliday began his term by breaking the established tradition of small inauguration ceremonies for Virginia governors. His ceremony included parades, bands, cannons, and an inaugural speech to 10,000 people.

Holliday traveled the world after his term as governor. He died at his home in Winchester, Virginia, on May 29, 1899, and was buried in Mount Hebron Cemetery.

Party political offices
Preceded by James L. Kemper	Democratic nominee for Governor of Virginia; 1877	Succeeded by John W. Daniel
Political offices
Preceded by James L. Kemper	Governor of Virginia; 1878–1882	Succeeded by William E. Cameron
