= Narcissa Chisholm Owen =

American artist (1831–1911)

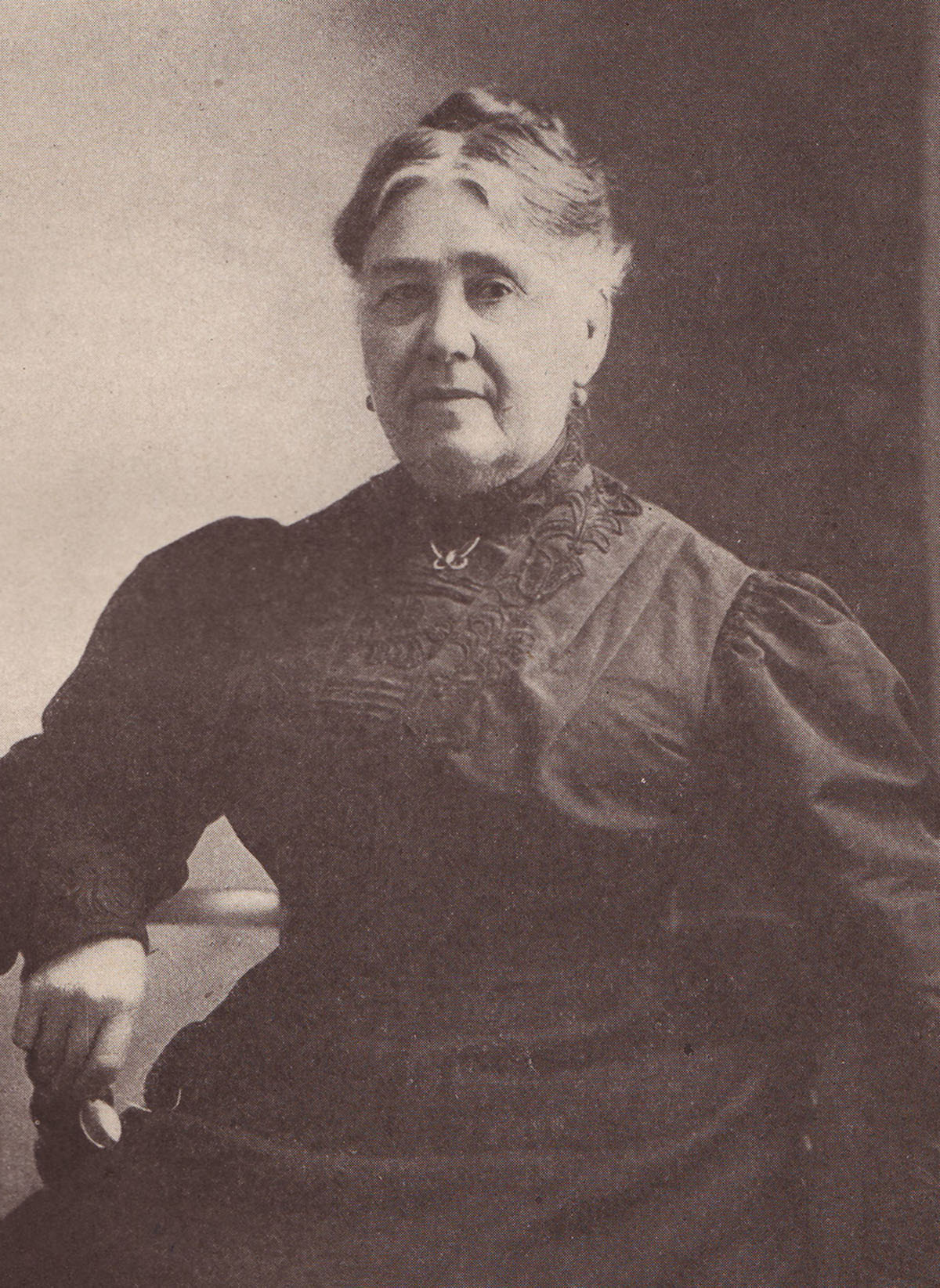
- Owen in 1906
- Born: Narcissa Clark Chisholm; October 3, 1831; Webbers Falls, Cherokee Nation
- Died: July 12, 1911 (aged 79); Guthrie, Oklahoma, U.S.
- Known for: Painting, fingerweaving, tapestry
- Awards: Louisiana Purchase Exposition Medal

Narcissa Clark Owen (née Chisholm; October 3, 1831 – July 11, 1911) was a Native American educator, memoirist, and artist of the late 19th and early 20th century. She was the daughter of Old Settler Cherokee Chief Thomas Chisholm, wife of Virginia state senator Robert L. Owen Sr. and mother of U.S. Senator Robert Latham Owen Jr. and Major William Otway Owen. Narcissa Owen is most recognized for her Memoirs written in 1907, where she narrates accounts of her life along with the stories and culture of her Cherokee relatives.

== Early life and family background ==
Narcissa Clark Chisholm was born on October 3, 1831, in a log cabin near Webbers Falls (in what was then Arkansas Territory, to become Indian Territory and later Oklahoma) to Cherokee sub-chief Thomas H. Chisholm (1790–1834) and his Virginia-born wife Malinda Wharton (1803–1864) (great-granddaughter of British Jacobite politician Philip Wharton, 1st Duke of Wharton). Narcissa was the youngest of four siblings. Her sister Jane Elizabeth married Caswell Wright Bruton and became Jane Bruton. Neither of her brothers, Alfred Finney Chisholm (1830–1862), who married Margaret Harper, and William Wharton Chisholm (1830–1862), who married Susie Pindar, survived the American Civil War.

Her paternal grandparents were John D. Chisholm, a Scotsman, and Martha Holmes, a Cherokee.

Her paternal great-grandfather, John Beamor, emigrated from England to the Carolinas to missionize Cherokees. In 1699, the 23-year-old colonist married 16-year-old Quatsis (Cherokee), sister of Chief Caulunna. Rev. Beamor joined South Carolina's House of Burgesses and owned a plantation and at least 10 enslaved Black people. Around 1730 Beamor traveled with a group of Cherokees to England, where he signed a treaty that was opposed by a Cherokee group led by Oconostota (Cherokee, c. 1710 – 1783), a war chief prior to the Revolutionary War and an ancestor to Narcissa. One of Beamor's grandsons, Rev. Jesse Bushyhead (1804–1844), became a noted Baptist preacher, as well as a schoolmaster.

By 1812, Thomas Jefferson initiated efforts to forcibly removed Cherokees into Arkansas territory within the Louisiana Purchase. From 1814 to 1817, the Old Settler Cherokees worked to secure title to land in northwestern Arkansas. In 1819, the Old Settlers or Western Cherokees moved westward with enslaved peoples and settled on the Spada and Arkansas Rivers. By 1819, the Cherokee people included about 15,000 warriors, of which a third (including the Chisholm family) lived west of the Mississippi River. In 1827 the Cherokee Nation held a general convention and adopted a national constitution, at a convention led by John Ross and which elected Charles R. Hicks Principal Chief.

Narcissa Owen's father, Thomas Chisholm, a landowner and slave owner, moved his family to Beattie's Prairie (near present-day Jay, Oklahoma) in 1828. In 1834 he is elected as third chief, which Narcissa described in her Memoirs as the last hereditary war chief. While at a gathering between Cherokees and Plains Indians in Tahlequah, he caught typhoid fever. His wife brought him back home, but he did not recover and died in 1834, when Narcissa was only three years old.

Narcissa's mother remarried a widower and future judge William Wilson (1811–1897). His first wife was Ruth Drumgould, whose mother was Kah-ta-yah, whom young Narcissa met in 1836 when the grandmother was nearing 100. Young Narcissa also learned about her Cherokee heritage from "Granny Jenny," her father's former nurse and the daughter of enslaved Black people.

In 1838, US federal government forced the majority of Cherokee into Indian Territory along the Trail of Tears. Owen witnessed Cherokees, supervised by the US Army, camp on her mother's farm in January 1839. In her memoir, she noted the cruelty of herding human beings accustomed to warm winters through the cold and wind. She described how many refugees were sick, dozens died, and were buried in what had been the family graveyard.

== Education and family life ==
Having lost her father early, Narcissa Chisholm was transferred between family members during her youth. Initially, her elder sister and brothers were educated at Dwight Mission School while her mother raised her. Narcissa attended Rev. Bushyhead's mission school c. 1843. Consistent with her later focus on Cherokee civilization and assimilation, Narcissa's memoirs also related how his son Dennis Bushyhead was educated at Princeton University before being elected Principal Chief of the Cherokees, and that his son Jessy Bushyhead became a physician in Claremore, Indian Territory.

Narcissa Chisholm moved to Fort Smith, Arkansas, in 1846 to live with her decade-older sister Jane and attended an academy there run by Melvin Lynde. She then moved to southern Indiana where she attended a school run by John Byers Anderson. She returned to Fort Smith in 1848 and attended a female academy, Mrs. Sawyer's School, in Fayetteville, Arkansas. After graduating with a degree in music and art in 1850, she replaced her music teacher for a year. She also served as a bridesmaid at the wedding of prominent Cherokee Wash Mayes.

She then accepted a position teaching music in east Tennessee. While teaching in Masonic High School in Jonesborough, Washington County, Tennessee, she met Virginia-born civil engineer Robert L. Owen Sr., who was surveying a railroad route over the Appalachian Mountains from Lynchburg, Virginia, toward Nashville, Tennessee. They married on October 4, 1853.

They moved near the Clinch River while her husband continued his survey work, and then to Lynchburg, where Owen became President of the Virginia and Tennessee Railroad. Narcissa bore two sons: the future U.S. Army Dr. William Otway Owen, born 1854 in Broylesville, Tennessee and future U.S. Senator Robert Latham Owen Jr. born 1856 in Lynchburg, Virginia. She later spent many pages of her Memoirs describing her Scots-Irish heritage, as well as labeling her Cherokee heritage as "royal," explaining in part the native names she had given her sons: Caulunna (William) and Oconosta (Robert Jr). In Lynchburg, the Owen family and their slaves lived at Point of Honor, a mansion overlooking the James River and various railroad lines serving the city. Through his mother and grandmother Betty Lewis, George Washington's niece, Robert Owen inherited several relics of the first President.

== Career ==
=== Virginia ===
During the American Civil War, Robert Owen ran the railroad (a crucial supply and troop line for the Confederacy) and his wife and Mrs. Thomas J. Kirkpatrick led the women of St. Paul's Episcopal Church who sewed uniforms and otherwise assisted the same cause. Their sons were too young to fight, but Robert Owen's brother, Dr. William Owen, ran 30 hospitals in the city (a major hospital center for the Confederacy). Lynchburg never fell to Union forces, which withdrew after false reports (for some of which Narcissa Owen later took credit) of Confederate troop strength in the town.

Shortly after the war ended, Robert Owen resigned as president of the Virginia and Tennessee Railroad, after losing a fight against merging the railroad with several owned by former Confederate General William Mahone. Robert Owen served a term in the Virginia Senate, then purchased a plantation near Norfolk, Virginia, from a former surveyor buddy, where he died unexpectedly shortly before the Panic of 1873. Her husband's death left Narcissa Owen with young children to raise, and what little financial security remained after Robert Owen's death soon vanished. Narcissa Owen returned to teaching to send her sons to college.

=== Indian Territory ===
In 1880, Narcissa Owen moved to the Cherokee Nation to teach music at the Cherokee Female Seminary, the first institution of higher learning for women west of the Mississippi River. Her younger son Robert L. Owen Jr. had graduated from Washington and Lee University in 1887, and had already moved to Okhahoma to continue a teaching career as orphanage principal, as well as to read law and begin a legal career. Robert Owen became Indian Agent (1885–1889) during the presidency of Democrat Grover Cleveland, then organized the First National Bank of Muskogee in 1890 (and served as its president as well as practiced law for the next decade).

In 1895, the 62-year old Narcissa Owen retired from teaching, devoting herself to art and refuting misconceptions of Native Americans as primitive and uncouth. She studied at the Library of Congress and the Corcoran Gallery, and painted landscapes, portraits, and miniatures using oil paint, as well as used the more traditional women's medium of needlework. Her self-portrait of 1896 displayed above indicates her Victorian-era respectability and wealth. Owen also displayed tapestries at the Oklahoma Territory's pavilion, for she did not believe in hierarchies of artistic medium.

Her painting "Thomas Jefferson and His Descendants" won a medal at the Louisiana Purchase Exposition in St. Louis, Missouri, in 1904. Displayed in the Indian Territory Building throughout the exposition, Narcissa's portraits showcased six generations of Jefferson's descendants: Thomas Jefferson himself, his daughter Martha Jefferson Randolph, his grandson Thomas Jefferson Randolph, his great-granddaughter Mrs. R. G. H. Kean, his other great-granddaughter Mrs. John S. Morris, and Adelaide and Pattie Morris. Narcissa's interest in honoring Thomas Jefferson comes from her family's history and friendship with him. In 1808, Owen's father Thomas Chisholm receives the Silver Peace and Friendship Medal from Jefferson for his efforts to unite the Eastern and Western Cherokees. The medal became lost to the family for some time after the passing of Alfred Chisholm in 1862. It wasn't until 1905 that the medal was recovered by a prospector in Wichita Mountains. As a sign of further admiration, Owen later named her ranch near the Little Caney River "Monticello," after Jefferson's home in Virginia.

In 1900, her son Robert L. Owen began a six-year legal battle in Oklahoma and Washington, D.C., which ultimately led to a judgment for the balance due the Cherokee from the 1835 treaty ($5 million including interest from 1838). This catapulted him into prominence, and he was elected one of Oklahoma's first two U.S. Senators after the territory achieved statehood on November 17, 1907. Although some Native American leaders disagreed with Robert Owen and had opposed statehood (and some would later disagree with the disbursement of the funds obtained), the Sequoyah Constitutional Convention (which met in Muskogee in 1905) proved a precursor of the statehood convention.

== Washington, DC ==
Narcissa Owen moved to Washington, D. C., where she acted as her son's hostess, and continued working to refute misconceptions of Native Americans. On October 3, 1907, Owen privately published her Memoirs, probably in Washington, D.C., although another copy was found at the multi-ethnic, library-friendly Tuesday Club of Bartlesville, Oklahoma, which had gathered at her Oklahoma home "Monticello" in honor of her 75th birthday the previous May 1, as mentioned at the Memoir's conclusion. As Owen's modern editor has noted, the Memoirs combine traditional storytelling modes (and humor, including trickster imagery) and Native perspectives deriving back to Sarah Winnemucca's Life Among the Piutes (1883) and Lucinda Lowery Hoyt Keys' Historical Sketches of the Cherokees (1889).

== Death and legacy ==
Owen died in Guthrie, Oklahoma, on July 12, 1911, aged 79 (far from her ranch as well as Bartlesville). Her remains were returned to Lynchburg, Virginia, for a funeral at St. Paul's Church, and burial beside her husband at Spring Hill cemetery (where her son Robert would later also be buried).

Her former home, Point of Honor is on the National Register of Historic Places, as is the Cherokee Female Seminary. The former is now a city museum for Lynchburg; the latter is a coeducational state university.

Her painting of Thomas Jefferson is now in the collection of the University of Virginia. Her painting of Sequoyah (a copy of a painting by Charles Bird King) is owned by the Oklahoma Historical Society, which allows its display at the Oklahoma Judicial Center; the Society also has her self-portrait of 1896 depicted above and gold medal. Several of her other paintings are in the collection of the Oklahoma Museum of Art and Gilcrease Museum.

== See also ==
- List of Native American artists
- Visual arts by indigenous peoples of the Americas
