= John W. Daniel =

American politician (1842–1910)

John Daniel
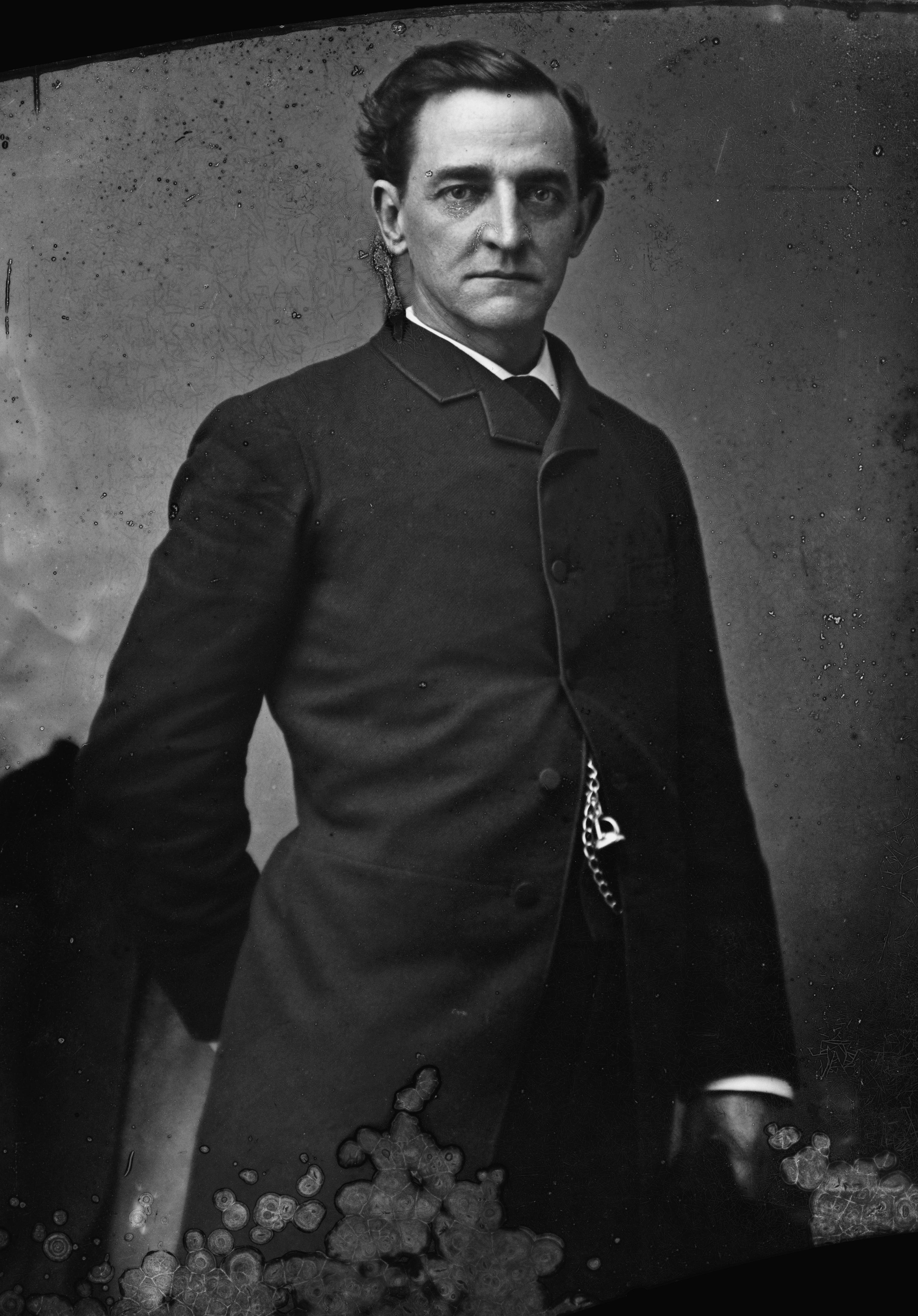
- Portrait, 1890–1910

United States Senator from Virginia
- In office March 4, 1887 – June 29, 1910
- Preceded by: William Mahone
- Succeeded by: Claude A. Swanson

Member of the U.S. House of Representatives from Virginia's 6th district
- In office March 4, 1885 – March 3, 1887
- Preceded by: John Tucker
- Succeeded by: Samuel I. Hopkins

Member of the Virginia Senate from Campbell County and Lynchburg City From 1876 to 1880 only from Campbell County
- In office 1876-1882
- Preceded by: Thomas J. Kirkpatrick
- Succeeded by: J. Singleton Diggs

Member of the Virginia House of Delegates from Campbell County
- In office 1869-1872

Personal details
- Born: September 5, 1842 Lynchburg, Virginia, U.S.
- Died: June 29, 1910 (aged 67) Lynchburg, Virginia, U.S.
- Resting place: Spring Hill Cemetery; Lynchburg, Virginia, U.S.
- Party: Democratic
- Education: University of Virginia, Charlottesville

Military service
- Allegiance: Confederate States
- Branch/service: Confederate States Army
- Years of service: 1861–1864
- Rank: Major
- Battles/wars: American Civil War • Gettysburg campaign • Battle of the Wilderness

John Warwick Daniel (September 5, 1842 – June 29, 1910) was an American lawyer, author, and Democratic politician from Lynchburg, Virginia. Daniel served in both houses of the Virginia General Assembly and both houses of the United States Congress. He represented Virginia the U.S. House from 1885 to 1887, and in the U.S. Senate from 1887 until his death in 1910.

Daniel was sometimes referred to as the "Lame Lion of Lynchburg", alluding to his permanent disability incurred during the Battle of the Wilderness, while serving as a major in the Confederate Army.

== Early and family life ==
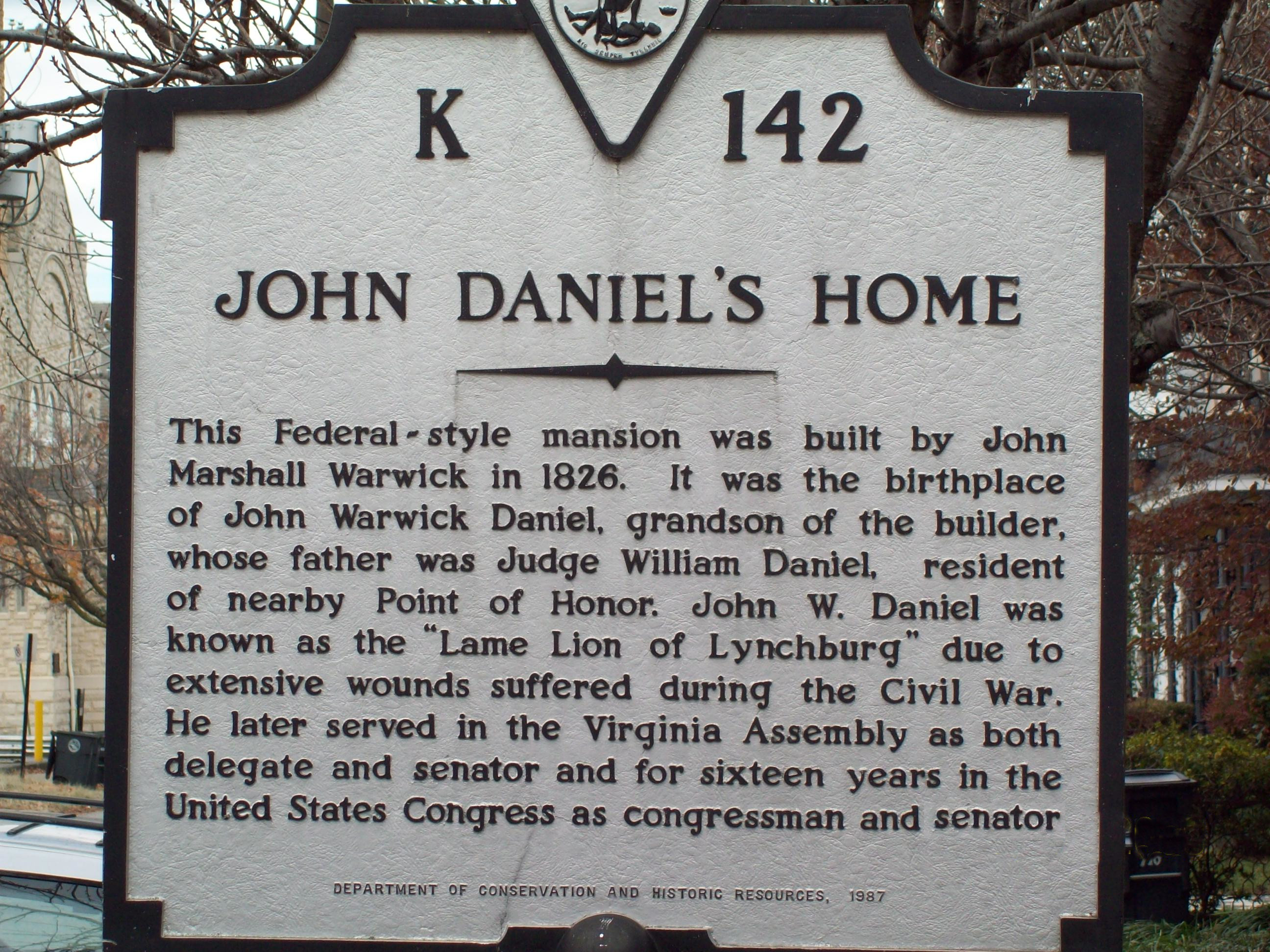
John Marshall Warwick House plaque, Lynchburg VA, November 2008

John W. Daniel was born in Lynchburg, Virginia, the son of Judge William Daniel (who served on what later would be called the Virginia Supreme Court) and his wife Sarah Ann Warwick Daniel, the daughter of a wealthy Lynchburg tobacco merchant. His mother died after the birth of his sister Sarah (1845-1918), when John was three years old. Judge Daniel soon announced the sale of all or part of the former estate, which is now the Daniel's Hill Historic District. Young John was raised by his maternal grandparents and attended private schools, including Dr. Gessner Harrison's University School. Judge Daniel remarried well (to Elizabeth Cabell) and built another mansion nearby, Rivermont, which is now the name of a city park, although much of that estate was subdivided after the legislature allowed the city to expand in 1870 and the Panic of 1873 affected.

In 1869, John W. Daniel married Julia Elizabeth Murrell, and they had two daughters and three sons.

== American Civil War ==
After Virginia seceded from the Union during the American Civil War, Daniel enlisted in a Lynchburg cavalry troop, but by early May secured a commission as a second lieutenant in the 27th Virginia Infantry. He was wounded during the First Battle of Bull Run. While convalescing, Daniel was transferred to the 11th Virginia Infantry, and earned promotions to first lieutenant and later adjutant. Daniel served in the Confederate Army until 1864, eventually attaining the rank of major. On March 24, 1863, he became a staff officer for fellow Lynchburger and Major General Jubal A. Early, under whom he served in the Gettysburg campaign, among others. In May 1864, during the Battle of the Wilderness, a minie ball shattered Daniel's femur. He thereafter had to use a crutch to walk, and he resigned his commission.

== Postwar legal and state political career ==
Daniel studied law at the University of Virginia in Charlottesville, and he was admitted to the bar in 1866. He joined his father's practice at Lynchburg.

Despite being disabled from his war injury, he enjoyed oratory, particularly memorializing the Confederate war effort and excoriating Congressional Reconstruction and Republicans. He entered politics and Campbell County voters elected him as a member of the Conservative Party to represent (part-time) them alongside Rufus Murrell and Robert C. Burkholder in the House of Delegates from 1869–72. He did not seek re-election.

Daniel unsuccessfully sought nomination to the U.S. House of Representatives for Virginia's 6th congressional district in 1872 and 1874, between which elections he canvassed for Conservative Party candidates in the state elections in 1873. The Funding Act which the legislature had passed in 1871 (although Daniel did not vote for it at the time) proved a major campaign issue in Virginia for the next decade. Daniel became one of its main supporters (known as "Funders"). Others, known as Readjusters advocated reducing payments on the bonds issued in 1871 which reaffirmed the debts Virginia had acquired before the Civil War to construct railroads, bridges, etc. Although the bonds traded at far below face value, they could be used at face value to pay state taxes, so they significantly cut state tax revenues. Also, the interest rate was kept at the prewar level, which was much higher than postwar interest rates.

In 1876, Daniel published his "A Treatise on the Law of Negotiable Instruments", which was reprinted several times. That year he also campaigned for Samuel J. Tilden, the Democratic presidential candidate (who lost). However, Campbell county voters had elected Daniel to the state senate the previous year, and he was re-elected once before resigning the part-time position in 1881. In 1877, Daniel became one of the leading Conservative orators against the leading Readjuster candidate, former Confederate general turned railroad tycoon William Mahone. Mahone ultimately withdrew his gubernatorial candidacy in favor of relatively unknown Frederick W.M. Holliday of Winchester, Virginia, who was elected.

Daniel was a presidential elector in the 1876 presidential election.

In 1880, Daniel spoke at the Democratic National Convention in Cincinnati, Ohio in favor of the candidacy of former Union General Winfield Scott Hancock, whom he praised as offering the best hope for reconciliation between North and south.

In 1881, Daniel was the Conservative Party's candidate for governor of Virginia, but lost by 12,000 votes (out of 211,000 cast) to William E. Cameron, the candidate of a coalition of Republicans and Readjusters. During one state senate debate, Daniel had orated it "were better to burn the schools...than sustain them on money taken by force" from bondholders. Since public schools were a key innovation of the Virginia Constitution of 1869 (but Thomas Jefferson had proposed them a century earlier), Readjusters portrayed Daniel as putting the interests of bondholders (few of whom lived in Virginia) above all others. Although Daniel had easily won re-election to the state senate in 1879, the Readjusters swept to victory in those state elections. State revenues remained insufficient to pay both bondholders and ordinary but minimal state government activities, and many school construction debts had not been paid for years.

After the 1882 election, Virginia's Conservative Party reorganized as the state's Democratic party, guided by railroad tycoon and future U.S. Senator John S. Barbour. On June 28, 1883, Daniel delivered the three-hour long keynote oration in the dedication of a statute of Confederate General Robert E. Lee at Washington and Lee University, which was republished by many newspapers, including outside the state. In the 1883 Virginia statewide election year, race and cronyism within the Readjuster and Republican ranks became major issues.

Although Daniel was not running for office directly that year, he and Mahone were the leading candidates for the U.S. Senate seat that the General Assembly would soon select. Daniel summarized the Democratic platform, "I am a Democrat because I am a white man and a Virginian." Democrats won control of the General Assembly, which was then allowed to reapportion legislative districts pursuant to the completed 1880 census. Daniel successfully defended the partisan redistricting in the Supreme Court of Appeals over Republican challenge. He also benefited because Democrats nominated him as the 6th congressional district (as he had long sought), after popular incumbent John Randolph Tucker was moved to the 10th congressional district.

Daniel was a delegate to the Virginia Constitutional Convention of 1901. He had advocated such a convention since 1895, and was elected as Campbell County's representative without opposition. At that convention, Daniel served on the suffrage committee and advocated requiring a voter to explain any section of the constitution, although some criticized his leadership. Future Senator Carter Glass of Lynchburg developed a compromise involving a poll tax and writing test which passed and became a means for disenfranchising African Americans and poor whites.

== Federal political career ==
In 1884, voters in Virginia's 6th congressional district elected Daniel as a Democrat to the Forty-ninth Congress to succeed fellow Democrat John Randolph Tucker, who due to congressional redistricting was elected to Virginia's 10th congressional district. Daniel delivered a speech during dedication of the Washington Monument on February 21, 1885, which extolled Virginia's central place in the nation, then served one congressional term, from March 4, 1885, to March 3, 1887, before elected to the U.S. Senate to replace Readjuster William Mahone. Fellow Confederate veteran Samuel I. Hopkins, a member of Labor party, succeeded Daniel, served a single term (the Fiftieth Congress), declined to run for re-election, and was succeeded by a Democrat.

In 1887, Virginia's General Assembly elected Daniel as a Democrat to the United States Senate to succeed Readjuster Republican William Mahone. He was reelected four times: in 1891, 1897, 1904, and 1910. Thus, he served from March 4, 1887, until his death, largely cooperating with the Democratic organization created by his fellow U.S. Senator Thomas S. Martin.

During his tenure, Daniel served as chairman of the Committee on Revision of the Laws of the United States (Fifty-third Congress). He was also a member of several committees, including the Committee on Corporations Organized in the District of Columbia (Fifty-fifth Congress), the Committee on Public Health and National Quarantine (Sixtieth Congress), and the Committee on Private Land Claims (Sixty-first Congress).

Daniel staunchly supported American intervention into Cuba during the 1890s, and often spoke at length on Spanish cruelties. He also argued against repeal of the Sherman Silver Act and for Democratic presidential candidate William Jennings Bryan, but by 1904 realized that was an ineffective campaign issue and helped remove it from the party's national platform. He also campaigned unsuccessfully for federal funding of schools.

Always interested in veterans affairs, Senator Daniel was heavily involved in the initial planning of the Virginia Memorial on the Gettysburg Battlefield, as years earlier he had helped organize Lynchburg's commemoration of General Robert E. Lee upon his death.

== Death and legacy ==
Daniel suffered a stroke in Philadelphia in October 1909, but won re-election from the General Assembly the following January. However, he had another stroke (which paralyzed his left side) in Florida in March 1910. Daniel returned to convalesce in a Lynchburg sanitorium, where he died of a cerebral hemorrhage on June 29, 1910. His family refused an offer of a state funeral. He was survived by his wife, sister, two sons and a daughter, and buried in Lynchburg's Spring Hill Cemetery.

Subscriptions were raised for a large bronze statue of Daniel, in a Confederate uniform and seated with a crutch leaning nearby. The statue by Moses Ezekiel contains the inscription: "Foremost and best beloved Virginian of his time". It was dedicated in 1915 and stands near the intersection of Park Avenue and 9th Street in Lynchburg.

His father's home Point of Honor was listed on the National Register of Historic Places in 1970, and it currently is operated as a house museum by the City of Lynchburg. The John Marshall Warwick House, his birthplace, was listed on the National Register of Historic Places in 1996.

== Bibliography ==
- The Character of Stonewall Jackson (1868, originally a lecture)
- The Law and Practice of Attachment, under the Code of Virginia (1869)
- A Treatise on the Law of Negotiable Instruments (1876, published in two volumes)

== See also ==
- List of members of the United States Congress who died in office (1900–1949)

U.S. House of Representatives
Preceded by John Tucker	Member of the U.S. House of Representatives from Virginia's 6th congressional district 1885–1887	Succeeded by Samuel I. Hopkins
U.S. Senate
Preceded by William Mahone	U.S. Senator (Class 1) from Virginia; 1887–1910; Served alongside: Harrison H. Riddleberger, John S. Barbour Jr., Eppa Hunton, Thomas S. Martin	Succeeded by Claude A. Swanson
Party political offices
Preceded by Frederick W. M. Holliday	Democratic nominee for Governor of Virginia; 1881	Succeeded by Fitzhugh Lee
First	Keynote Speaker of the Democratic National Convention; 1896	Succeeded by Charles S. Thomas
