= William E. Cameron =

American journalist (1842–1927)

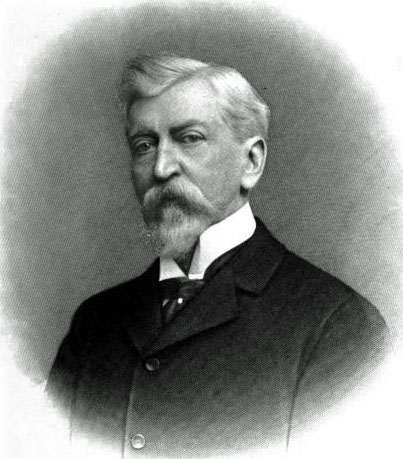

39th Governor of Virginia
- In office January 1, 1882 – January 1, 1886
- Lieutenant: John F. Lewis
- Preceded by: Frederick W. M. Holliday
- Succeeded by: Fitzhugh Lee

78th Mayor of Petersburg
- In office July 1, 1876 – January 1, 1882
- Preceded by: William F. C. Gregory
- Succeeded by: Fletcher H. Archer

Personal details
- Born: William Evelyn Cameron; November 29, 1842 Petersburg, Virginia, US
- Died: January 25, 1927 (aged 84) Louisa County, Virginia, US
- Party: Readjuster; Democratic
- Spouse: Louisa Cameron
- Occupation: Lawyer; journalist; politician

Military service
- Allegiance: Confederate States
- Branch/service: Confederate States Army
- Rank: Captain
- Unit: 12th Virginia Infantry

William Evelyn Cameron (November 29, 1842 – January 25, 1927) was a Confederate soldier who became a Virginia lawyer, journalist, and politician. He served as the 39th governor of Virginia from 1882–1886, elected as the candidate of the Readjuster Party headed by William Mahone.

== Early life and education ==
William Evelyn Cameron was born in Petersburg, Virginia. His parents were cotton-broker Walker Anderson Cameron and Elizabeth Page Walker. He attended local private classical schools operated by Charles Campbell and Thomas D. Davidson before being sent to Hillsboro, North Carolina, to attend the North Carolina Military Institute in 1858. The following year he attended Washington College in St. Louis, Missouri, then became a clerk on a Mississippi River steamboat. Tutored By then Captain John F. Reynolds, Cameron received an appointment to the United States Military Academy at West Point, New York, but did not attend, choosing to fight for the Confederacy against the U.S. Army.

=== American Civil War ===
When the American Civil War started, Cameron became a drillmaster with the Missouri Minute Men at Camp Jackson. On May 9, 1861, U.S. Army captain Nathaniel Lyon dispersed the secessionists during what became known as the Camp Jackson affair, during which Cameron was captured but soon released.

Returning to Virginia on June 14, 1861, Cameron was elected as the second lieutenant of Co D, 12th Virginia Infantry, formerly a militia group in his native Petersburg. His militia company did not re-elect him during its reorganization. Instead, on May 1, 1862, he was promoted to first lieutenant and appointed regimental adjutant. Severely wounded at the Second Battle of Bull Run on September 30, 1862, Cameron was temporarily promoted to captain and assistant adjutant general upon returning to duty in June 1863. He would serve under Brigadier General William Mahone throughout the rest of the war, with his rank confirmed on November 2, 1863.

=== Marriage and family ===
After the war, Cameron returned to Petersburg, where he married Louisa Clarinda Egerton (1846–1908) on October 1, 1868. They had three children.

== Lawyer and journalist ==
Cameron read the law under Judge William T. Joynes and was admitted to the Virginia bar. Although Cameron began a legal practice, he also began a newspaper career, editing first the Petersburg Index, then the Richmond Enquirer and Richmond Whig.

In 1869, Cameron fought a duel with Robert William Hughes after Cameron criticized Hughes in print for opportunism: he had changed his political views from pre-war Secessionist to post-war Republican. According to the writer Frank Luther Mott,

[T]he parties met at Chester Station, on the Petersburg Railroad; but, before they could exchange a shot, the police made their appearance, and caused a flight of the parties. They passed into North Carolina, where they fought on the 12th of June with pistols. Cameron was hit in the breast at the first fire, the ball striking a rib and glancing. Hughes demanded another fire, but the surgeons declared that Cameron could not deliver another shot, and the affair ended 'to the satisfaction of all parties.'

== Political career ==
Cameron became active in the Readjuster Party led by his former commander, William Mahone. Petersburg voters elected him mayor and re-elected him several times, so he served from 1876 to 1882.

In 1881, he was the gubernatorial candidate of the Readjuster Party and elected governor with biracial support defeating John Warwick Daniel (who represented the state Funder faction, a group who wanted to pay the debt and its interest in whole) by nearly 6% of the vote. During his term from 1882–1886, he attempted to implement his party's debt reduction programs and racial integration in certain areas. In 1882 it led to the passage of legislation for a land-grant college for blacks, what is now Virginia State University in Ettrick, near Petersburg.

On February 17, 1882, Cameron personally led a successful anti-oyster pirate expedition of two boats and armed state militia in the ongoing Oyster Wars of the Chesapeake Bay, capturing seven ships. The state had attempted to license and control traffic in the popular seafood, but 5,800 Virginia oyster boats often disregarded laws related to trying to preserve the harvest. An attempt at a repeat raid the following year ended in Cameron's steamships unsuccessfully racing the "laughing lasses" of the pirate sailboat Dancing Molly. His embarrassment was compounded by the fact that none of the alleged pirates captured in the second raid were convicted, but Cameron persevered and helped form the Board on the Chesapeake and its Tributaries to enforce oyster law.

After his term as governor ended in 1886, Cameron briefly left Virginia. He returned and resumed a career in politics, but as a conservative Democrat. Cameron represented Petersburg in the Virginia Constitutional Convention of 1901–1902. At this time, the Democrat-dominated legislature created a disfranchising constitution and essentially ended black voting. The Republican Party, which had made a brief and small comeback after the collapse of the Readjusters, ceased to be competitive in the state.

Cameron edited the Norfolk Virginian-Pilot newspaper from 1906 to 1919.

== Death and legacy ==
William Evelyn Cameron died on January 25, 1927, at the home of one of his sons in Louisa County, Virginia. He was buried at Blandford Cemetery in Petersburg. His executive papers are held by the Library of Virginia.

== See also ==
- List of mayors of Petersburg, Virginia

== Notes and references ==
Party political offices
First	Readjuster nominee for Governor of Virginia; 1881	Succeeded by None
Political offices
Preceded by Frederick W. M. Holliday	Governor of Virginia; 1882–1886	Succeeded by Fitzhugh Lee
