= Point of Honor =

Historic house in Lynchburg, Virginia, US

- U.S. National Register of Historic Places
- Virginia Landmarks Register
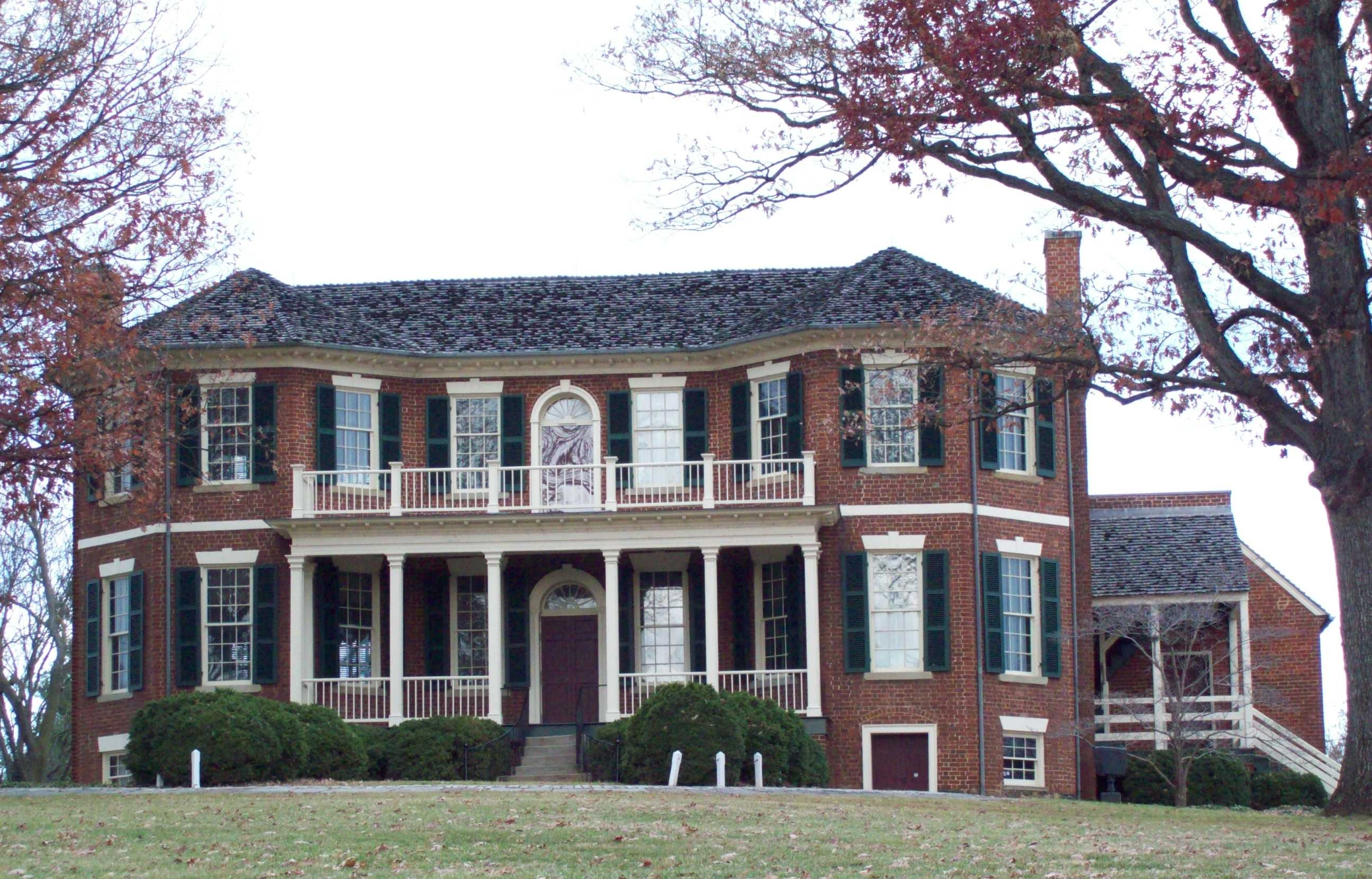
- Point of Honor, Lynchburg VA, November 2008

- Location within Virginia Location within the United States
- Location: 112 Cabell St., Lynchburg, Virginia
- Coordinates: 37°25′13″N 79°8′39″W
- Area: 4 acres (1.6 ha)
- Built: 1806
- Architectural style: Federal
- NRHP reference No.: 70000872
- VLR No.: 118-0014

Significant dates
- Added to NRHP: February 26, 1970
- Designated VLR: December 2, 1969

Point of Honor is an historic home, now a city museum, located in Lynchburg, Virginia. The property has commanding views of the city and the James River. Its name originated due to the land on which it is built being used as a clandestine dueling ground.

== History ==
=== 1800s ===
Its builder and designer, Dr. George Cabell, was a friend of Thomas Jefferson, and physician to Patrick Henry. Before building the house, he purchased 856 acres of land including Daniel's Island, Treasure Island and Woodruff Island from Lewellen Jones, who had bought it from Christopher Lynch, son of Quaker patriot Charles Lynch (1736–1796) and nephew of John Lynch, who started the ferry for which the city is named.

=== 1820s ===
After Cabell died of complications after falling off a horse in 1823, and his widow died three years later, it passed to William Lewis Cabell, who may have leased it to the Langhorne family (as discussed below), before he and his wife Eliza Daniel died of tuberculosis in 1830. It was inherited by her father, Judge William Daniel (delegate to the Virginia general assembly 1798–1799). When he too died in 1839, it passed to his son William Daniel Jr. (Eliza's brother and also the father of United States Senator John Warwick Daniel, "the Lame Lion of Lynchburg.")

==== Langhorne family ====
At two different times in the 19th century, members of the Langhorne family owned Point of Honor. Henry Langhorne, who owned the Langhorne Mills in Lynchburg, purchased it in 1828. Later, but still before the war, John S. Langhorne held the residence. His eldest son Chiswell Langhorne became a wealthy industrialist, and daughter Elizabeth Langhorne Lewis was a prominent suffragette. John S. Langhorne's granddaughters included Mrs. Charles Dana Gibson (the original Gibson Girl), and Nancy Langhorne, Viscountess Lady Astor (the first woman elected to the British Parliament).

=== 1840-1850s ===
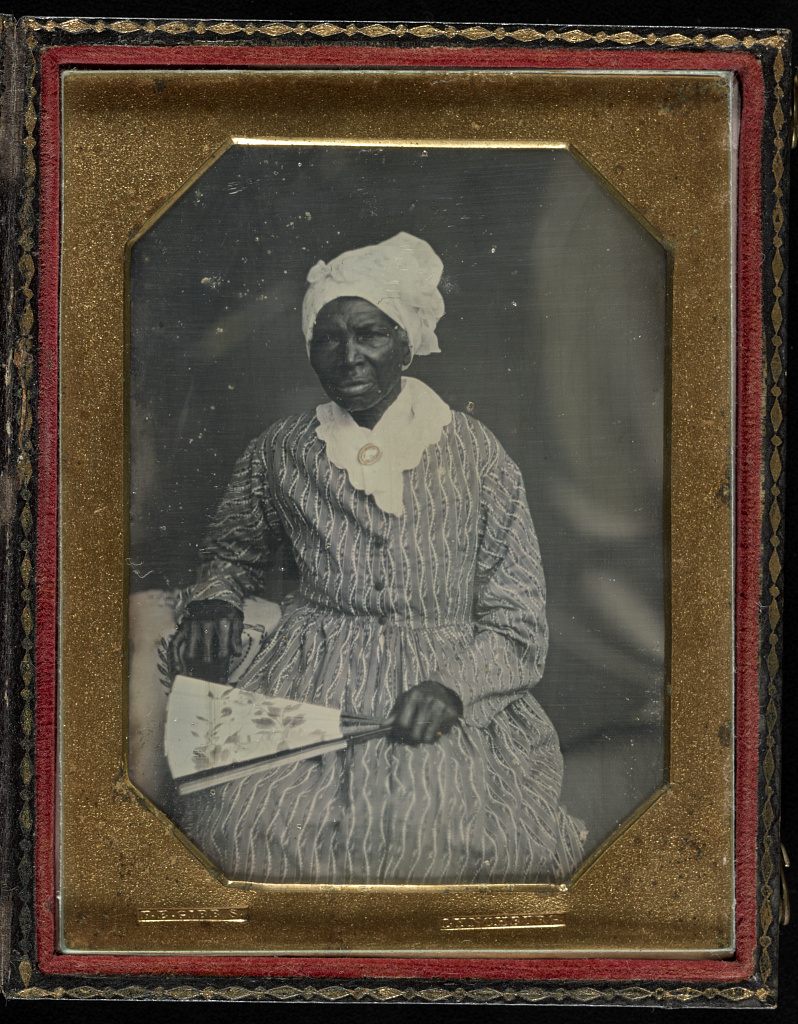
Mary Brice, a woman enslaved at the Point of Honor plantation c. 1853

David P. Payne bought the house in two acres of land in 1848, and in 1857 sold it back to Daniel, who sold it to Colonel Robert L. Owen Sr., who was President of the Virginia and Tennessee Railroad, and whose son Robert Latham Owen Jr. later became a United States Senator. Owen ran the railroad during the American Civil War, and became a state senator immediately afterward, but resigned his post because he opposed consolidating this railroad with others acquired by William Mahone. Owen died a financially ruined man in 1873, the same year the merged railroad went bankrupt, and the family mansion again changed hands.

=== 1870s onwards ===
By 1878 it was owned by L.E. Lichford, a grocery wholesaler who also had a warehouse nearby. Three generations of the family owned the property, during which time the surrounding area developed. James R. Gilliam Jr. bought the house in 1928 and deeded it to the City of Lynchburg, which used part of the property as a recreation center until the Historical Foundation received the deed in 1968.

== Architecture ==
The irregularly shaped two-story Federal mansion is built of stuccoed brick. The facade is composed of a three-bay center section flanked by two octagonal ended projections. Construction was started in 1806, and completed in 1815. It was renovated about two decades later, with wallpaper and stucco added, and perhaps a porch which was removed during the 1977 restoration.

It bears a strong relationship to the Hancock-Wirt-Caskie House in Richmond, Virginia.

It was listed on the National Register of Historic Places in 1970, and opened as a public museum in 1978.

=== Historic American Buildings Survey photographs ===
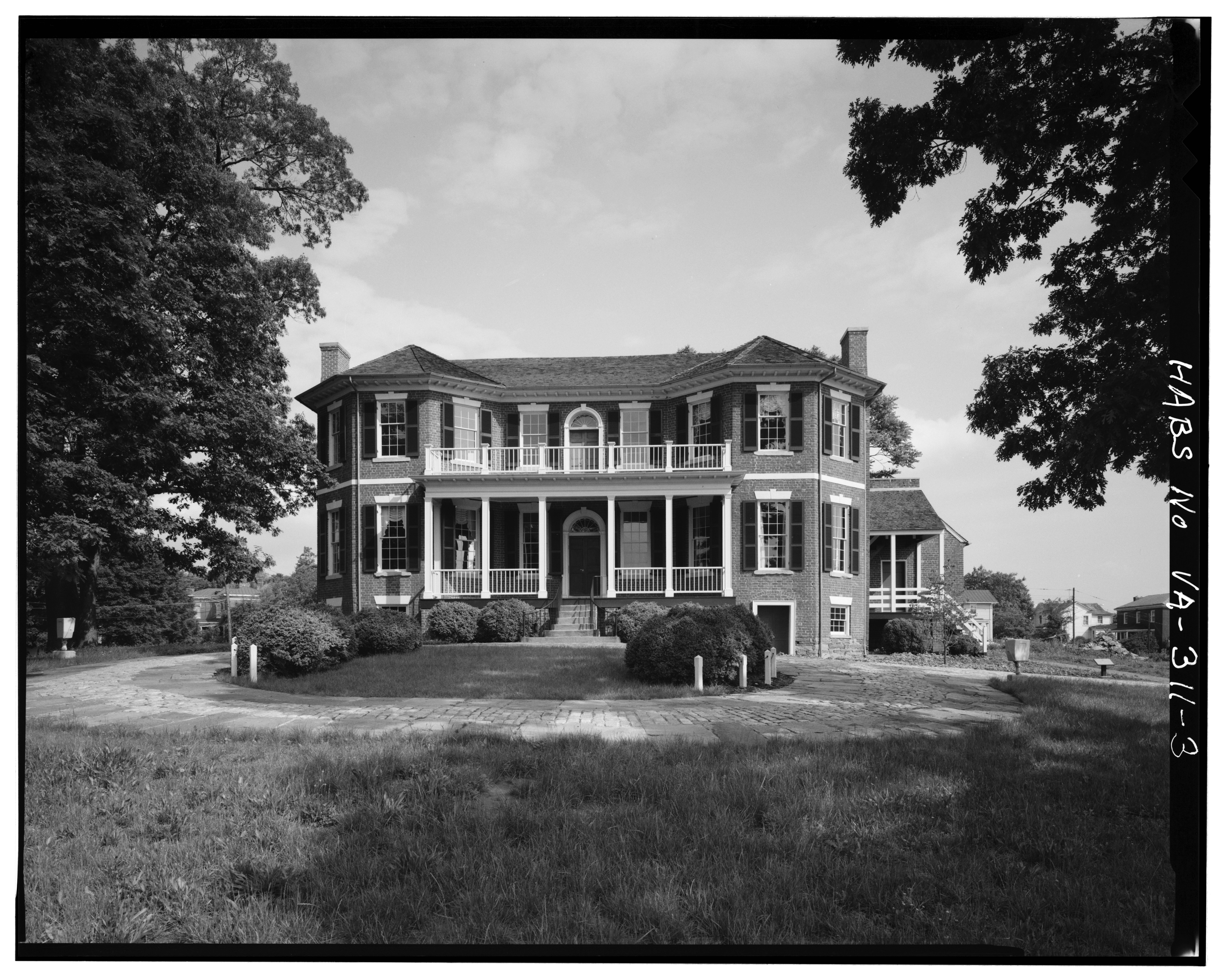
Front elevation

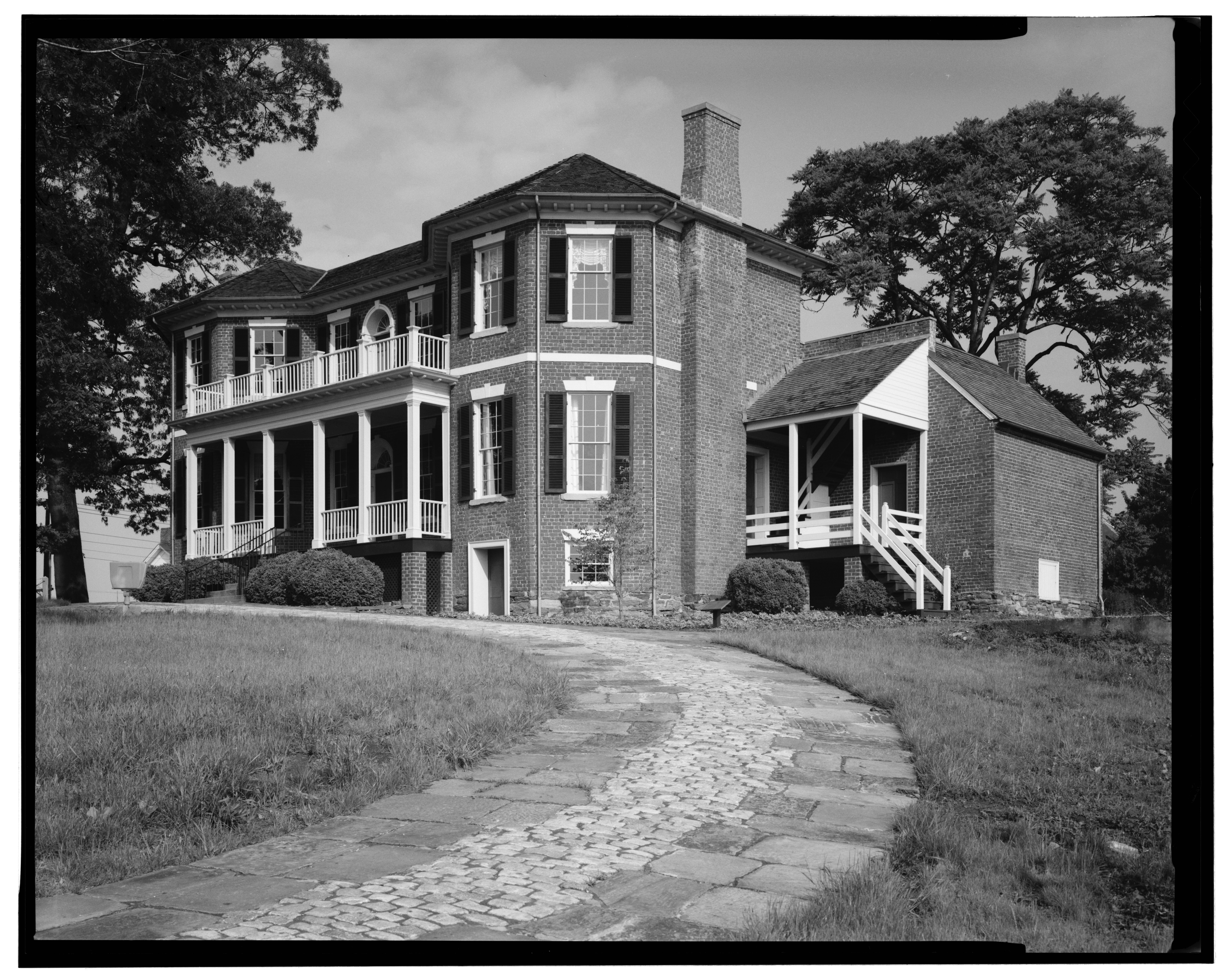
Facade and office

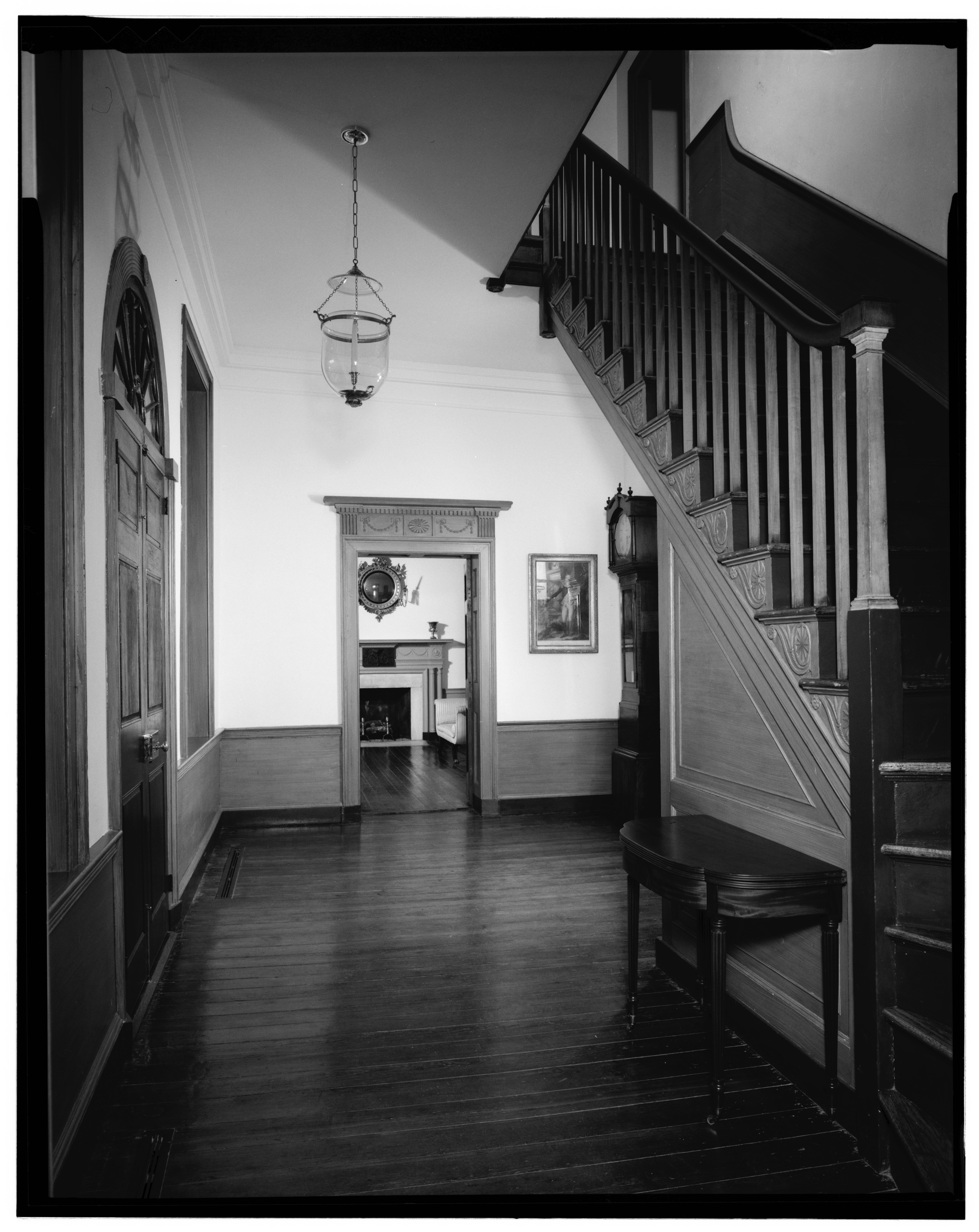
Entrance hall

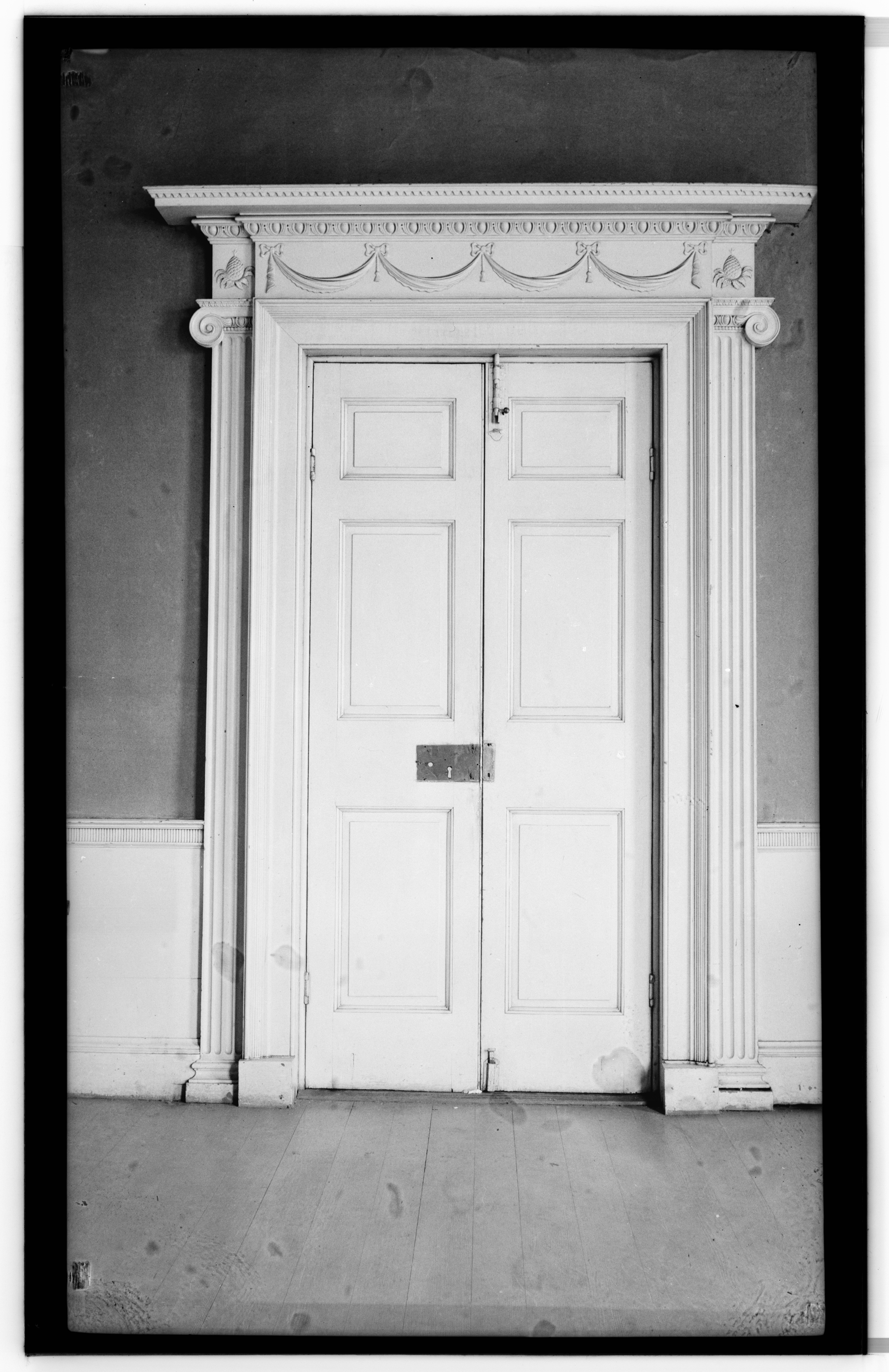
Doors

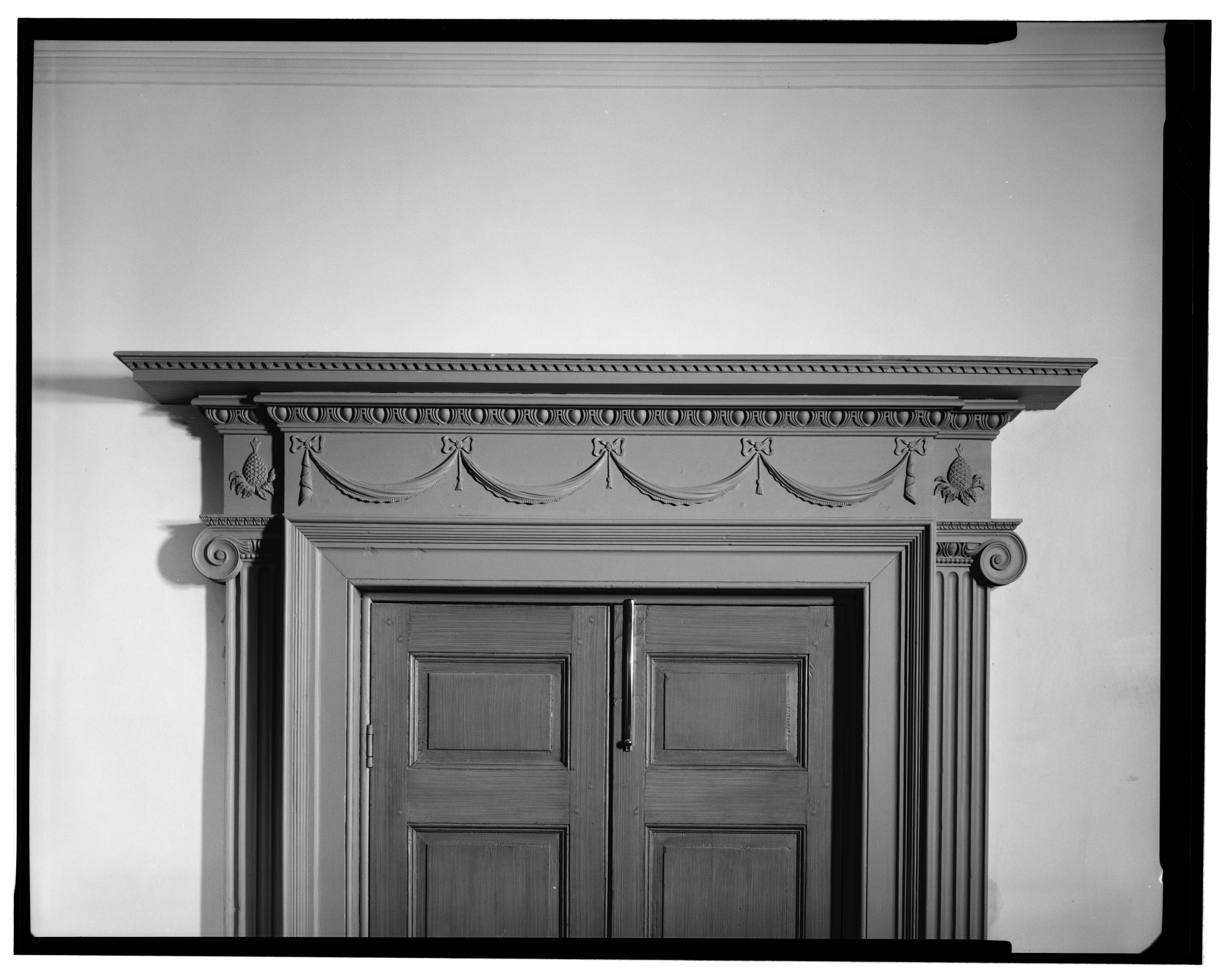
Doors and entablature

Floor plan
