= Elliott House =

Elliott House or Elliot House may refer to:

in New Zealand

- Elliott House, Wellington, a historic building in Wellington, New Zealand

in the United States (by state then city)

- John W. Elliott House, Eutaw, Alabama
- S. T. Elliott House, Kingman, Arizona
- Elliott House (Tempe, Arizona), listed on the National Register of Historic Places
- Elliott House (Bentonville, Arkansas), listed on the National Register of Historic Places
- Elliott-Meek House, Camden, Arkansas
- Elliott House (Fordyce, Arkansas)
- Elliott House of Studies, a nonprofit organization based in Savannah, Georgia
- James Elliott Farm, New Harmony, Indiana
- Charles D. Elliott House, Newton, Massachusetts
- Luther Elliott House, Reading, Massachusetts
- Eliot House (South Hadley, Massachusetts), at Mount Holyoke College
- Elliott House B & B, Beulah, Michigan
- Elliott-Donaldson House, Okolona, Mississippi, listed on the National Register of Historic Places
- T. S. Eliot House, St. Louis, Missouri
- Dr. Samuel MacKenzie Elliott House, New York, New York
- Elliot-Powers House and Garage, Fargo, North Dakota
- Elliott House (Indian Hill, Ohio)
- Elliott House (Portland, Oregon)
- Marion Reed Elliott House, Prineville, Oregon
- Elliott House (Richburg, South Carolina)
- Thornwell-Elliott House, Fort Mill, South Carolina
- Joel Elliott House, Belton, Texas, listed on the National Register of Historic Places
- Johnson-Elliott House, Fort Worth, Texas, listed on the National Register of Historic Places
- E. Clyde and Mary Elliott House, Wharton, Texas, listed on the National Register of Historic Places
- Dicks-Elliott House, Lynchburg, Virginia
- Small-Elliott House, Walla Walla, Washington, listed on the National Register of Historic Places
- Edward C. Elliott House, Madison, Wisconsin, listed on the National Register of Historic Places
- Eliot House, at Harvard University
