= Carter Glass House =

Historic house in Virginia, United States

- U.S. National Register of Historic Places
- U.S. National Historic Landmark
- U.S. Historic district – Contributing property
- Virginia Landmarks Register
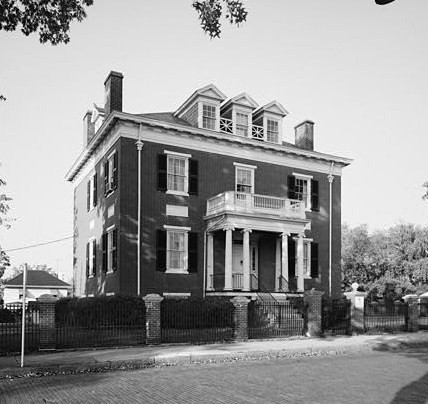
- 1976 HABS photograph

- Location within Virginia Location within the United States
- Location: 605 Clay St., Lynchburg, Virginia
- Coordinates: 37°24′55″N 79°8′50″W
- Area: 1.5 acres (0.61 ha)
- Built: 1827, 1907
- Architect: Wills, John
- Part of: Court House Hill-Downtown Historic District (ID01000853)
- NRHP reference No.: 76002183
- VLR No.: 118-0006

Significant dates
- Added to NRHP: December 8, 1976
- Designated NHL: December 8, 1976
- Designated CP: August 16, 2001
- Designated VLR: February 15, 1977

Carter Glass House is a historic house at 605 Clay Street in Lynchburg, Virginia. Built in 1827, it is nationally significant as the longtime home of United States congressman, senator, and Treasury Secretary Carter Glass (1858–1946), who championed creation of the Federal Reserve System and passage of the Glass-Steagall Act, which constrained banking activities. The house was designated a National Historic Landmark in 1976. It now serves as a parish hall for the adjacent St. Paul's Church.

== Description and history ==
The Carter Glass House is located in Lynchburg's Court House Hill area, on the west side of Clay Street south of 6th Street. It shares the block with St. Paul's Church, from which it is separated by a broad lawn. It is a 2 1/2-story, almost square, red brick dwelling. It sits on a raised basement and has a shallow slate covered hipped roof. The front facade features a one-bay wide, wood-floored, Ionic order portico supported by four columns and two pilasters.

The house was built in 1827 by John Mill, a local lawyer and architect. In 1853 it passed to his daughter and son-in-law, George Dixon Davis. In 1907 it was purchased by Carter Glass, who made the house is primary residence until 1923, and owned it until his death in 1946. It was acquired by the church in 1960. Glass was responsible for modernizing the house's systems and adding dormers to its roof; there have been only modest changes since his ownership.

Carter Glass was a major political figure in the fundamental development of the United States' financial systems. As a Congressman, he chaired the House Committee on Banking and Currency, co-sponsoring the Glass-Owen Bill which in 1913 established the Federal Reserve System. In 1920 he was elected to the Senate, where he sponsored the Glass-Steagall Act of 1933, which required separation between investment and commercial banking. During the 1930s he was a leading critic and opponent of President Franklin Delano Roosevelt's New Deal reforms.

== See also ==
- List of National Historic Landmarks in Virginia
- National Register of Historic Places listings in Lynchburg, Virginia
