= Arthur Bowman =

Arthur Bowman may refer to:

- A. Blaine Bowman (Arthur 'Blaine' Bowman, born 1946), American physicist
- Arthur Ray Bowman, Oregon businessman for whom two structures in and around Prineville, Oregon are named:
  - Arthur R. Bowman Dam
  - A. R. Bowman Memorial Museum

== See also ==
- Arthur A. Baumann (1856–1936), British writer and politician
