= National Register of Historic Places listings in Crook County, Oregon =

Location of Crook County in Oregon

This list presents the full set of buildings, structures, objects, sites, or districts designated on the National Register of Historic Places in Crook County, Oregon, United States, and offers brief descriptive information about each of them. The National Register recognizes places of national, state, or local historic significance across the United States. Out of over 90,000 National Register sites nationwide, Oregon is home to over 2,000, and 6 of those are found in Crook County.

This National Park Service list is complete through NPS recent listings posted March 14, 2025.

== Current listings ==
	Name on the Register	Image	Date listed	Location	City or town	Description
1	Thomas M. Baldwin House	Thomas M. Baldwin House	September 10, 1987 (#87001523)	126 W. 1st Street; 44°18′03″N 120°50′52″W	Prineville	Thomas M. Baldwin (1854–1919) was a leading banker during Central Oregon's prosperous first decades of the 20th century. He lived in this 1907 Colonial Revival house through the height of his career. The house, designed by the firm of prominent architect John V. Bennes, is the finest house of its style in Prineville.
2	Crook County Bank Building	Crook County Bank Building	June 19, 1991 (#91000802)	246 N. Main Street; 44°18′09″N 120°50′49″W	Prineville	
3	Marion Reed Elliott House	Marion Reed Elliott House	February 21, 1989 (#89000049)	305 W. 1st Street; 44°18′05″N 120°50′59″W	Prineville	This 1908 house is the largest and best-preserved Queen Anne style residence in Prineville. It is also significant as one of a handful of surviving structures that were built by prominent local contractor Jack Shipp (1858–1942).
4	Old First National Bank of Prineville and Foster and Hyde Store	Old First National Bank of Prineville and Foster and Hyde Store	December 2, 1985 (#85003035)	243 and 247 N. Main Street; 44°18′10″N 120°50′51″W	Prineville	The First National Bank of Prineville was organized in 1887 as the first bank in Central Oregon, and erected its second building in 1905. Its dignified American Renaissance styling reflects the prosperity of the bank, city, and county. It was the first of three prominent buildings whose use of native basalt from the same quarry lends a distinctive feel to central Prineville.
5	Lamonta Compound – Prineville Supervisor's Warehouse	Lamonta Compound – Prineville Supervisor's Warehouse	April 8, 1986 (#86000846)	1175 NW Lamonta Road; 44°18′37″N 120°51′11″W	Prineville	Built by the Civilian Conservation Corps in 1933–1934, this complex is typical of projects carried out by the CCC on behalf of the Forest Service. It represents that era's shift in Forest Service architecture toward comprehensive site planning, and the policy evolution from custodial superintendence of the national forests toward active natural resource management.
6	The Roba Ranch	The Roba Ranch	November 7, 2007 (#07001159)	66953 Roba Ranch Road; 44°13′37″N 120°00′06″W	Paulina vicinity	

== See also ==
- National Register of Historic Places listings in Oregon
- Listings in neighboring counties: Deschutes, Grant, Harney, Jefferson, Wheeler
- Historic preservation
- History of Oregon
- Lists of Oregon-related topics
