= Warwick House =

Warwick House can refer to:

- John Marshall Warwick House, a historic house in Lynchburg, Virginia
- Julius Blackburn House, a historic estate in Scott County, Kentucky
- Warwick House, a listed building in Nantwich; see Regent and Warwick House
- Warwick House, one of the towers of TaiKoo Place, Hong Kong
- Warwick House, Charing Cross, London, the home of Princess Charlotte of Wales (1796-1817).
