= Marion Reed Elliott House =

Historic house in Oregon, United States

- U.S. National Register of Historic Places
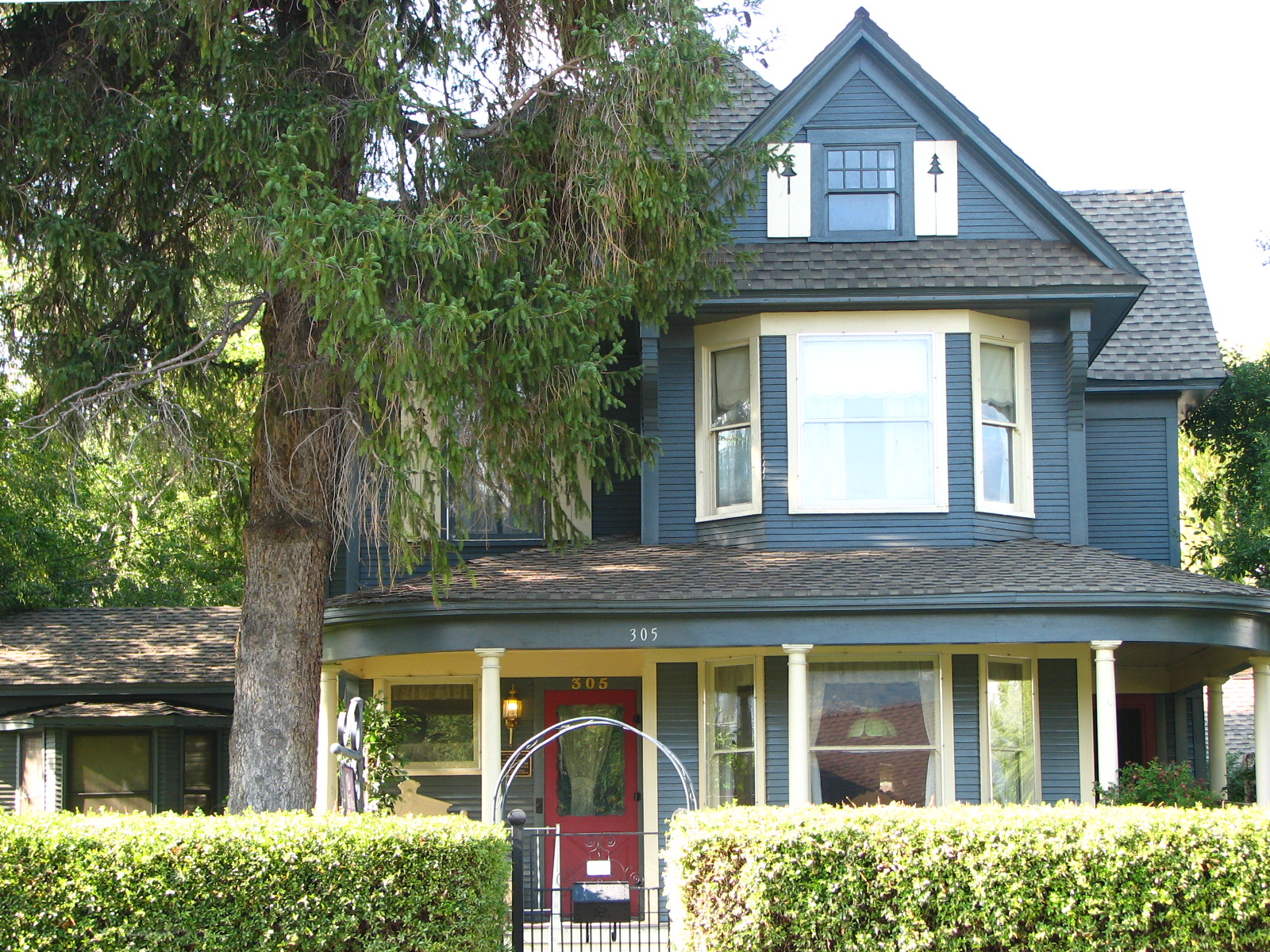
- The Elliott House in 2007
- Location: 305 W. 1st Street; Prineville, Oregon
- Coordinates: 44°18′05″N 120°50′59″W
- Area: 0.21 acres (0.085 ha)
- Built: 1908
- Built by: Jack Shipp
- Architectural style: Exterior: Queen Anne with Colonial Revival influences Interior: Arts and Crafts
- NRHP reference No.: 89000049
- Added to NRHP: February 21, 1989

The Marion Reed Elliott House is a historic house in Prineville, Oregon, United States. Built in 1908, it is the largest and best-preserved Queen Anne style house in Prineville. It is also significant as one of a handful of surviving structures that were built by prominent local contractor Jack Shipp (1858–1942). (Note: Other buildings by Shipp include the Crook County Courthouse (1909) and the Thomas M. Baldwin House (1907).) Marion Elliott (1859–1934), an educator and successful attorney, lived in the house from its construction until his death. Both men's careers benefited from the economic boom that occurred in Prineville in the first decades after railroads began reaching Central Oregon around 1900, (Note: Beginning with the opening of the Columbia Southern Railway to Shaniko in 1900.) the period when the Elliott House was built.

The house was added to the National Register of Historic Places in 1989.

== See also ==
- National Register of Historic Places listings in Crook County, Oregon
