= Thomas M. Baldwin House =

United States historic place

- U.S. National Register of Historic Places
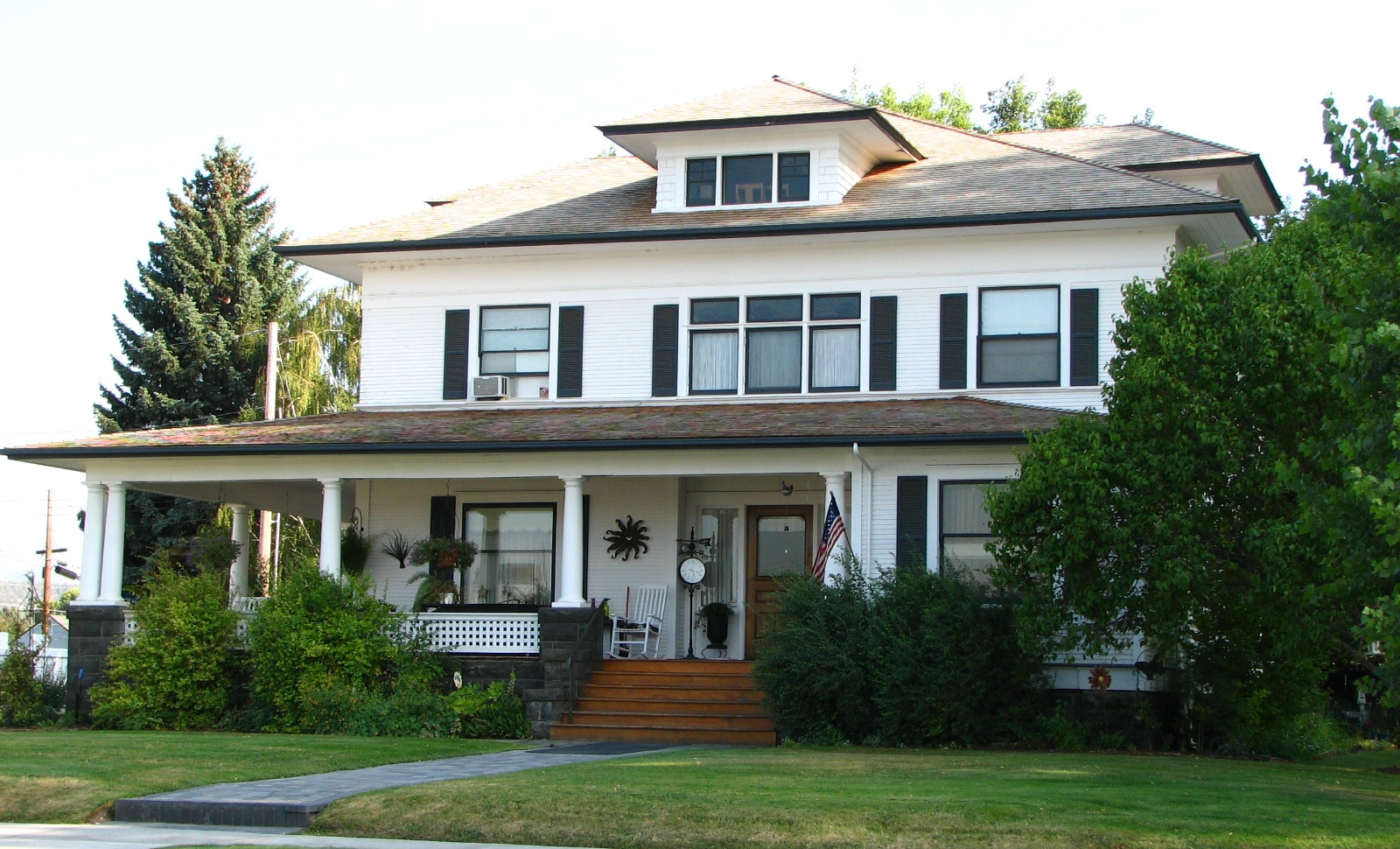
- The Baldwin House in 2007
- Location: 126 W. 1st Street; Prineville, Oregon
- Coordinates: 44°18′03″N 120°50′52″W
- Built: 1907
- Built by: Jack Shipp
- Architect: Bennes, Hendricks and Tobey
- Architectural style: Colonial Revival
- NRHP reference No.: 87001523
- Added to NRHP: September 10, 1987

The Thomas M. Baldwin House is a historic house located in Prineville, Oregon, United States. It is noted for its association with Baldwin, as well as for its architectural values.

Thomas M. Baldwin (1854–1919) was one of the most prominent bankers in Prineville during the first decades of the 20th century, a period during which Crook County and Central Oregon prospered. By 1917 he rose to be president of the First National Bank, the oldest bank in the region. Baldwin had this impressive Colonial Revival house built in 1907, and lived in it through the height of his career. The house, designed by the firm of prominent Portland architect John V. Bennes, is the best designed and finished house of its style in Prineville.

The house was listed on the National Register of Historic Places in 1987.

== See also ==
- National Register of Historic Places listings in Crook County, Oregon
- Old First National Bank of Prineville
