= Court House Hill–Downtown Historic District =

Historic district in Virginia, United States

- Court House Hill – Downtown; Historic District
- U.S. National Register of Historic Places
- U.S. Historic district
- Virginia Landmarks Register
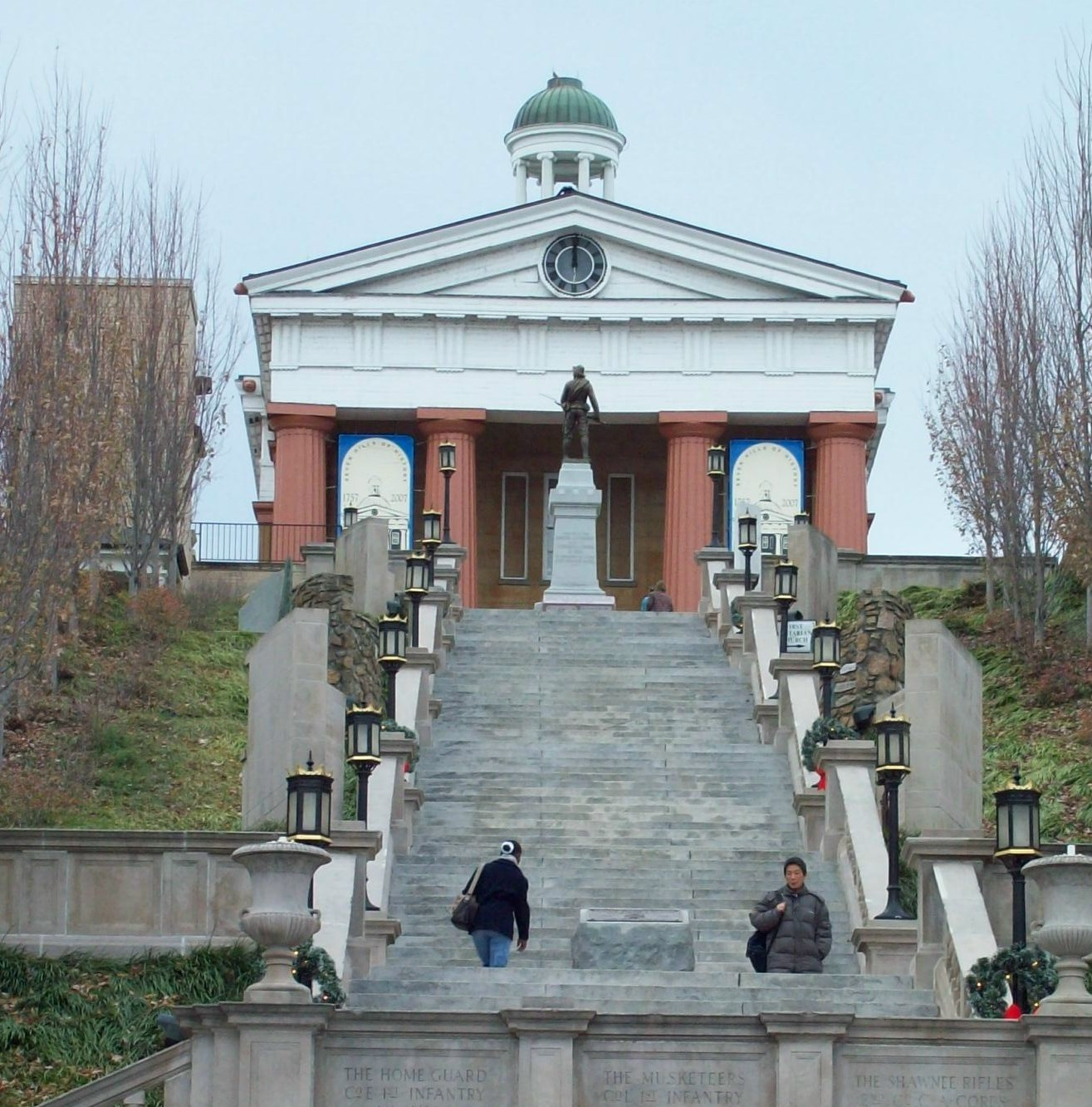
- Monument Terrace, November 2008

- Location within Virginia Location within the United States
- Location: Church, Clay, Court, Main Streets, roughly bounded by 5th through 13th Streets, Lynchburg, Virginia
- Coordinates: 37°24′51″N 79°08′37″W
- Area: 7.5 acres (3.0 ha)
- Built: 1815
- Architect: Chesterman, Aubrey
- Architectural style: Federal, Late Victorian
- NRHP reference No.: 01000853 (original); 02001361 (increase 1); 16000261 (increase 2); 100012795 (increase 3)
- VLR No.: 118-5163

Significant dates
- Added to NRHP: August 16, 2001
- Boundary increases: November 22, 2002; May 16, 2016; March 9, 2026
- Designated VLR: December 6, 2000, September 11, 2002

The Court House Hill–Downtown Historic District is a national historic district located in Lynchburg, Virginia. The area is situated on a promontory overlooking the Lower Basin Historic District on the south bank of the James River. The approximately 50-acre (200,000 m^{2}) district is composed of relatively intact city blocks of religious, commercial, residential, and governmental buildings and structures ranging in date from the early 19th century to the mid-20th century. Buildings in the district represent a variety of styles from the different periods, including the Federal, Greek Revival, Gothic Revival, Italianate, Queen Anne, Neoclassical, Italian Renaissance, Spanish Eclectic, Craftsman, and Art Deco styles.

It was listed on the National Register of Historic Places in 2001 and expanded in 2002 to also include the area between Madison and Harrison Streets and 5th and 7th Streets.

Some of the more notable contributing resources to this historic district include:

- Allied Arts Building (also listed separately on the National Register of Historic Places)
- Carter Glass House (also listed separately on the National Register of Historic Places)
- First Baptist Church (also listed separately on the National Register of Historic Places)
- Holy Cross Catholic Church
- Lynchburg Courthouse (also listed separately on the National Register of Historic Places)
- Lynchburg Furniture Company
- Monument Terrace
- St. Paul's Church (also listed separately on the National Register of Historic Places)
- John Marshall Warwick House (also listed separately on the National Register of Historic Places)
- Dicks-Elliott House

== Gallery ==
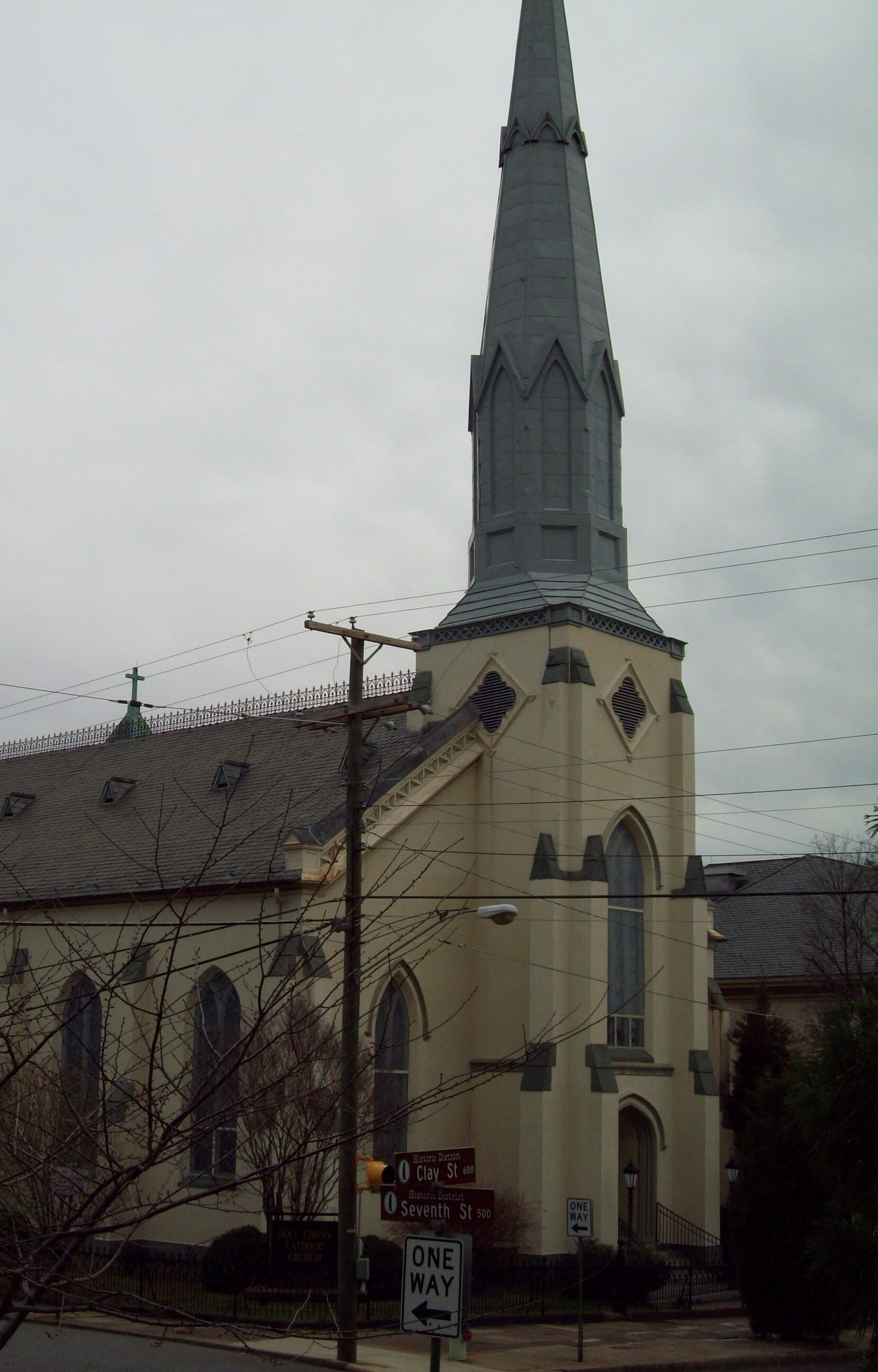
Holy Cross Catholic Church, Lynchburg VA, November 2008
