= Old First National Bank of Prineville =

- Old First National Bank of Prineville and Foster and Hyde Store
- U.S. National Register of Historic Places
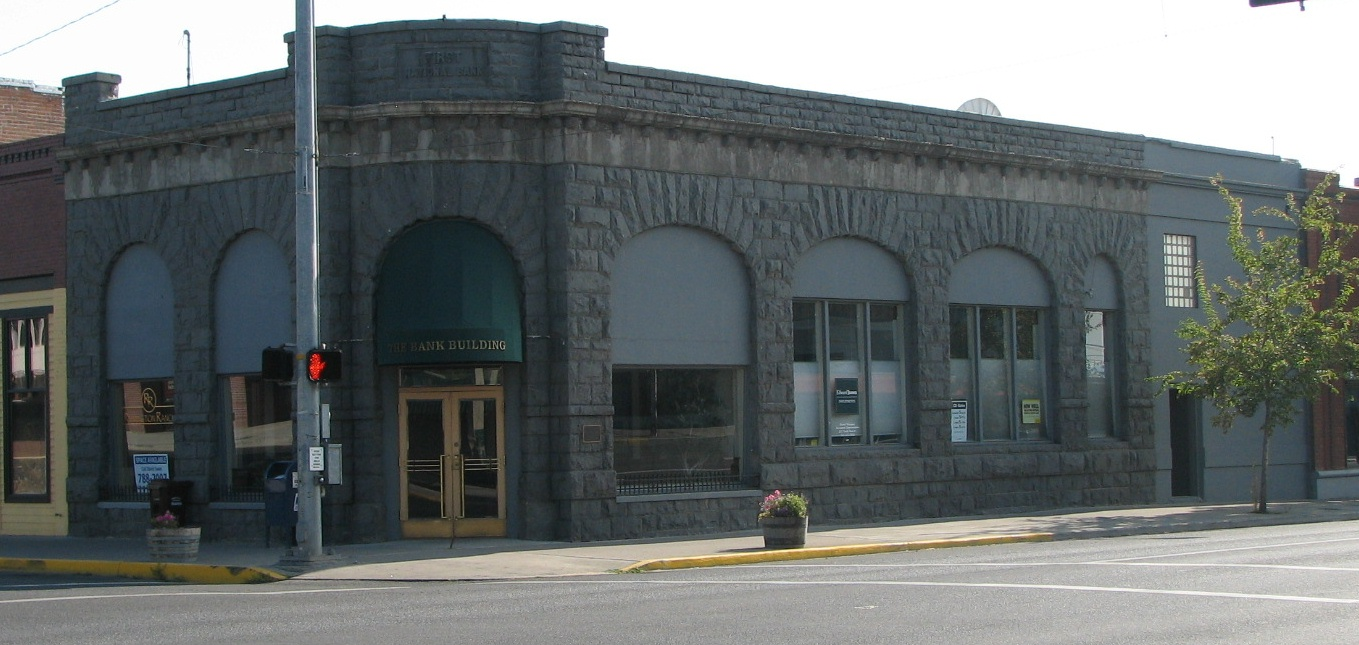
- The First National Bank building in 2007. The Foster and Hyde Store is barely visible at the left edge of the photo.

- Location within Oregon Location within the United States
- Location: Bank: 247 N. Main Street; Store: 243 N. Main Street; Prineville, Oregon
- Coordinates: 44°18′10″N 120°50′51″W
- Area: Less than 1 acre (0.40 ha)
- Built: Bank: 1905; Store: Before 1900
- Architectural style: Bank: American Renaissance; Store: Italianate
- NRHP reference No.: 85003035
- Added to NRHP: December 2, 1985

The Old First National Bank of Prineville is a historic commercial building in Prineville, Oregon, United States.

== History ==
The First National Bank was originally organized in 1887 as the first bank in Central Oregon, and erected its first building at a prominent downtown intersection in 1888. The present building on the site, the bank's second, was built in 1905 of locally-quarried stone. Its dignified American Renaissance architecture reflects the growth and prosperity of the banking company, and by extension that of Prineville and Crook County. It was also the first of three prominent buildings (Note: The other two basalt buildings are the Crook County Bank Building (1910) and the Crook County Courthouse (1909).) whose use of native basalt from the same quarry lends a distinctive feel to central Prineville.

The First National Bank of Prineville merged with the First National Bank of Portland in 1941, and moved to new quarters in Prineville in 1953. That same year, the historic bank building was joined with the adjacent Foster and Hyde Store building through removal of a common interior wall and converted to retail space. The two buildings were jointly listed on the National Register of Historic Places in 1985.

== See also ==
- National Register of Historic Places listings in Crook County, Oregon
