= Lamonta Compound – Prineville Supervisor's Warehouse =

- U.S. National Register of Historic Places
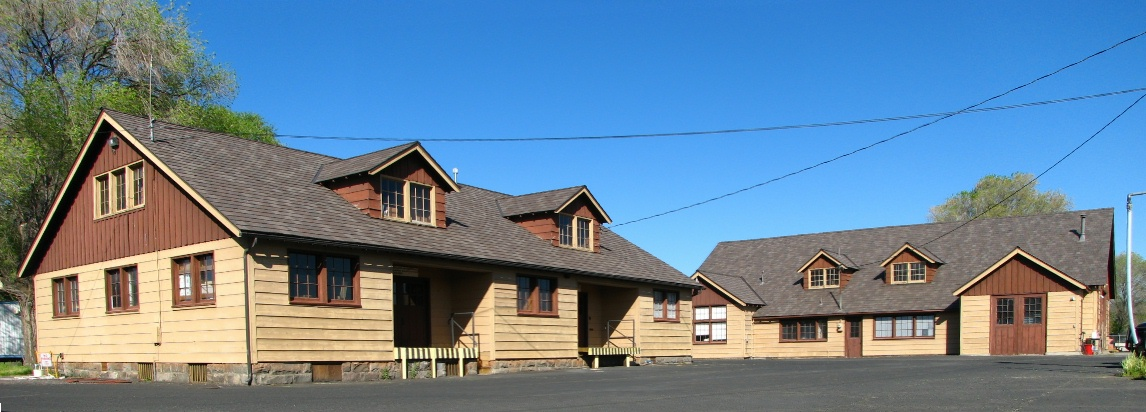
- The Lamonta Compound in 2009
- Location: 1175 NW Lamonta Road; Prineville, Oregon
- Coordinates: 44°18′37″N 120°51′11″W
- Area: 3.8 acres (1.5 ha)
- Built: 1933–1934
- Built by: Civilian Conservation Corps
- Architect: United States Forest Service, Pacific Northwest Regional Office Architecture Group
- Architectural style: Rustic
- MPS: Depression-Era Buildings TR
- NRHP reference No.: 86000846
- Added to NRHP: April 8, 1986

The Lamonta Compound – Prineville Supervisor's Warehouse is a complex of buildings and related infrastructure owned an operated by the Ochoco National Forest in Prineville, Oregon, United States. Built by the Civilian Conservation Corps in 1933–1934, it is the headquarters for field operations in the national forest and is typical of projects carried out by the CCC on behalf of the Forest Service. It represents that era's shift in the Forest Service's architectural vision toward comprehensive site planning, as well as its policy evolution from custodial superintendence of the national forests toward active natural resource management.

The complex was added to the National Register of Historic Places in 1986.

== See also ==
- National Register of Historic Places listings in Crook County, Oregon
