= Dicks-Elliott House =

- U.S. Historic district – Contributing property
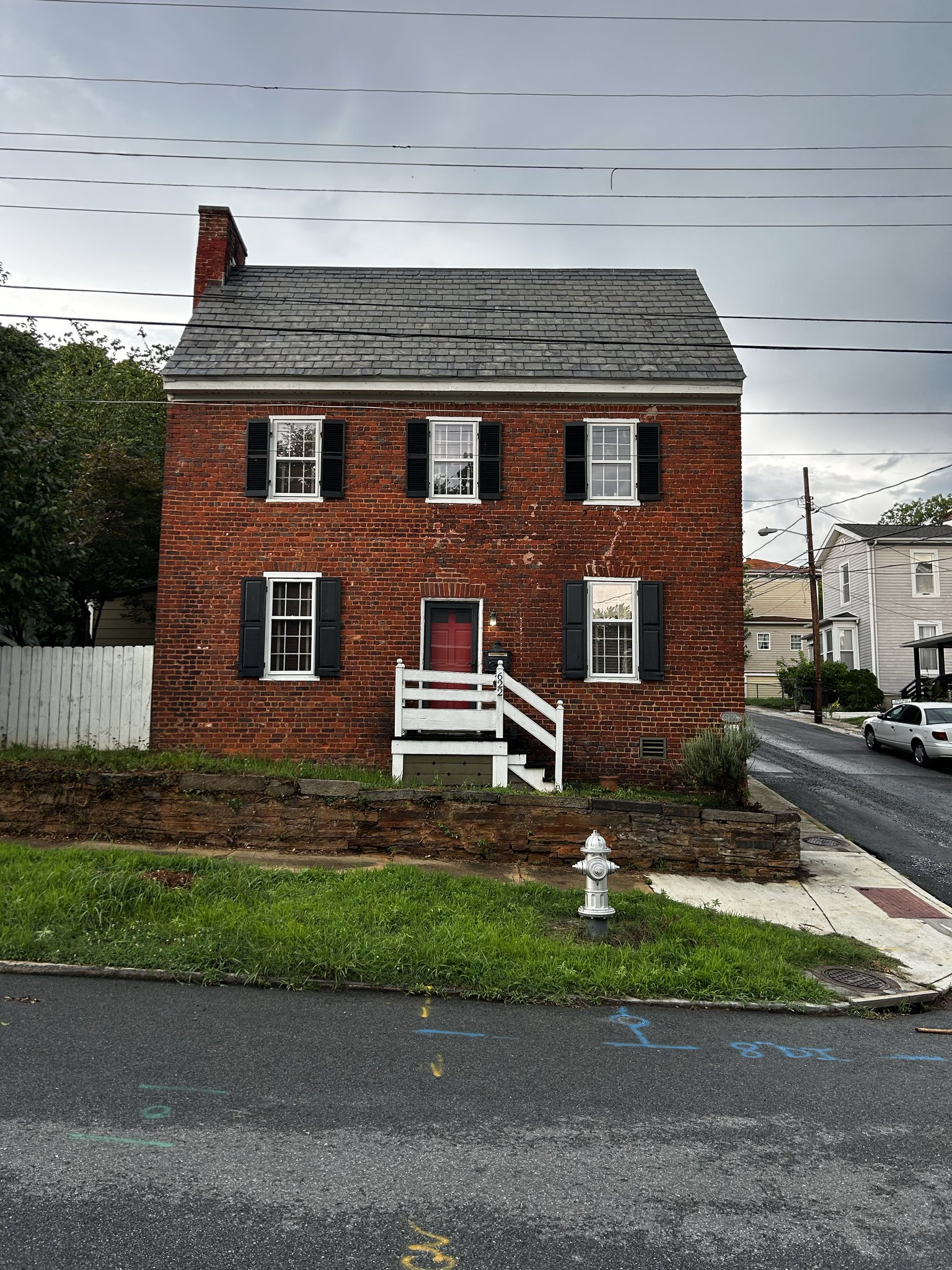
- The Dicks-Elliot House in 2025

- Location within Virginia Location within the United States
- Location: 622 Harrison Street, Lynchburg, Virginia
- Coordinates: 37°24′50.5″N 79°8′54.3″W
- Area: 0.12 acres (0.049 ha)
- Built: 1813
- Architect: Micajah Dicks (unconfirmed)
- Architectural style: Federal
- Part of: Court House Hill-Downtown Historic District (ID02001361)
- Designated CP: 2002

Dicks-Elliott House is a historic home located in Lynchburg, Virginia. It was built in 1813 by Agatha Terrell Dicks, widow of Windsor chair-maker William Dicks. Agatha was the daughter of noted Lynchburg-area Quakers Micajah Terrell and Sarah Lynch. On August 6, 1812, Agatha Dicks' uncle John Lynch sold the half-acre lot, number 175, to Agatha for $1.00.

== History ==
The dwelling that was built on the property is a 2 1/2-story three-bay Federal-style house. It is constructed of brick laid in three course American Bond, and is covered with a side-gable slate roof. First floor windows are six-over-nine double-hung sash, and upper-story windows are six-over-six double-hung sash. A pair of four-pane casement sash flank the chimney at the third, or garret, level. The front entrance is located in the middle bay, which is somewhat unusual for Lynchburg houses of the period. The six-panel door is accessed by a small frame porch that was constructed in the early 21st century. A 2 1/2-story, gable-roofed frame addition (built c. 2000) projects from the rear of the house, and a 2-story porch occupies the remainder of the rear facade. A small 1-story shed-rood addition projects from the northwestern elevation. According to insurance maps and physical evidence, the house originally had a 1 1/2-story, gable-roofed brick wing on this elevation. This wing was demolished in the early 20th century. A 1 1/2-story frame outbuilding dating to the early 21st century is located in the northwestern corner of the lot, which now measures approximately 1/12 of an acre.

While uncommon for three-bay houses of the period in Lynchburg, the interior floor plan is remarkably similar to plans of houses found in the Quaker communities surrounding Guilford County, North Carolina (William Dicks' home). Visitors entering through the front door immediately enter the primary chamber of the first floor, rather than a hallway or antechamber. A smaller room is accessed via a small hallway in the northeastern corner of the house. This hallway also contains a switchback winding staircase that serves all three floor levels. Combined with the wing that was demolished in the early 20th century, the house exhibited a modified three-cell plan that was typical for Quaker-built dwellings of the period. Trim details in the house are relatively spartan, and typically display Roman, rather than Greek, ovolo profiles.

In 1814, Agatha Dicks sold the house to Peter Elliott, a builder from Richmond. Dicks then traveled with her children to Ohio to flee the slaveholding state of Virginia. In 1815, she married noted Quaker missionary Isaac Harvey. She died in 1828 and is buried at the Old Springfield Friends Meeting House in Wilmington, Ohio.

Peter Elliott (1774–1863) was born in Gloucester County, Virginia. In the early 1790s, he moved to Richmond and began working for William McKim, a carpenter. In 1794, he served as a private in Captain John Stewart's Company, Major George Benn's Battalion, Colonel William Campbell's Regiment of Virginia Militia during the Whiskey Rebellion. In 1814, he moved to Lynchburg where he continued his profession of carpentry and building. In 1824, he moved to Lexington, Kentucky and added the blacksmith's trade to his repertoire. Around 1849, he moved to Evansville, Indiana to live with one of his sons, Joseph Peter Elliott. Peter Elliott died in Evansville, Indiana in 1863.

A partial list of subsequent owners of the house includes Irish tobacconist James V. Knight (from 1836–1858), merchant John T. Murrill and family (from 1858–1891), and WWII (in the 1950s). The house was rental property from 1891–1952, and the family of Arthur Walkup occupied the house from about 1918–1943.

The Dicks-Elliott House was determined to be individually eligible for listing in the National Register of Historic Places in 1999. It was included as a contributing property in the 2002 Boundary Increase of the Court House Hill-Downtown Historic District, which is listed on the National Register of Historic Places. The house is a recipient of a Merit Award from the Lynchburg Historical Foundation, and has been featured on HGTV's "Dream Builders," "Old Homes Restored," and "If Walls Could Talk" (Episode WCT-1507H "Emily and Scott Smith buy their 1812 (sic) home in Lynchburg, Va., for only a dollar and get way more than they bargained for. Throughout the five-year renovation, the couple has discovered marbles, buttons, carpenter tools, wedding rings, an 1800s bullet mold and apotropaios (good luck symbols) engraved into the fireplace."
