= Charles D. Elliott House =

Historic house in Massachusetts, United States

- U.S. National Register of Historic Places
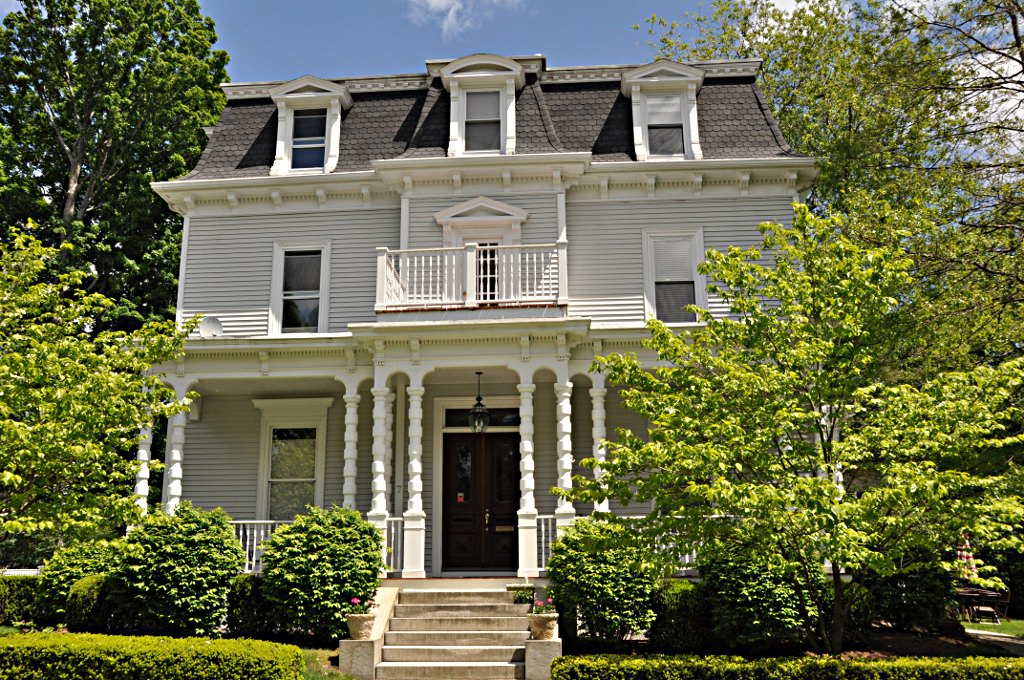

- Location within Massachusetts Location within the United States
- Location: 7 Colman St., Newton, Massachusetts
- Coordinates: 42°21′16.5″N 71°13′22.0″W
- Built: 1865
- Architectural style: Second Empire, Mansard
- MPS: Newton MRA
- NRHP reference No.: 86001792
- Added to NRHP: September 04, 1986

The Charles D. Elliott House is a historic house at 7 Colman Street in Newton, Massachusetts. The 2 1/2-story wood-frame house was probably built in the 1860s, and is one of Newton's finest Second Empire houses. It has a mansard roof pierced by dormers with rounded or triangular gabled pediments. Its main facade has a slightly projecting central section, which includes an elaborately decorated porch that projects further forward and extends the full width of the front. Charles D. Elliott was part owner of a local coal and lumber yard.

The house was listed on the National Register of Historic Places in 1986.

== See also ==
- National Register of Historic Places listings in Newton, Massachusetts
