= S. T. Elliott House =

Historic house in Arizona, United States

- U.S. National Register of Historic Places
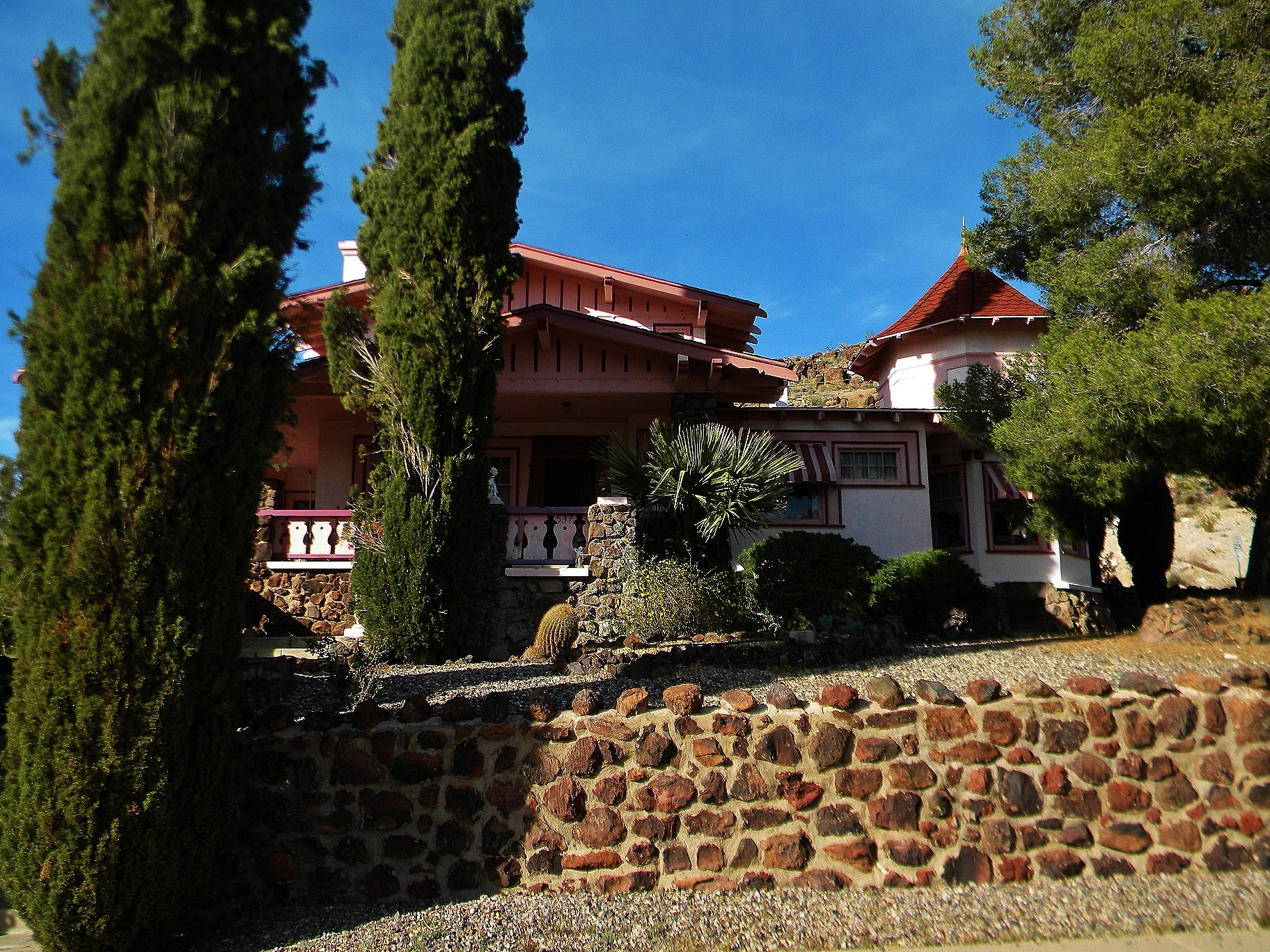

- Location within Arizona Location within the United States
- Location: 537 Springs Street; Kingman, Arizona
- Coordinates: 35°11′29″N 114°2′54″W
- Built: 1917
- Architect: J.B. Lammers
- Architectural style: Bungalow/Craftsman
- MPS: Kingman MRA
- NRHP reference No.: 86001139
- Added to NRHP: May 14, 1986

The S. T. Elliott House is a Bungalow/Craftsman style house located in Kingman, Arizona. It was evaluated for National Register listing as part of a 1985 study of 63 historic resources in Kingman that led to this and many others being listed.

== Description ==
The S. T. Elliott House is located at 537 Springs Street in Kingman, Arizona. The home was built in 1917. The home is a Bungalow/Craftsman style. The house was built by J. B. Lammers a contractor from Flagstaff, Arizona. Mr. Elliott came to Arizona in 1891 and he worked for the Babbitt Brothers in Flagstaff. He operated Elliott Stores from 1907 till his retirement in 1935. The Elliott Store was next to Watkins Drugs on Front Street (Andy Devine Avenue) and 4th Street. The house was added to the National Register of Historic Places in 1986.
