= John Marshall Warwick House =

Historic house in Virginia, United States

- U.S. National Register of Historic Places
- U.S. Historic district – Contributing property
- Virginia Landmarks Register
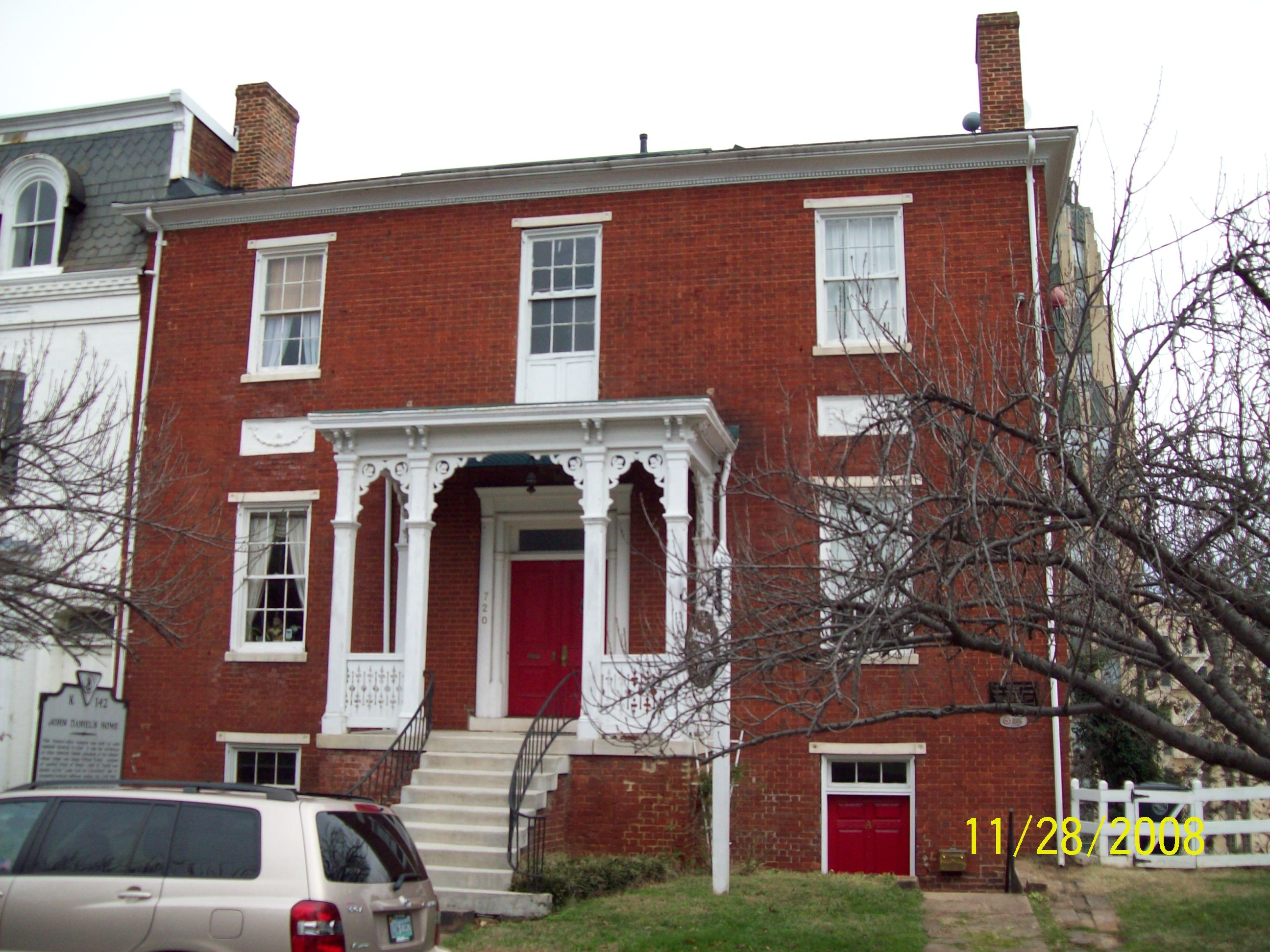
- John Marshall Warwick House, Lynchburg VA, November 2008

- Location within Virginia Location within the United States
- Location: 720 Court St., Lynchburg, Virginia
- Coordinates: 37°24′47″N 79°8′37″W
- Area: less than one acre
- Built: 1826
- Architectural style: Federal
- NRHP reference No.: 96001449
- VLR No.: 118-0019

Significant dates
- Added to NRHP: December 6, 1996
- Designated VLR: December 6, 1995

John Marshall Warwick House is a historic home located at Lynchburg, Virginia. It was built in 1826 by prominent Lynchburg tobacconist and city mayor (1833), John Marshall Warwick. It was one of the first houses to be built on the crest of Lynchburg Hill, later to be called Court House Hill, overlooking the James River. It exhibits the transition from the Federal to the Greek Revival styles. His grandson, United States Senator John Warwick Daniel was born in this home.

It was listed on the National Register of Historic Places in 1996. It is located in the Court House Hill-Downtown Historic District.

== Gallery ==
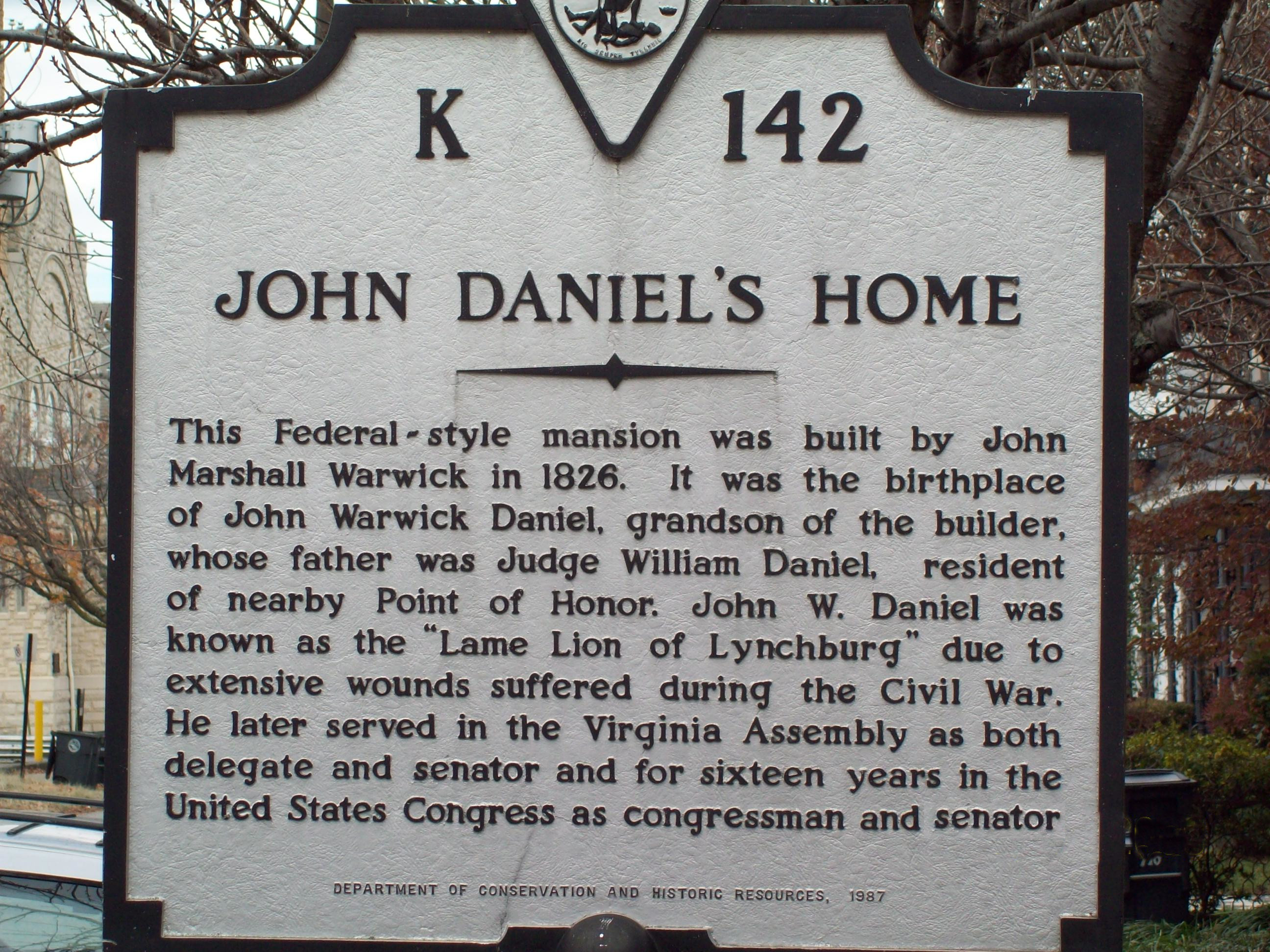
John Marshall Warwick House plaque, Lynchburg VA, November 2008
