= Luther Elliott House =

Historic house in Massachusetts, United States

- U.S. National Register of Historic Places
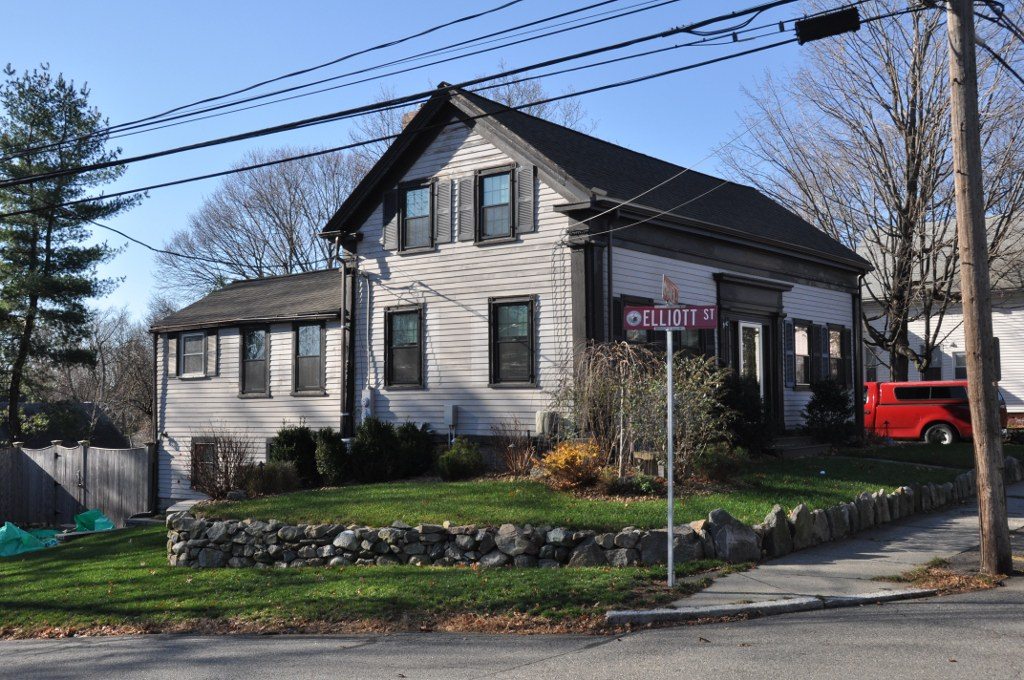

- Location within Massachusetts Location within the United States
- Location: 309 Haven Street, Reading, Massachusetts
- Coordinates: 42°31′24.2″N 71°6′2.86″W
- Built: 1850
- Architectural style: Greek Revival
- MPS: Reading MRA
- NRHP reference No.: 84002598
- Added to NRHP: July 19, 1984

The Luther Elliott House is a historic house in Reading, Massachusetts. The modestly sized 1.5-story wood-frame house was built in 1850 by Luther Elliott, a local cabinetmaker who developed an innovative method of sawing wood veneers. The house has numerous well preserved Greek Revival features, including corner pilasters, and a front door surrounded with sidelight windows and pilasters supporting a tall entablature.

The house was listed on the National Register of Historic Places in 1984.

== See also ==
- National Register of Historic Places listings in Middlesex County, Massachusetts
- National Register of Historic Places listings in Reading, Massachusetts
