= A. R. Bowman Memorial Museum =

History museum in Oregon, U.S.

Coordinates: 44.3028°N 120.8468°W

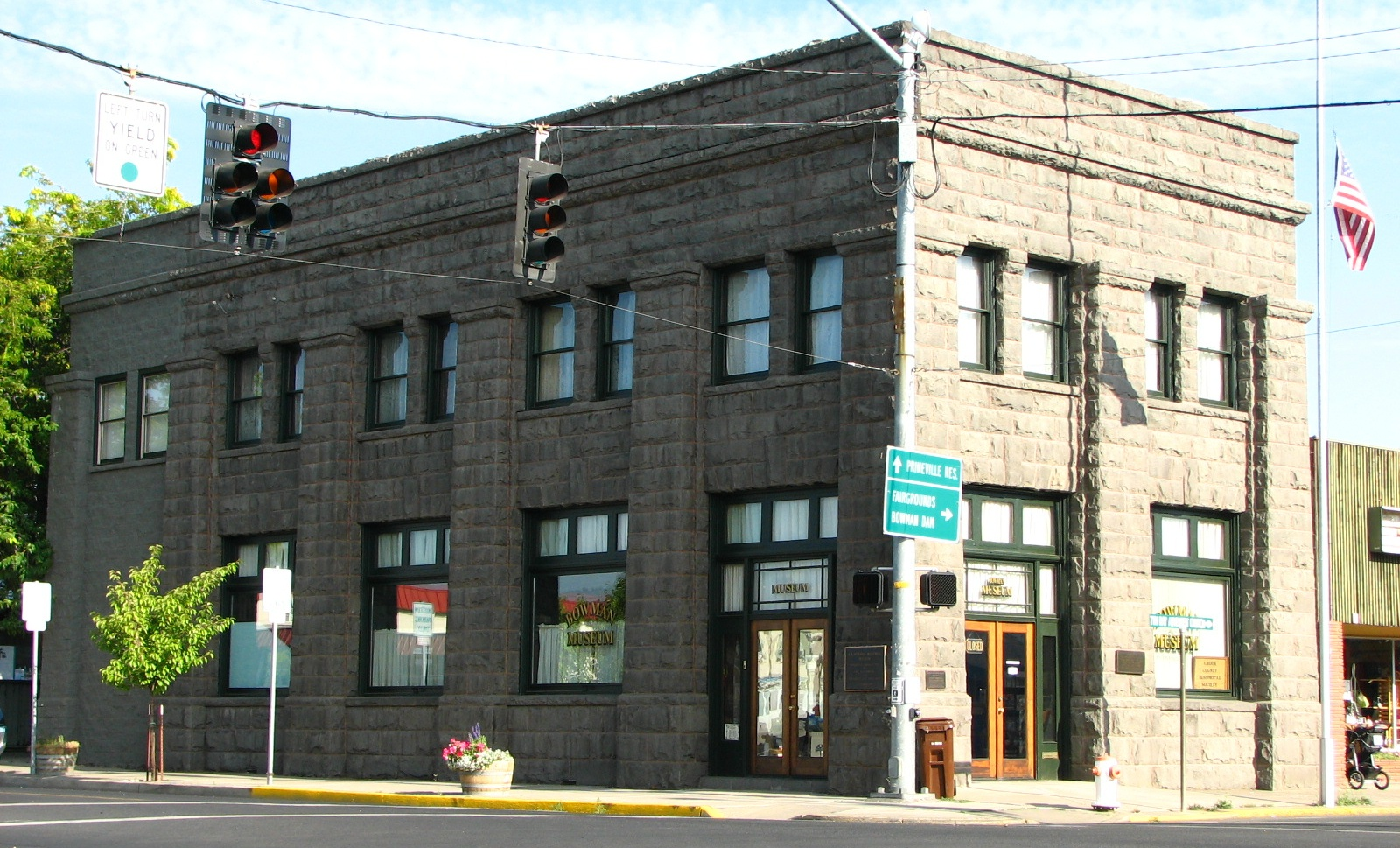
- Old Crook County Bank building
- Established: 1971
- Location: Prineville, Oregon, U.S.A.
- Type: Oregon history
- Director: Sandy Cohen
- Curator: Crook County Historical Society
- Website: www.bowmanmuseum.org

The A. R. Bowman Memorial Museum is a local history museum in Prineville, Oregon, United States. Opened in 1971, the museum is housed in the old Crook County Bank Building which is listed on the National Register of Historic Places. The museum is run by the Crook County Historical Society and highlights the history of Crook County and central Oregon. Its collection includes many original pioneer artifacts, a large railroad exhibit, ranching and timber industry displays, furniture, garments, and historic photographs. The museum also has a research library.

== Arthur Bowman ==
The museum is named after Arthur Ray Bowman, a Prineville businessman and civic leader. Bowman was born in Kansas and came to Prineville in 1910 after receiving a law degree from the University of Washington. He established a successful title and insurance company in Prineville the county seat of Crook County. Bowman was active in civic affairs throughout his life. He served as the County Judge for Crook County from 1936 to 1942. He also helped establish the Ochoco Irrigation District and the Prineville Airport. Bowman helped bring U.S. Highway 26 through Crook County. He was particularly interested in the construction of the Prineville Dam on the Crooked River. Because of his dedication to the project, the dam was renamed the Arthur R. Bowman Dam in his honor. He died in 1970, leaving a legacy of business success and civic responsibility.

In 1971, Bowman's wife and two daughters donated the Crook County Bank building to Crook County for use as a museum. At that time, the Crook County Historical Society assumed the responsibility of operating the A. R. Bowman Memorial Museum through a contractual agreement with Crook County.

== Historic building ==
The museum is housed in the historic Crook County Bank building. The building was constructed in 1910. It is a two-story Romanesque style building constructed using stone blocks from a local quarry located west of the Ochoco Viewpoint. This is the same quarry that provided the stone used to build the Crook County Courthouse in 1909.

The building's interior has not significantly changed since it was a community bank. The first floor still has the bank's original bronze teller cages, marble counter tops, etched art-glass, gilt and alabaster chandeliers, and the mahogany paneling that were the trappings of a prestigious banking institution in the first half of the 20th century.

The building was first occupied by the Crook County Bank. When the Crook County Bank left in 1923, it was replaced by the Bank of Prineville and later the Prineville National Bank. When that bank became insolvent during the Great Depression, the building was purchased by A. R. Bowman for his title and insurance business. Bowman used the building for his various businesses from 1935 until his death in 1970.

The bank is an excellent example of Prineville's early 20th century development. Because of its unique architecture and importance to the history of Prineville, the Crook County Bank Building was listed on the National Register of Historic Places on 19 June 1991.

== Museum exhibits ==
The museum is run by the Crook County Historical Society and highlights the history of Crook County and central Oregon. The building's original bank interior has been maintained and is utilized in the museum's floor plan. There are major sections on local industry, transportation, and military history.

On the first floor is the Hall of History, which highlights Crook County's past. This includes exhibits on the City of Prineville Railroad, the local timber industry and United States Forest Service as well as pioneer furniture, garments, tools, and other artifacts. There are also many photographs of Crook County people, local landmarks, and historic event. The museum's displays include the bank's original teller cages with their marble counters and elegant mahogany woodwork. Museum visitors can look inside the bank's safe and see old ledgers and other documents on display.

The second floor rooms include a ranch tack room, an old-time bedroom, a dining room, a re-creation of the old Paulina store and post office, and exhibits of early medical and dental equipment. The museum's research library is also located on the second floor. The museum's research room contains approximately 700 reference books on Oregon history. Researchers can investigate the local timber industry, the Crook County range war between cattlemen and sheepherders, the Lost Meek Wagon Train, and many other subjects. The museum's gift shop has books on local history as well as souvenirs.

In 1980, the Crook County Historical Society was offered a 1907 Studebaker Phaeton along with some old farm equipment. However, there was no place in the museum to house the vehicle and the large artifacts. As a result, the Society established a building fund to raise money for another building. In 1987, a museum annex was constructed at the Crook County fairgrounds. The building is owned by Crook County, but is operated by the Crook County Historical Society in the same manner as the main Bowman Museum.

In 1996, the Bowman Museum hosted a Smithsonian traveling exhibit called Barn Again. That was the first time a traveling Smithsonian exhibit was shown in central Oregon. In 1997, the museum was awarded a general operating support grant from the Institute of Museum and Library Services, an independent agency of the United States Federal Government. That was a significant achievement since less than 20 percent of more than 1,000 institutional applicants received one of the Institute's competitive national grants.

== Visiting ==
The A.R. Bowman Memorial Museum is located on the southeast corner of Third and Main Street in Prineville. The museum is open year around. From Memorial Day through Labor Day, the museum is open every day. The rest of the year, the museum is open five days a week, Tuesday through Saturday, The operating hour are normally from mid-morning until late afternoon.
