= St. Paul's Church (Lynchburg, Virginia) =

Historic church in Virginia, United States

- U.S. National Register of Historic Places
- U.S. Historic district – Contributing property
- Virginia Landmarks Register
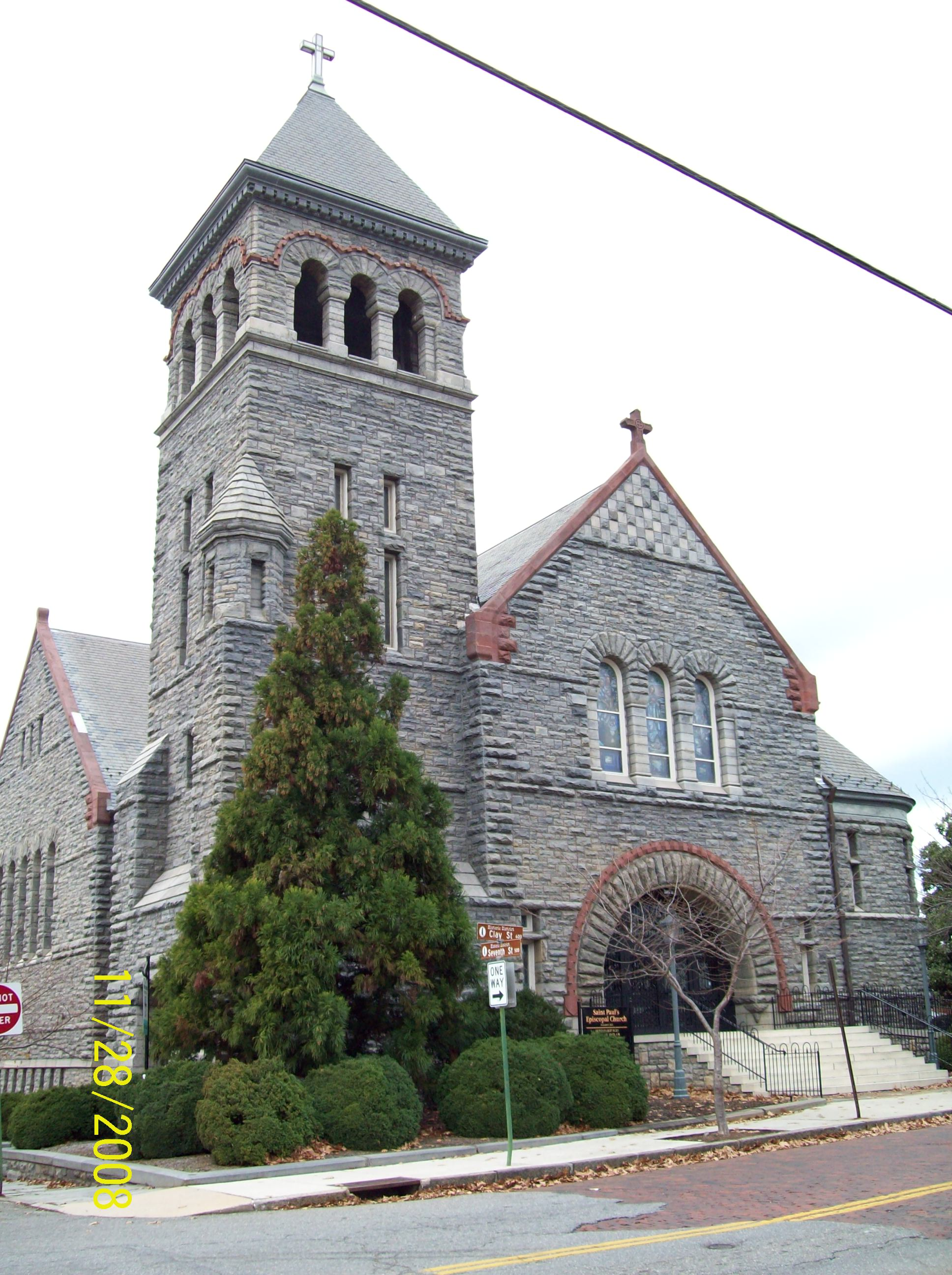
- St. Paul's Church, Lynchburg VA, November 2008

- Location within Virginia Location within the United States
- Location: 605 Clay St., Lynchburg, Virginia
- Coordinates: 37°24′54″N 79°8′51″W
- Area: 1 acre (0.40 ha)
- Built: 1891
- Architect: Frank Miles Day
- Architectural style: Richardsonian Romanesque
- NRHP reference No.: 82004572
- VLR No.: 118-0196

Significant dates
- Added to NRHP: September 9, 1982
- Designated VLR: April 21, 1981

St. Paul's Church is a historic Episcopal church in Lynchburg, Virginia, United States.

== History ==
Lynchburg's oldest Episcopal parish was established in 1822. A replacement building was constructed in 1852, which Vermont schoolteacher turned local businessman and vestryman Elijah Fletcher helped fund. By then, Fletcher had moved his principal residence back to Amherst, Virginia, and helped found Ascension Episcopal Church there, although he conducted business and owned property in both the village and city. After his death and the American Civil War, one of his daughters, Indiana Fletcher Williams, would marry Episcopal priest J. Henry Williams of New York, and after the death of their only child, Daisy, and (though her last will and testament) found Sweet Briar College (incorporated in 1901 and on whose board successive rectors of this parish sat).

The current building was planned in 1888, cornerstone laid on May 26, 1891, first service held in the still-unfinished building the week before Christmas 1895. It is on a different lot from the 1852 building, which by then was considered too small. The architect, Frank Miles Day of Philadelphia, would later become known for his collegiate Gothic designs on the campuses of Princeton University, the University of Pennsylvania, Yale University and Wellesley College. The belfry was added in 1912, pursuant to plans submitted by a local architectural firm, Lewis & Burnham, although not in the original Day plans. The same firm built a parish house at the same time. Although local tradition attributes the stained glass windows to Louis Tiffany, and they are of that school, no documentation supporting that attribution has yet been found.

In the 1960s, the parish bought the adjacent Carter Glass house for use as a parish house, the previous parish house being too small.

During remodeling in 1970s, the organ and choir were moved to the rear balcony and most chancel furniture removed.

== Architecture ==
The building is of Richardsonian Romanesque design and constructed of gray granite (quarried in southwest Virginia), and trimmed with brownstone. A belfry was added in . Connected to the main sanctuary is the parish house, built in 1912.

It was listed on the National Register of Historic Places in 1982. It is located in the Court House Hill-Downtown Historic District.

== Gallery ==
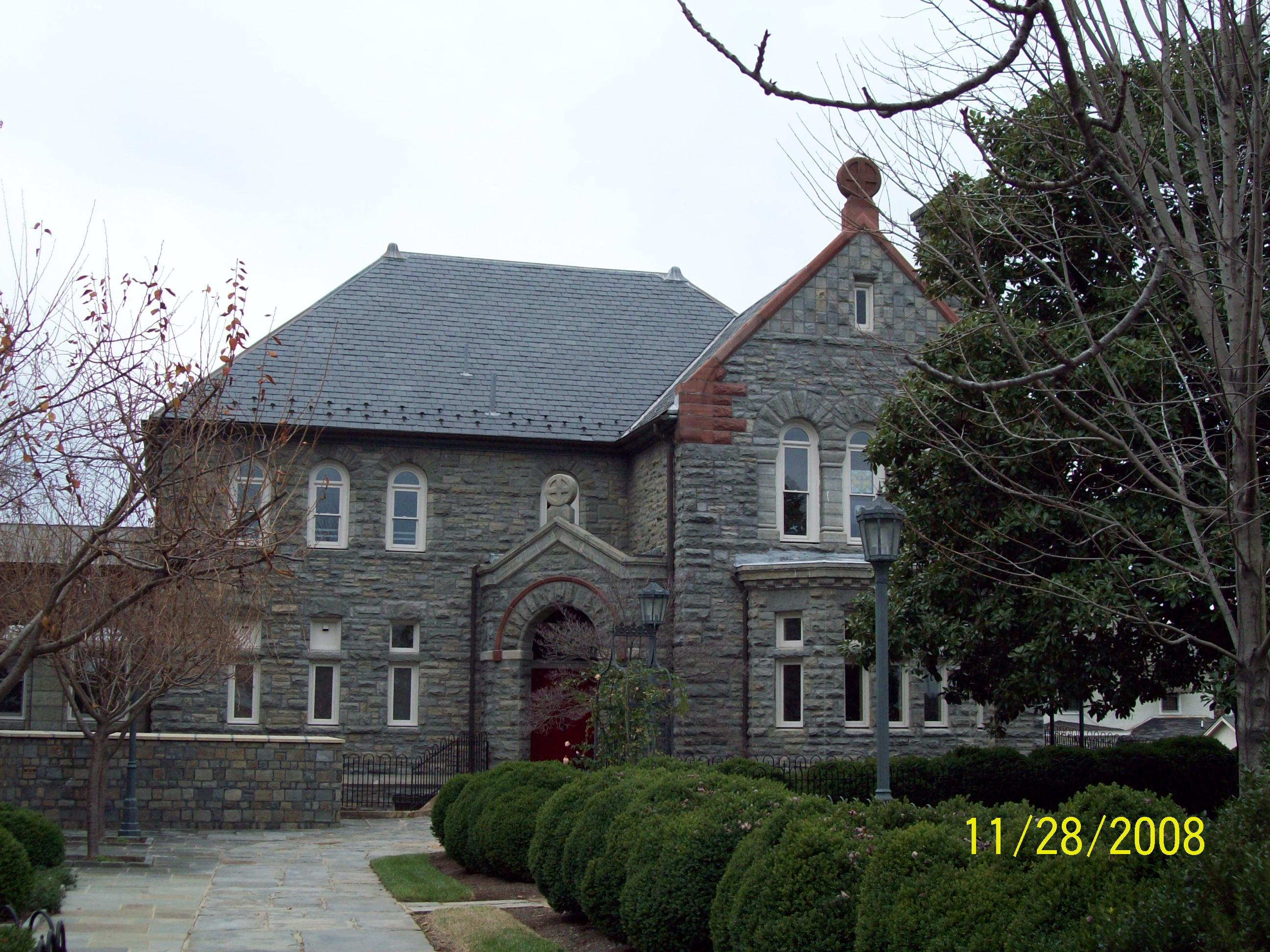
St. Paul's Parish House, Lynchburg VA, November 2008
