= Crook County Bank Building =

- U.S. National Register of Historic Places
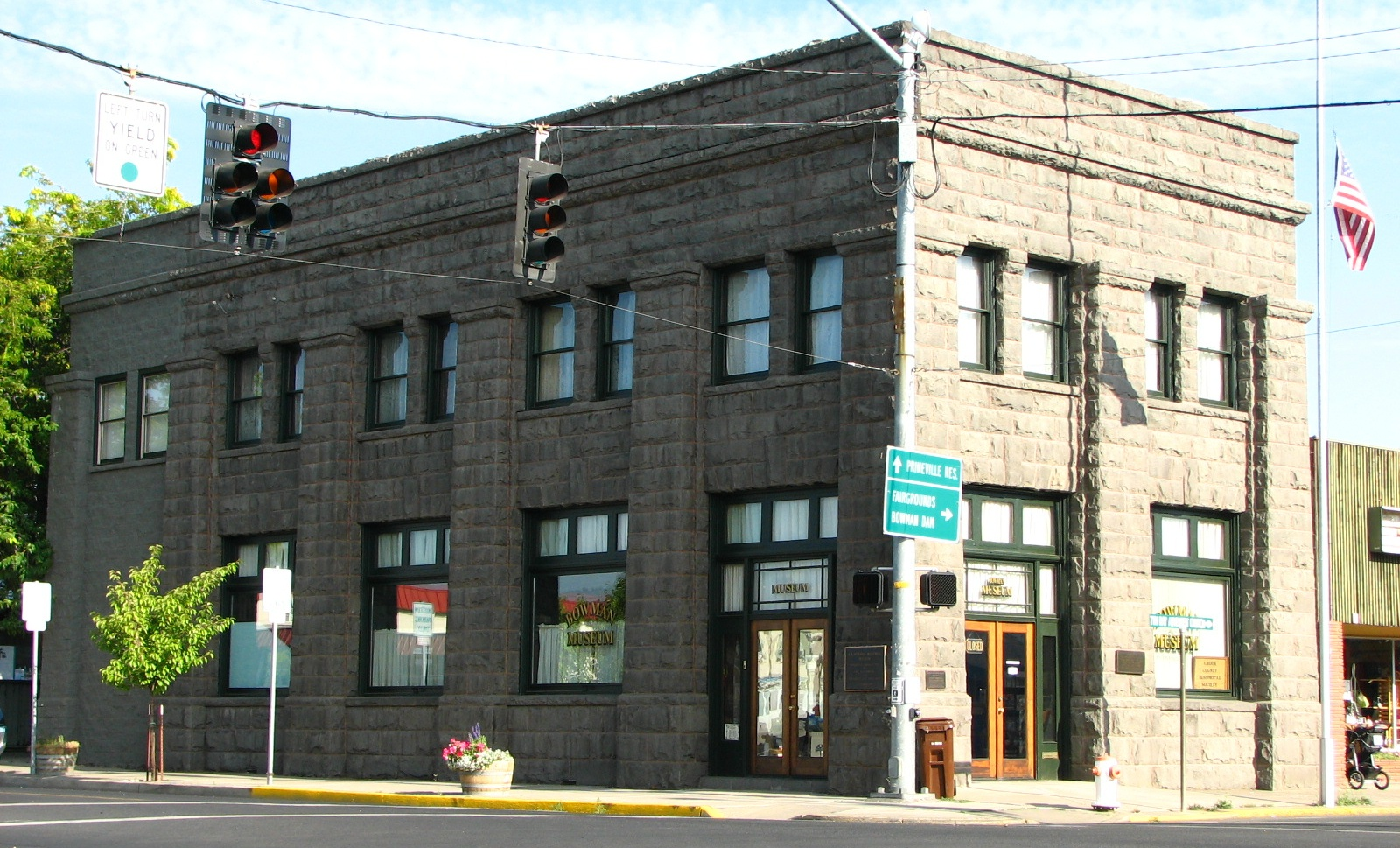
- Home of the Bowman Museum
- Location: 246 North Main Street, Prineville, Oregon
- Coordinates: 44°18′10″N 120°50′49″W
- Built: 1910
- Architectural style: Romanesque
- NRHP reference No.: 91000802
- Added to NRHP: June 19, 1991

The Crook County Bank is a historic bank building in Prineville, Oregon, United States. It was built in 1910 using stone blocks from a local quarry. The building was first used as a bank and then occupied by a title and insurance business until 1971, when ownership was transferred to Crook County for use as a local history museum. Today, the Crook County Bank building is the home of the A. R. Bowman Memorial Museum. Because of its importance to the history of Prineville, the Crook County Bank Building is listed on the National Register of Historic Places.

== History ==
The Crook County Bank Building was built in 1910 and opened in 1911. It was the home of three different banks. It was first occupied by the Crook County Bank. When the Crook County Bank left in 1923, it was replaced by the Bank of Prineville and later the Prineville National Bank. When that bank became insolvent during the Great Depression, the building was purchased by A. R. Bowman for his title and insurance business. Bowman used the building for his various businesses from 1935 until his death in 1970.

In 1971, Bowman's wife and their two daughters donated the Crook County Bank Building to Crook County for use as a museum. The Crook County Historical Society assumed the responsibility of operating the A. R. Bowman Memorial Museum through a contractual agreement with the county government. Initially, the museum was run by volunteers, with the county paying for utilities. In 1976, 1988 and again in 1998, Crook County voters approved tax levies that helped cover the cost of the museum staff salaries, utilities, insurance, maintenance, and capital investments. This help the museum finance a major building renovation in the 1992. In 2000, the Crook County Historical Society received a grant from Oregon's State Historic Preservation Office to re-roof the old Crook County Bank building.

The bank is an excellent example of Prineville's early 20th century development. Because of its unique architecture and its importance to the history of Prineville, the Crook County Bank Building was listed on the National Register of Historic Places on 19 June 1991.

== Structure ==
The Crook County Bank is located on the southeast corner of Third and Main Street in Prineville, Oregon. It is a two-story Romanesque-style building. It was constructed in 1910 using stone blocks from a local quarry located west of the Ochoco Viewpoint. This is the same quarry that provided the stone used to build the Crook County Courthouse in 1909.

After acquiring the building, the Crook County Historical Society constructed a new staircase to the second floor, replacing an old wooden stairs on the east end of the building. However, the building's interior has not significantly changed since it was a community bank. The first floor still has the bank's original bronze teller cages, marble counter tops, etched art-glass, gilt and alabaster chandeliers, and the mahogany paneling that were the trappings of a prestigious banking institution in the first half of the twentieth century.

== Bowman Museum ==
Today, the old Crook County Bank building houses the A. R. Bowman Memorial Museum. The museum is run buy the Crook County Historical Society and highlights the history of Crook County and central Oregon. The building's original interior has been maintained and is utilized in the museum's floor plan. There are major sections on the City of Prineville Railroad, the local timber industry, and military history. Other exhibits include furniture, garments, photographs, and pioneer artifacts. The museum's research room contains approximately 700 reference books on Oregon history. Researchers can investigate pioneer history, the growth of local industries, and many other subjects. The museum's gift shop has books on local history as well as souvenirs.
