= Maier Museum of Art =

Art museum at Randolph College in Lynchburg, Virginia

- Location: Lynchburg, Virginia
- Coordinates: 37.43919°N 79.16992°W
- Website: maiermuseum.org

Maier Museum of Art at Randolph College features works by American artists from the 19th through 21st centuries. Randolph College (founded as Randolph-Macon Woman's College) has been collecting American art since 1907 and the Maier Museum of Art now houses its collection of several thousand American paintings, prints, drawings, and photographs from the 19th and 21st centuries.

The Maier hosts an active schedule of special exhibitions and education programs throughout the year.

== History ==
Randolph-Macon Woman's College, was founded by William Waugh Smith. In 1916, it became the first independent woman's college in the South granted a Phi Beta Kappa chapter. Smith gained support for the college from the Rivermont Land Company who donated 20 acres of land in what is now the city Lynchburg, Virginia. Smith raised $100,000 from 150 local residents and founded the College on March 10, 1891, welcoming the first class in 1893 with 36 students and 12 professors. The art collection was established when, in their Senior year, the Class of 1907 commissioned William Meritt Chase to paint the portrait of William Waugh Smith, the first president of Randolph-Macon Woman's College (now Randolph College).

In 1911, Louise Jordan Smith, the college's first professor of art, established an annual exhibition of contemporary art. Since then, the college has built its collection by purchasing at least one work of art from these annual exhibitions.

In 2007, Randolph–Macon Woman's College became co-ed and was renamed Randolph College.

== Annual Exhibition of Contemporary Art ==
An early champion of American Art, the college's first professor of art, Louise Jordan Smith, realized that while she couldn't take her students to New York, she could bring art to them. To this end, in 1911, Louise Jordan Smith established an annual exhibition of Contemporary Art on campus. Since then, the college's art collection has grown through acquisitions from the series of exhibitions, including works by Winslow Homer, Gilbert Stewart, Mary Cassatt, Milton Avery, Georgia O’Keeffe, Edward Hopper, Faith Ringgold, and Betye Saar.

From October 19 - November 9, 1986, the then Director, Ellen Schall, curated the exhibition "Tour of America." A traveling exhibition featuring works by three contemporary woman artists under the collective name "Abstract 3" : Leny Aardse-Scholten (Dutch), Sheila Reid (American), and Mariette Teisserenc (French). The exhibition focused on contemporary abstraction, with each artist bringing a distinct national and personal perspective. After closing at the Maier the exhibition traveled to other venues, most notably Philadelphia's Nexus/Foundation for Today's Art.^{,}

== Project Y ==
In 1951, the National Gallery of Art established a secret emergency repository (code named "Project Y") for its distinguished collection of art on the campus of Randolph-Macon Woman's College (now Randolph College). The specially designed reinforced concrete building, situated at the end of Quinlan Street, was built for use in the event of national crisis during the Cold War. In exchange for ownership and use of the facility, the college made it available to the National Gallery for 50 years for emergency purposes. The A. W. Mellon Educational and Charitable Trust financed its construction. The structure was finished in the spring of 1952 costing under $250,000 to build and was simply called “the art gallery.” A pre-staged convoy of trucks in the National Gallery of Art's garage stood at the ready to evacuate its masterpieces to the facility which included a fully stocked, three-bedroom cottage for the gallery's curator.

In the mid-1970s, the college was granted permission by the National Gallery of Art to renovate the space to make it more practical, attractive and comfortable for the students, faculty and the public. The renovations were funded by the National Endowment for the Arts. After subsequent renovations in 1981-82 and the establishment of an endowment in 1983, funded by the Sarah and Pauline Maier Scholarship Foundation, the name was changed The Maier Museum of Art.

== Art controversies ==
In 2007, Randolph College announced that it would sell four paintings from its collection. The announcement resulted in an injunction filed to stop the sales as well as protests from art associations, including the Virginia Association of Museums, the Association of Art Museum Directors and the College Art Association. The lawsuit was dropped.

In 2008, the college sold Rufino Tamayo's Trovador (alternatively known as The Troubadour) for a record-breaking $7.2 million. In 2013, Randolph College entered into an agreement with the National Gallery, London for the purchase of George Wesley Bellows' Men of the Docks, for $25.5 million and established an academic partnership between the two institutions. The other paintings sold at a later date are Edward Hicks' Peaceable Kingdom, and Ernest Hennings' Through the Arroyo (which remains on campus through a loan).

In the spring of 2011, Randolph College was censured by the Association of Art Museum Directors (AAMD), of which Randolph College is not nor has ever been a member, for deaccessioning the four artworks from its collection. The college responded by asserting that its art collection is a college asset held for the purpose of enhancing student learning. In 2014, the AAMD issued sanctions forbidding its member institutions from loaning artwork to or otherwise collaborating with the Maier Museum of Art at Randolph College. The censure has sparked discussion over the differences between standalone museums and collections held by private non-profit entities like colleges and universities.
