= Georgia Weston Morgan =

American painter

- Born: December 18, 1869
- Died: December 4, 1951 (aged 81)
- Known for: Painting

Georgia Weston Morgan (December 18, 1869 – December 4, 1951) was an American painter.

== Early life ==
Born in Campbell County, Virginia, Morgan was the daughter of Robert Withers Morgan and grew up at the family estate, Centerview, in Lynchburg.

In the 1890s she taught art in the local public schools before in 1895 beginning more formal study in Lynchburg with Bernhard Gutmann. She continued her lessons with Louise Jordan Smith.

In the 1910s and 1920s, She continued living at Centerview with her mother; according to family tradition she used the dependency behind the house as a studio during this time. In 1923, she and her mother's other heirs sold the house out of the family.

== Professional life ==
An alumna of Randolph-Macon Woman's College, she traveled to Paris for study at the Académie Julian. She began her teaching career as an art instructor at Lynchburg College in 1906. She chaired the art department at the same institution from 1915 until 1945; during which time she traveled to Philadelphia and Gloucester, Massachusetts for further study.

Active in civic affairs, Morgan was among the founders of the Lynchburg Civic Art League in 1932; four years later she was among those who worked to establish the Federal Art Gallery in the city, a project of the Works Progress Administration. She also served in other capacities locally, including a stint as vice-president of the Lynchburg Historical Society from 1933 until 1936.

During her career, Morgan was elected to the National Association of Women Painters and Sculptors. As an artist she produced mainly miniatures and landscapes, which she showed in galleries along the East Coast and at the Paris Salon. She had a reputation as a "Bohemian" for much of her life; one student recalled how she could frequently be found covered in paint, and it was noted that she kept her brushes in her hair to ensure she would remember where they were.

== Recognition ==
After her death, she was memorialized in the local press as the "Dean of Lynchburg Artists". She is buried at Lynchburg's Spring Hill Cemetery. A historical marker in Morgan's honor, in front of Centerview, was sponsored by Randolph College and erected under the auspices of the Virginia Department of Historic Resources in 2015; another marker in honor of her father was erected adjacent to it at the same time. In 2018 the Virginia Capitol Foundation announced that Morgan's name would be on the Virginia Women's Monument's glass Wall of Honor.
