= Men of the Docks =

Painting by George Bellows

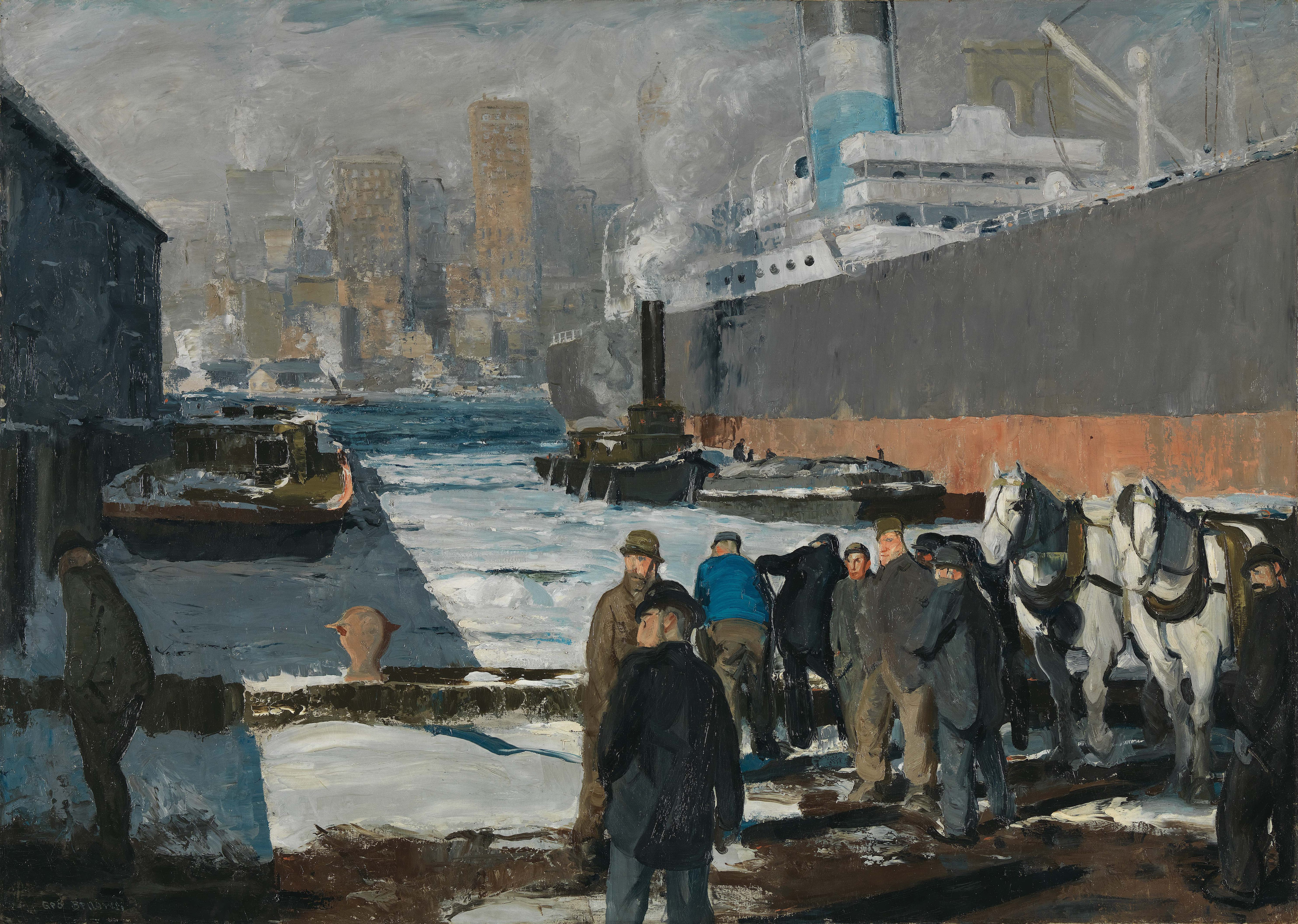
- Artist: George Bellows
- Year: 1912
- Medium: Oil on canvas
- Dimensions: 114.3 cm × 161.3 cm (45.0 in × 63.5 in)
- Location: National Gallery, Room 41, London
- Owner: National Gallery
- Accession: NG6649

Men of the Docks is an oil painting on canvas completed by the American artist George Bellows in 1912. Depicting the docks of New York City, this 114.3-by-161.3-centimetre (45.0 by 63.5 in) painting was sold to the National Gallery in London in 2014 for $25.5 million.

== Description ==
Men of the Docks is a 114.3-by-161.3-centimetre (45.0 by 63.5 in) oil painting on canvas. It depicts a group of men, wearing overcoats smeared in grime, standing at a dock in Brooklyn together with some draft horses. These men appear to be day laborers, at the docks to find work. They look to the left, as if receiving a message, while a large steam liner looms over them to their right. Behind them are a tugboat and the waters and ice floes of the harbor in winter. Further behind them are the skyscrapers of the lower Manhattan skyline. The winter weather about them is bleak and gray.

A writer for The Craftsman considered Men of the Docks to be "free of affectation of soul or technique", presenting a situation of solidity the way a normal man would see it, thus holding onto the scene through reality. However, the art critics Robert W. Snyder and Rebecca Zurier consider the painting to leave viewers in suspense as to the exact nature of the message received by this group of men, whether it is news that no work is available or notice that the men can begin their labor. This tension, they write, paired with the juxtaposition of the skyline and harbor (almost hidden from land), emphasizes the precariousness of the laborers' situation.

== Completion ==
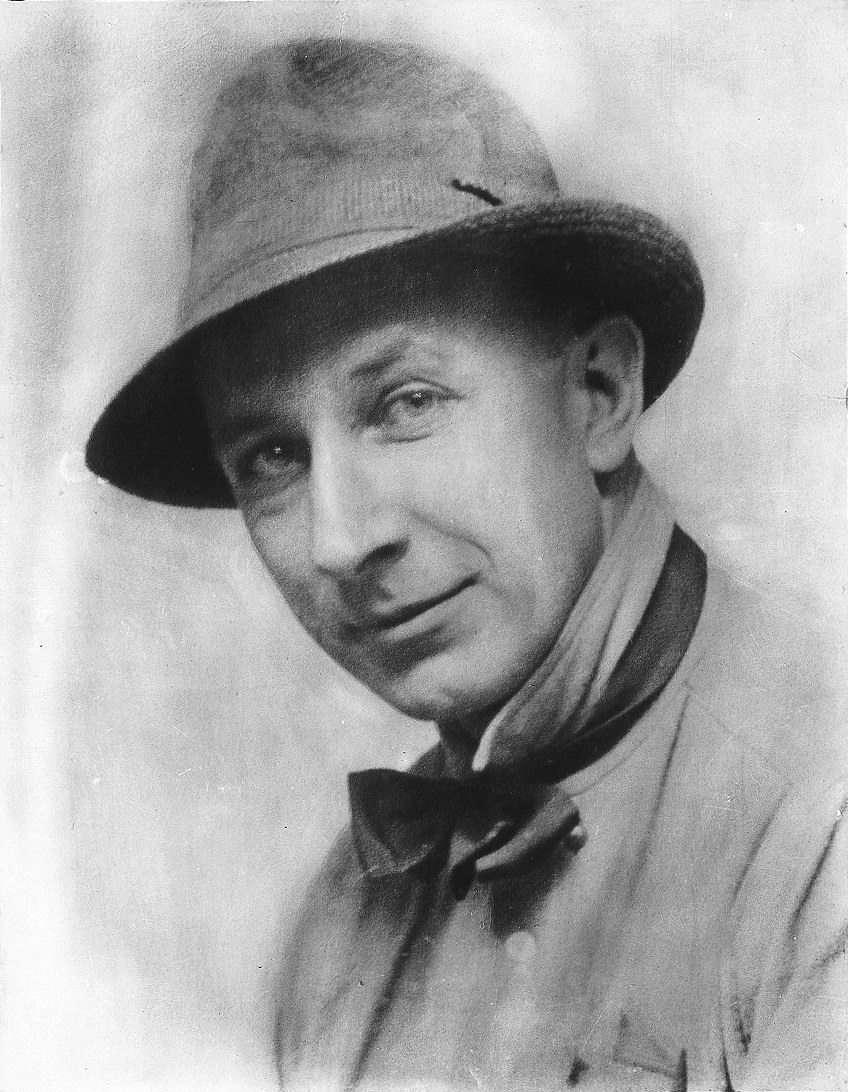
George Bellows, c. 1900

The artist, George Bellows, arrived in New York City in 1904. He completed Men of the Docks in 1912. At the time the Ashcan School, a group of painters who focused on the daily life in New York, was prominent. Bellows, and Men of the Docks, has been considered part of this movement.

In the early 20th century, day laborers in the New York docks worked depending on the availability of ships to unload, and thus when not working they often stood nearby, waiting for news that there was work. One interpretation is the man at the lower left is the odd one out. He walks away dejected in a cold shadow. Other men see him and some pity him but that's the way the cookie crumbled. Maybe tomorrow, but today he has to go home and tell the family there's no money today. This subject of men at the New York docks was a common one for Bellows, as well as fellow Ashcan painters such as Everett Shinn. Men of the Docks is the largest example of Bellows' treatment of the subject.

== Provenance ==
Men of the Docks was exhibited at the Vanderbilt Gallery of the National Academy of Design in 1912, as well as Cornell University. Bellows again exhibited the work at the Panama–Pacific International Exposition of 1915, winning a gold medal. The painting was purchased for the Maier Museum of Art at Randolph Macon Woman's College in Lynchburg, Virginia, in 1920; at the time, the college was one of the foremost for women intent on studying art. At the recommendation of Professor Louise Jordan Smith, students and locals raised $2,500 to purchase the work. Beginning with this painting, the Maier collection eventually grew to include 3,500 works.

After the 1980s, Randolph College faced decreasing enrollment and financial difficulties. As such, in 2007 it decided to sell four of its works – including Men of the Docks. All of these works were taken from the Maier Museum in late 2007. Bellows' painting was scheduled to be auctioned at Christie's in New York, and expected to sell for $25–35 million. This would have been a record for an American painting sold at auction. However, this prospective sale faced controversy at the college. Students made "Missing" posters overlaid showing photocopies of Men of the Docks and the three other paintings which were to be sold.

A lawsuit against the sale continued over the next several years, with detractors including the Association of Academic Museums and Galleries, the College Art Association, and the Association of Art Museum Directors. As the art market deflated, a Virginia judge blocked the sale in November 2007, but in March 2008 opponents of the sale had to drop their suit as they were unable to post the $1 million bond required of them. In 2012 the painting was lent to the National Gallery of Art in Washington, D.C., to be included in a comprehensive exhibition of Bellow's career. This exhibition later continued on to the Metropolitan Museum of Art in New York City, and the Royal Academy of Arts in London.

Ultimately, Men of the Docks was bought by the National Gallery in London in February 2014 for a total of $25.5 million (£15.6 million). The money was acquired from a fund established by Sir John Paul Getty. Director Nicholas Penny, said that the painting was a new direction for the gallery, as a non-European painting in a European style. The museum also touted a “new, transatlantic academic partnership, the first of its kind between an American college and a UK gallery” established by the sale, in which curators could lecture at Randolph and students of the college could do their internships at the National Gallery.

In response to the sale, the College Art Association stated that Randolph had "compromised the educational and cultural mission of the museum" by selling art to increase its coffers, rather than to purchase further art. In protest, both the Indianapolis Museum of Art and Tacoma Art Museum cancelled plans to borrow a Georgia O'Keeffe work. College president Bradley W. Bateman defended the sale by saying that the college was "a college, not a museum", and thus not bound to follow guidelines established for museums. He further argued that Randolph's priority was to ensure quality education for its students, and that the $25.5 million for the painting was a "considerable" addition to the college's endowment of $136 million. At the time of the sale, Randolph had already sold another of its works, Rufino Tamayo's Troubador.

Men of the Docks was the first major American painting acquired by the gallery, and the second painting by Bellows to be publicly owned in Europe. After its acquisition, Men of the Docks was hung in Room 43 of the National Gallery, between works by such European artists as Claude Monet and Camille Pissarro. The painting, with the accession number of NG6649, hangs in Room 45 as of December 2014.

== Reception ==
Critic Charles Henry Meltzer, reviewing after the National Academy exhibition, described Men of the Docks as "irritating ... yet full of talent" owing to its "deliberate carelessness" in the drawing of the crowd, which he found to have character. The writer for The Craftsman found the painting to be "an important painting of the year", "a freshly painted canvas ... presented with the thrill and wonder inherent in the edges of great seaport towns".

Marc Porter of Christie's described Men of the Docks as "the definitive essay on the U.S. in the first half of the 20th century. It’s big, brawny, tough." Alan Franham of Forbes called it "a class by itself", noting that, as opposed to the work's value of millions of dollars, prints by the artist could be bought for $50,000. The curator Christopher Riopelle considers the painting to "evoke something of the raw and unbeautiful energy of the urban experience in what was at the time one of the world's fastest-growing cities" through its "wilful awkwardness and brutality".

== See also ==
- List of works by George Wesley Bellows
