= Centerview (disambiguation) =

Centerview may refer to:

== Places ==
- Centerview, Kansas, an unincorporated community in Edwards County
- Centerview (Lynchburg, Virginia), a historic home
- Centerview, Missouri, a city in Johnson County

== Other ==
- Centerview Partners, an independent investment banking and private equity investment firm
