= Larissa Salmina-Haskell =

Russian art historian, curator and translator

- Born: Larissa Salmina; 1931
- Died: 28 April 2024 (aged 92–93)
- Education: Leningrad Academy of Fine Arts
- Occupations: Art historian, curator, translator
- Spouse: Francis Haskell (married 1965)

Larissa Salmina-Haskell (née Salmina; 1931 – 28 April 2024) was a Russian art historian, curator, and translator. She was a noted historian of Venetian art and "a great scholar".

== Life ==
Larissa Salmina was born in Russia in 1931, the daughter of a Soviet army officer from a noble family. She graduated from the Leningrad Academy of Fine Arts in 1954, three years later becoming curator of Italian drawings at the Hermitage Museum.

Salmina married art historian Francis Haskell in Leningrad in 1965, having met him in 1962 while working as commissar at the Venice Biennale. She moved to England to live with him. They were described as being "inseparable" for the remainder of Francis Haskell's life. The Times wrote that the couple "seemed to be familiar with every museum and monument in Europe and America, and their house in Oxford became the heart of an international network of personal and professional friendships".

In 1970, Salmina-Haskell published Russian Paintings and Drawings in the Ashmolean Museum, which was republished in 1989.

She assisted Richard Buckle with a biography of Serge Diaghilev, lending translation support and art history context. She also helped with works on other Russian figures such as Anatole Demidoff, and works including Isaiah Berlin's The Soviet Mind: Russian Culture Under Communism.

== Select bibliography ==
- G.B Tiepolo: Life and Work (Leningrad, 1963)
- 'Two Drawings by Francesco Vanni' in The Burlington Magazine, Vol. 109, No. 775 (October 1967)
- Russian Paintings and Drawings in the Ashmolean Museum (Oxford: Ashmolean Museum, 1970)
- 'Venetian Drawings at the Heim Gallery' in The Burlington Magazine, Vol. 114, No. 828 (March 1972)
- Russian Drawings in the Victoria and Albert Museum (Oxford Slavonic Papers, 1972)
- 'St. Petersburg in Oxford' in Oxford Art Journal, Volume 1, Issue 1 (1 March 1978)
- 'A Scandinavian Printmaker in Russia' in Print Quarterly, Vol. 3, No. 1 (March 1986)
- Panoramic Views of St. Petersburg from 1716-1835 (Oxford: Ashmolean Museum, 1993)
