= Celestia Susannah Parrish =

American educator and psychologist (1853–1918)

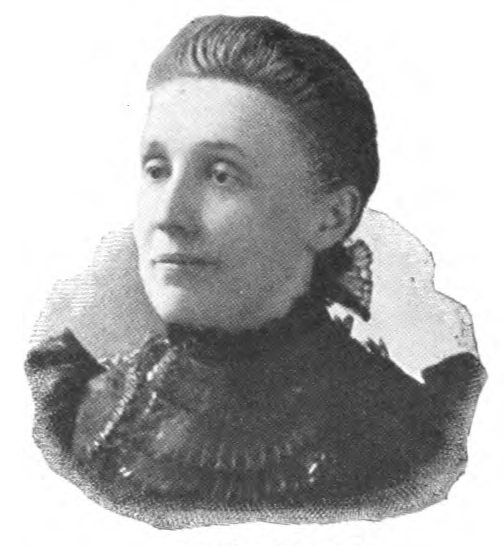
- Parrish circa 1898
- Born: September 12, 1853; Pittsylvania County, Virginia, United States
- Died: September 7, 1918 (aged 64); Clayton, Georgia, US
- Scientific career
- Fields: Psychology
- Workplaces: Longwood University; Randolph-Macon Woman's College; State Normal School
- Doctoral advisor: E. B. Titchener

Celestia Susannah Parrish (September 12, 1853 – September 7, 1918) was an American educator.

== Life and career ==
She was born the daughter of a plantation owner, William Perkins Parrish (1816-1863), and Lucinda Jane Walker (1828-1863), on September 12, 1853, in Pittsylvania County, Virginia. Her father was a plantation owner of moderate wealth and position. He supported her intellectual ambitions. At age 5 she attended a private school on the plantation. Her parents died during the Civil War leaving her, her younger brother, and her sister to live with their uncle and two aunts. She was orphaned by age 10 and was taken under the care of relatives until her uncle's death five years later. Her uncle disapproved of girls receiving an education so she read all the books in her aunt's library. In 1865 she attended a private school in Callands, Virginia. At that point, she took up a job as a community schoolteacher to support her younger brother and her sister but struggled with her early teaching experiences.

In 1874, after Parrish's guardian uncle died and her aunts refused to support her and her siblings, she accepted a position as a teacher in Danville, Virginia which allowed her to begin taking classes at Roanoke Female College with her younger sister. She taught from 1871 to 1875. In 1876, she graduated but went on to take two more years of schooling at the Virginia State Normal School, now Longwood University, in Farmville Virginia.

In 1892, Parrish was offered a position at the newly opened Randolph-Macon Woman's College in Lynchburg, Virginia as the chair of mathematics. Under this position, she was also responsible for philosophy, pedagogy, and psychology. In order to gain a better understanding of the field of psychology, she enrolled in a summer session at Cornell University in Ithaca, New York to study under the famous American psychologist E. B. Titchener. Although Titchener is known as a rigid sexist (no women were permitted to join his Society for Experimental Psychology), he did accept a number of female graduate students, including Parrish.

After Parrish returned to Randolph-Macon, Titchener initially refused to do any correspondence work with her. She begged him to change his mind, urging him that "you must help me. A man who sits down to the rich feasts which are spread before you has no right to deny a few crumbs to a poor starveling like me (Parrish, 1925, p. 3)." Titchener relented and the two eventually became good friends.

== Writings ==
Her efforts were rewarded when she achieved a publication in 1895 in The American Journal of Psychology with Titchener titled "Minor studies from the psychological laboratory of Cornell university: VII the cutaneous estimation of open and filled spaces". This study had seven subjects, two of which were Mr. and Mrs. Titchener.

Her second publication with Titchener titled "Minor Studies from the Psychological Laboratory of Cornell University: Localization of cutaneous impressions by arm movement without pressure upon the skin." was also published in The American Journal of Psychology in 1897. This work, largely inspired by Pillsbury and Washburn, added to the relevant information during that time of localization and perception of feeling on the skin.

== Impact and legacy ==
Parrish's work with Titchener inspired her to follow more of an experimental approach in her work. She approached the President of Randolph-Macon for $25 in order to set up a psychology lab in Lynchburg, Virginia. She opened up the what is colloquially known as the "first psychology laboratory in the south".

Parrish stayed at Randolph-Macon until 1902 when she moved to teach at State Normal School of Georgia in Athens. Again, she established a psychology lab at this university, largely donated by George Peabody. She was in charge of the lab and taught courses (some in child psychology) until 1911 when she became the State Supervisor of Schools in Georgia, which she remained as until her death in 1918. As State Supervisor she was in charge of thousands and more than 3,800 teachers. She traveled frequently training teachers and campaigning for money for schools to ensure the best possible education. She traveled to the 2,400 rural schools by buggy and wagon around back roads in all 48 counties of North Georgia.

She died September 7, 1918, in Clayton, Georgia. Her funeral was at Clayton Baptist Church and her monument bears the inscription "Georgia's Greatest Woman" bestowed upon her by the Georgia State Superintendent of Schools. She is buried at the Clayton Baptist Church, Rabun County, Georgia.

== Sources and further reading ==
- Montgomery, Rebecca S. (2018). Celeste Parrish and Educational Reform in the Progressive-Era South. Baton Rouge: Louisiana State University Press. ISBN 9780807169780. OCLC 1099682998 – via Google Books.
- Synnott, Marcia G. (1994). "Celestia Susannah Parrish". In Seller, Maxine S. (ed.). Women Educators in the United States: 1820-1993: A Bio-Bibliographical Sourcebook. Westport, Conn.: Greenwood Press. pp. 359–367. ISBN 9780313279379. OCLC 243794844 – via Google Books.
