= Elsie W. Helmrich =

American college professor

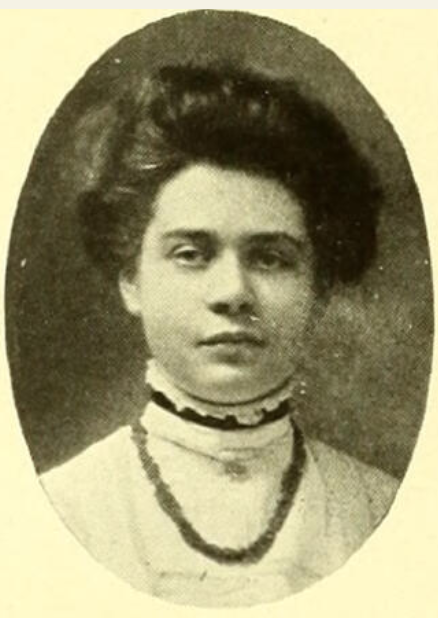
- Helmrich, from the 1908 yearbook of Barnard College
- Born: June 16, 1886; New Rochelle, New York, U.S.
- Died: November 10, 1979 (aged 93); New Rochelle, New York, U.S.
- Occupations: Theatre scholar, professor of German

Elsie Winifred Helmrich (June 16, 1886 – November 10, 1979) was an American professor and scholar of German literature. She was head of the German department at Randolph-Macon Woman's College in Virginia. She wrote, or adapted, and directed the annual German Christmas play on campus from 1924 into the 1950s.

== Early life and education ==
Helmrich was born in New Rochelle, New York, the daughter of George Hubert Helmrich and Anna Maria White Helmrich. She graduated from Barnard College in 1908, earned a master's degree in 1909 and completed doctoral studies at Columbia University in 1912.

== Career ==
Helmrich taught at St. Agnes School in Albany, New York, before earning her doctorate. Also in Albany, she was treasurer of the local chapter of the Consumers' League. She also taught German at Springfield Junior College in Springfield, Massachusetts.

Beginning in 1924, Helmrich was a professor of German language and literature at Randolph-Macon Woman's College. She was chair of the German department and founded and advised the German Club. She led student trips to Germany. She wrote, or adapted, and directed the annual German Christmas play on campus for over thirty years. She retired from Randolph-Macon in 1955.

Helmrich took long study trips to Germany in the 1930s, 1940s, and 1950s. In 1934 she attended the 300th anniversary of the Passion Play at Oberammergau. She attended national conferences of the Modern Language Association. In 1949 she went to Colorado for the International Goethe Convocation, marking the 200th anniversary of Goethe's birth. In 1953, she was guest of honor on a holiday program of the Woman's Press Club of New York City.

== Publications ==
- The History of the Chorus in the German Drama (1912)

== Personal life ==
Helmrich moved back to New Rochelle in retirement, and lived with her sister Esther there. She died in New Rochelle in 1979, at the age of 93.
