= Mariette Teisserenc =

French visual artist, painter and engraver (born 1940)

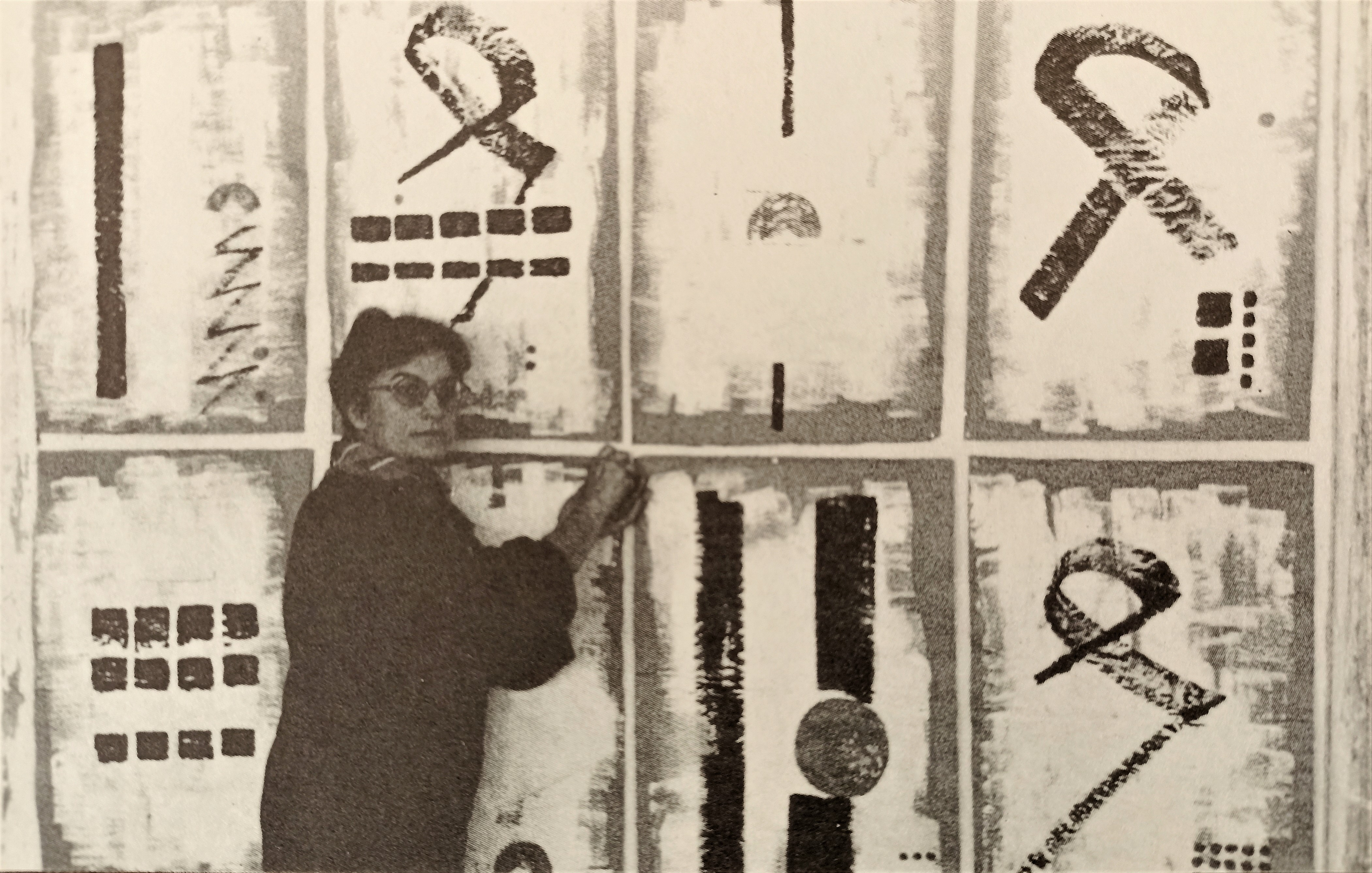
- Mariette Teisserenc in 1987
- Born: Mariette Dessèvre; 5 March 1940; Grand-Couronne (Seine-Maritime), France
- Occupation: Painter
- Spouse: Jacques Teisserenc (m. 1963)

Mariette Teisserenc (born March 3, 1940) is a French visual artist, painter and engraver. She is also known as "Teisse" or "Teisse-Renc".

She was born in Grand-Couronne, Seine-Maritime. Trained as a Graphic designer at Düsseldorf's School of Decorative Arts (1967–1972), she gave up a career in the advertising industry in 1978 to dedicate herself to her artistic practice.

As an abstract painter and advocate for recognition of women artists in France and abroad, she was the President of the French women artists' group "Art et Regard des Femmes".

Her work is characterized by clean shapes, strong lines and the invariable use of the colour black. It expresses tensions between forms and the search for equilibrium.

In 1969, Teisserenc was awarded a Second Prize for Graphic-Design from the company Henkel & Cie GmbH (Düsseldorf, West-Germany). In 1971, she received first prize from the Nordwestdeutsche Austellungsgesellschaft mbH (NOWEA, Messe Düsseldorf). In 1983, she received a silver medal from the Bilan de l'Art Contemporain Foundation (Melun-Almont, France).

In 1996, the Association française d’action artistique (part of the French Foreign Affairs Ministry) and the Ministry for Indigenous Affairs of Quebec awarded her a grant to travel to the Nunavik region and study the use of the ulu, a knife specific to Inuit women. She exhibited the results of her work in 1998 at Riverin-Arlogos Gallery, Eastman, Canada.

Teisserenc was president of the French feminist artists collective Art et regard des femmes.

In 2012, Teisserenc designed the stained glass windows of Saint-Peter and Saint-Paul Church in Brûlon-sur-Sarthe, France.

== Selected exhibitions ==
- 1970: "Rythmen und Kompositionen – Bilder von Mariette Teisserenc und Maïkki Strömberg", General Consulate of France, Düsseldorf, Germany
- 1972: "Jahresausstellung Fachhochschule Düsseldorf", Schloss Benrath, Düsseldorf, Germany
- 1972: "Mòstra Del Larzac" (5th ed.), Les Infruts – La Couvertoirade, France
- 1976: "Mòstra Del Larzac" (9th ed.: "Le Beaubourg d'Occitanie"), Les Infruts – La Couvertoirade, France
- 1978: "Berufsverband Bildender Künstler*innen Berlin" (BBK), Villa Engelhardt, Düsseldorf, Germany
- 1979: "Art et regard des femmes (peintures et sculptures)", Mairie of the 3rd arrondissement of Paris, France
- 1979: "Salon de l'Union des Femmes Peintres et Sculpteurs" (95th ed.), Musée du Luxembourg, Paris, France
- 1981: "Jahresausstellung Düsseldorfer Künstler-Vereinigung", Kunstpalast, Düsseldorf, Germany
- 1982: "International Festival of Woman Artists", Künstlerhaus Bethanien, Berlin, Germany
- 1982: "Salon de la Jeune Peinture" (33rd edition), Grand Palais des Champs-Élysées, Paris, France
- 1983: "Art expo NY" (Fondation Bilan de l’Art contemporain), Coliseum, Columbus Circle, New York City, United States
- 1985: "Expositie: Mariette Teisserenc, Leny Aardse-Scholten, Sheila Reid", Centraal Beheer Kunstgalerij, Apeldoorn, Netherlands
- 1985: "Schilderijen en objecten in gemengde techniek", Stichting Kasteel van Rhoon, Albrandswaard, Netherlands
- 1985: "Paris-couleur-Montréal" (Jeune Peinture), Maison de la culture de Côte-des-Neiges, Montreal, Canada
- 1986: "Tour of America – An Exhibition of Contemporary Art: Sheila Reid, Leny Aardse, Mariette Teisserenc", The Fine Arts Gallery, University of Mississippi, Oxford, Mississippi, United States
- 1986: "Tour of America", Maier Museum of Art, Lynchburg, Virginia, United States
- 1986: "Tour of America", Nexus/Foundation for Today's Art, Philadelphia, Pennsylvania, United States
- 1990: "Kontraste – Mariette Teisserenc (Malerin) und Peter Rübsam (Bildhauer)", Fenster Galerie, Düsseldorf, Germany
- 1993: "International Women Artists Exhibition" (Alliance of Woman Artists), Grand Palais, Paris, France
- 1998: "Retour du Grand Nord, a French artists visiting the Inuit", Riverin-Arlogos Gallery, Eastman, Canada
- 1999: "Ariane-Essor", Petronas Gallery, Kuala Lumpur, Malaysia
- 2003: "Plages: Le numéro 100 de la revue" (art magazine), Weiller Gallery, Paris, France
- 2004: "Silviane Léger et Mariette Teisserenc", Silviane Léger's art studio Tourcoing, Lille, France
- 2015: "Les 30 ans de la Galerie Riverin-Arlogos: Mariette Teisse-Renc, Jean-Michel Correa, Daniel Lacomme", Riverin-Arlogos Gallery, Eastman, Canada
- 2021: "Semaine d’Art Contemporain de Saint-Mandé" (37th ed.), Saint-Mandé, Val-de-Marne, France

== Bibliography ==
- 2001, Lettres d’Afrique du Sud : un livre sur la Paix [South African's Letters: a Book about Peace], Catherine Samet (text) and Mariette Teisserenc (text), Paris V : L’Harmattan, 250 pp. ISBN 2-7475-1442-0.
- 2006, Les Mille et un contes et récits de Tozeur ou L’aventure du Sud Tunisien [The Thousand and One Tales of Tozeur or the South Tunisian Adventure], Catherine Samet (text) and Mariette Teisserenc (text and illustrations), foreword by Moncer Rouissi, Paris V : L’Harmattan, 272 pp. ISBN 2-296-01054-7.
