= Theodore Henley Jack =

American college president (1881–1964)

Theodore Henley Jack (December 30, 1881 - September 20, 1964) was a professor, college administrator, and author. Jack began college at Southern University in Greensboro, Alabama, but he then went to the University of Alabama, where he earned a bachelor’s degree (1902) and a master’s degree (1903). He later studied history and government at Harvard University; he was one of 11 students from the state of Alabama who were enrolled at Harvard during the 1908-1909 academic year. After earning a PhD from the University of Chicago in 1915, he briefly taught at Southern University. However, he quickly left there for a history position at Emory University in 1916, where he also served as dean of the graduate school, dean of the college of liberal arts, and vice president of the university. He left Emory to serve as president of Randolph-Macon Woman’s College from 1933 to 1952.

Emory University has a collection of his papers. The Los Angeles Public Library has his bookplate.

He married Alice Searcy Ashley in 1910. Mary Spencer Jack Craddock (December 12, 1912 - September 2, 2014) was one of their two daughters.

== Writings ==
- Sectionalism and Party Politics in Alabama, 1819-1842, Menasha, Wisconsin: George Banta Pub. Co., 1919
- The Story of America for Young Americans Part 1 by Smith Burnham and Theodore Henley Jack 1932
- America Our Country by Smith Burnham and Theodore Henley Jack 1934
