= Louise Jordan Smith =

American painter

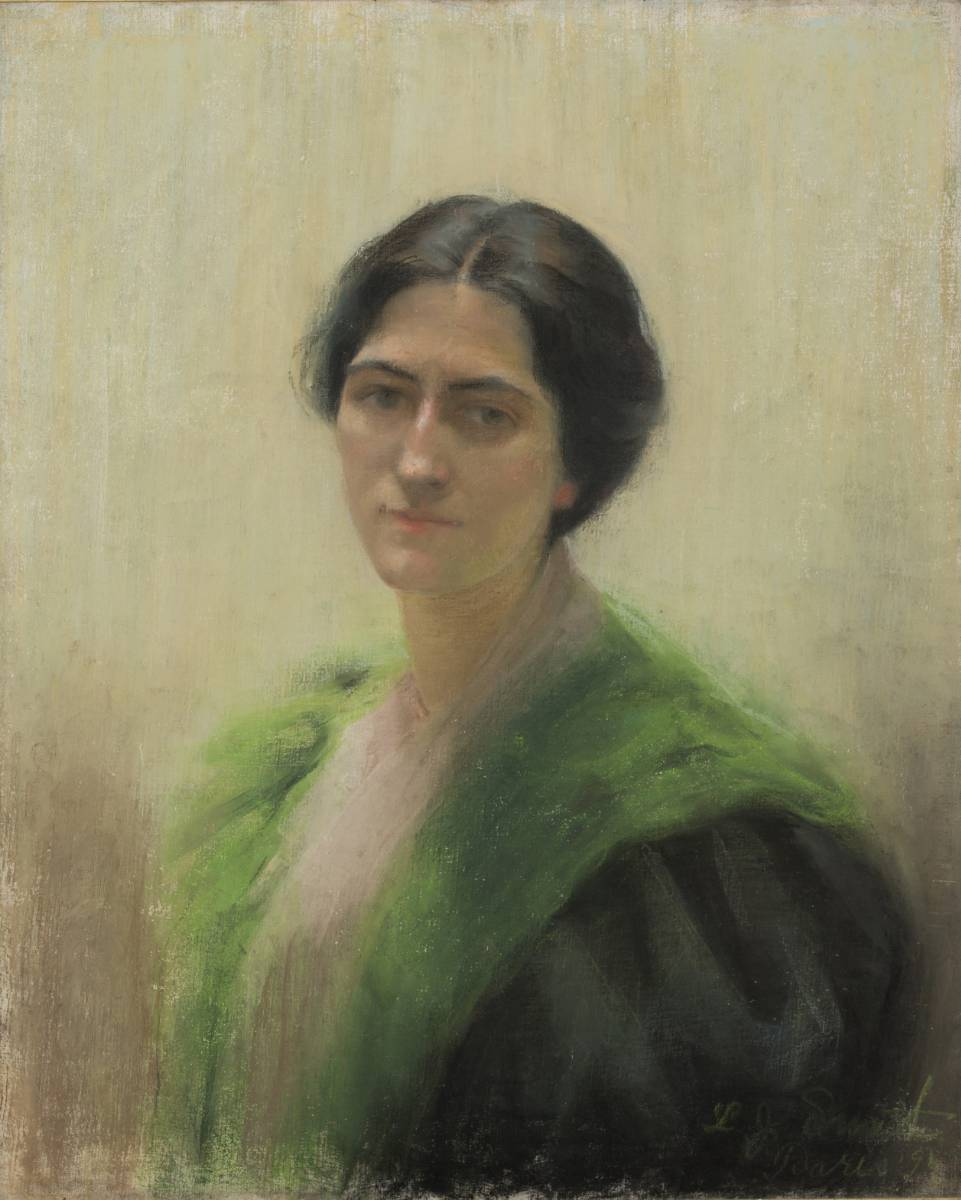
Self-Portrait, 1897, pastel on canvas

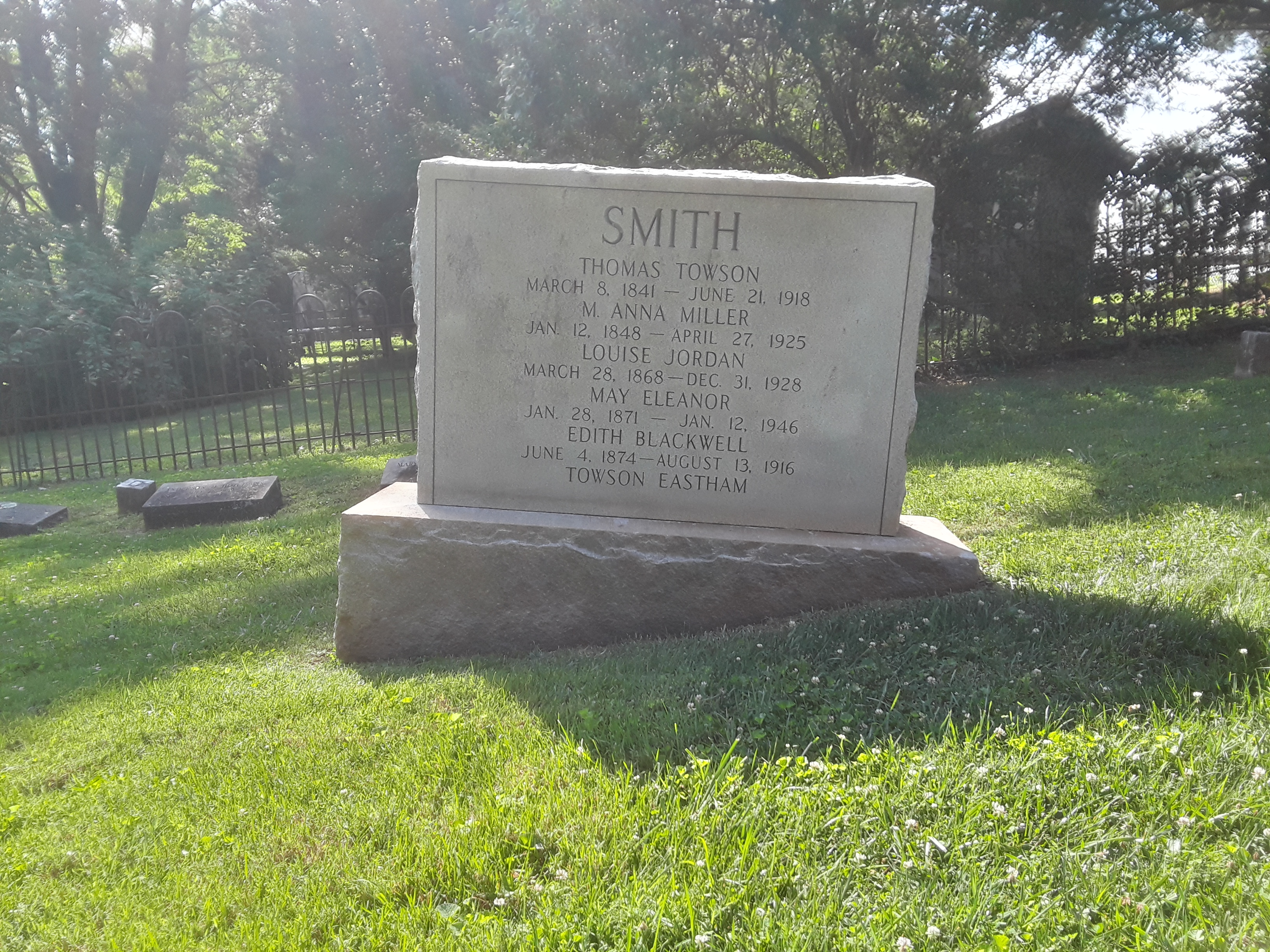
Smith family marker in Warrenton Cemetery, including an entry for Louise Jordan Smith

Louise Jordan Smith (March 28, 1868 – December 31, 1928) was an American painter and academic.

Smith was active as an artist in Lynchburg, Virginia in the late nineteenth and early twentieth centuries. In 1895 she and Bernhard Gutmann founded the Lynchburg Art League. During the 1890s she studied art in Paris for two years, and during that same decade she became chairman of the art department at Randolph-Macon Woman's College. A cousin of the institution's first president, William Waugh Smith, she held that "the only way to develop taste in art is to study paintings frequently, seriously, and at leisure," and it was she who suggested William Merritt Chase as the artist for his formal portrait, presented to the school in 1907 by the senior class of that year. The first art professor on the college's faculty, it was she who instigated the purchase of Men of the Docks by George Bellows in 1920, an event which marked the foundation of the school's Maier Museum of Art. It was also under her direction that the college held its First Annual Exhibition in 1911, believed to be the first exhibition of modern art held on a college campus anywhere in the United States. Furthermore, in 1893 Smith opened her lectures to the women of Lynchburg, which one source claims may have been the first organized system of adult education in Virginia. During her academic career Smith also taught French at the College, and invited prominent artists of her acquaintance to come and speak to the student body. At her death she was buried in the Warrenton Cemetery in Warrenton, Virginia.

Smith's pupils included Georgia Weston Morgan, herself to become a prominent figure in Lynchburg's artistic scene.

In 2018 the Virginia Capitol Foundation announced that Nottingham's name would be included on the Virginia Women's Monument's glass Wall of Honor.
