= Nicholas Penny =

British art historian (born 1949)

Nicholas Penny FBA FSA
- Born: 21 December 1949 (age 76); United Kingdom
- Education: Shrewsbury School
- Alma mater: St Catharine's College, Cambridge; The Courtauld Institute of Art
- Occupation: Art historian
- Employer(s): Clare Hall, Cambridge; Manchester University; Oxford University; King's College, Cambridge; Ashmolean Museum; Balliol College, Oxford; National Gallery; National Gallery of Art
- Spouse: Mary Crettier
- Children: 2

Sir Nicholas Beaver Penny (born 21 December 1949) is a British art historian. From 2008 to 2015 he was director of the National Gallery in London.

== Early life ==
Penny was educated at Shrewsbury School before he studied English at St Catharine's College, Cambridge. He then studied for a doctorate at The Courtauld Institute of Art in London, where he was taught by Michael Kitson. While a student at the Courtauld, Penny contributed photographs to the Art & Architecture section of the Conway Library collection.

== Career ==
Penny's academic career began with a research fellowship at Clare Hall, Cambridge, after which he went on to teach art history at Manchester University. While still in his early thirties, Penny was appointed to the Slade Professorship at Oxford University and to a senior research fellowship at King's College, Cambridge. He was the co-author, with Francis Haskell, of Taste and the Antique, a study of the formation of the canon of classical sculpture published in 1984.

Between 1984 and 1989 Penny was keeper of the department of Western art at the Ashmolean Museum, Oxford and professorial fellow of Balliol College, Oxford. In 1990 he began a long association with the National Gallery, joining the institution as Clore Curator of Renaissance Painting. Shortly afterwards, in 1991, he identified the Madonna of the Pinks belonging to the Duke of Northumberland as a genuine Raphael, and not a copy of a lost original as was previously supposed. The painting came to public prominence in 2002 when the Gallery undertook a major fundraising campaign in order to prevent the painting's sale to the Getty Center in Los Angeles. Earlier that year Penny made an unsuccessful bid for the directorship of the National Gallery, the post going to Charles Saumarez Smith. Again in 2002, Penny was appointed senior curator of sculpture at the National Gallery of Art in Washington, D.C. Following Saumarez Smith's early resignation from his post, Penny was once again a candidate for heading the London National Gallery, and this time he succeeded.

During his time as Director, Penny worked with the National Galleries of Scotland to help secure for the nation two of Titian's paintings: Diana and Actaeon and Diana and Callisto. He also oversaw the Gallery's first major acquisition of an American painting, Men of the Docks by George Bellows. The Gallery broke its record attendance under Penny's leadership, exceeding six million visitors in 2013. In June 2014, Penny announced his retirement from the National Gallery after six years as Director. He retired in 2015, and was appointed a Knight Bachelor in the Queen's 2015 Birthday Honours.

Penny is a regular contributor to The Burlington Magazine and the London Review of Books. He has also published books, exhibition catalogues, and articles on picture frames and Italian Renaissance painting, and on Raphael, Sir Joshua Reynolds, and Richard Payne Knight.

== Personal life ==
Penny is married to Mary Crettier, an American. He has twin daughters from an earlier marriage.

== Bibliography ==
- Church Monuments in Romantic England (Yale University Press, 1977). ISBN 978-0300020755.
- Taste and the Antique: Lure of Classical Sculpture, 1500–1900 (co-author: Francis Haskell, Yale University Press, New Ed. 1982). ISBN 978-0300029130.
- Catalogue of European Sculpture in the Ashmolean Museum, 1540 to the Present Day, 3 vols. (Clarendon Press, 1992). ISBN 978-0199513567.
- The Materials of Sculpture (Yale University Press, new Ed. 1995). ISBN 978-0300065817.

== Sources ==
- Maddocks, Fiona (27 November 2007). "The National Gallery finds the right man". Evening Standard. Archived from the original on 12 January 2009.
- Jones, Jonathan (27 March 2008). "Agent provocateur". The Guardian.
- Higgins, Charlotte (27 March 2008). "Buy old masters, says new National Gallery head". The Guardian.
- 2002 press release from the National Gallery of Art on Penny's appointment as Senior Curator of Sculpture
- Balliol College News mentioning quondam fellowship of the college and appointment to the National Gallery
- Overview of publications

Academic offices
Preceded by J. Mordaunt Crook	Slade Professor of Fine Art, Oxford University; 1980–81	Succeeded by Jonathan Brown
