= Main Hall, Randolph College =

Historic college building in Virginia, US

- U.S. National Register of Historic Places
- Virginia Landmarks Register
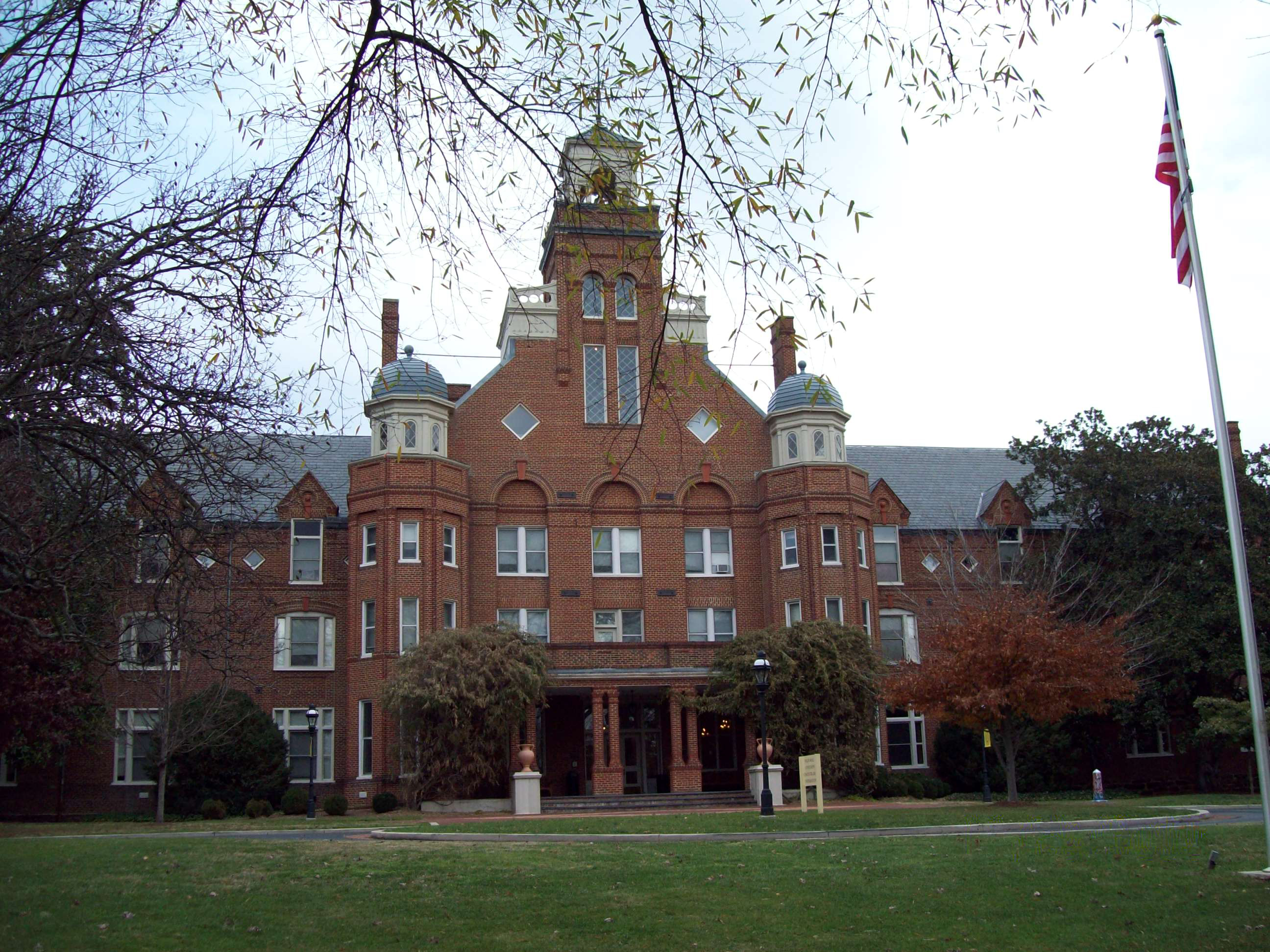

- Location within Virginia Location within the United States
- Location: 2500 Rivermont Ave., Lynchburg, Virginia
- Coordinates: 37°26′14″N 79°10′19″W
- Area: 6 acres (2.4 ha)
- Built: 1891-1911, 1936
- Architect: Poindexter, William F.
- Architectural style: Queen Anne
- NRHP reference No.: 79003285
- VLR No.: 118-0149

Significant dates
- Added to NRHP: June 19, 1979
- Designated VLR: February 26, 1979

The Main Hall is a historic building located on the campus of Randolph College in Lynchburg, Virginia. It was built between 1891 and 1911, and is a large Queen Anne style brick building complex. The central entrance tower and eastern wings were constructed between 1891 and 1893. Two additional wings were added to the west in 1896. With the erection of a wing to the west in 1899, the building was completed according to the original plan. In 1911 an annex was added to the rear of the entrance pavilion. Further additions and renovations were made to the north elevation in 1936. Its most distinctive features is the central entrance tower with a front portico and topped by a parapet wall and capped by a classically inspired wooden cupola, crowned by a finial.

It was listed on the National Register of Historic Places in 1979.
