= Francis Haskell =

English art historian

Francis Haskell FBA
- Born: Francis James Herbert Haskell; 7 April 1928
- Died: 18 January 2000 (aged 71)
- Citizenship: United Kingdom
- Relatives: Arnold Haskell (father)
- Awards: Serena Medal, British Academy (1985)

Academic background
- Education: Lycée Français Charles de Gaulle; Eton College
- Alma mater: King's College, Cambridge

Academic work
- Discipline: Art history
- Institutions: King's College, Cambridge; Trinity College, Oxford

Francis James Herbert Haskell, FBA (7 April 1928 – 18 January 2000) was an English art historian, whose writings placed emphasis on the social history of art. He wrote one of the first and most influential patronage studies, Patrons and Painters.

== Early life and education ==
Haskell was born on 7 April 1928. He was the son of Arnold Haskell, an influential ballet critic and writer and Vera Saitzoff, daughter of a Russian industrialist and sister of writer Boris Zaytsev. His first language was French, the language shared by his parents, and he was fluent in English, French and Italian. From ages 5 to 8, Francis attended the Lycée Français Charles de Gaulle in London, and then at Eton College.

In 1948, after serving in the Royal Army Educational Corps, Haskell matriculated into King's College, Cambridge. He read history before switching to English, and among his tutors were Eric Hobsbawm and Dadie Rylands. At Cambridge, he was a member of the semi-secretive Cambridge Apostles society, a debating club largely reserved for the brightest students.

== Academic career ==
Haskell began his career not in academia but as a junior library clerk in the House of Commons from 1953 to 1954. In 1954, however, he was elected a fellow of King's. He was additionally librarian of the Faculty of Fine Arts, University of Cambridge, from 1962 to 1967. In 1967, he was elected Professor of Art History at the University of Oxford, where he remained until his retirement in 1995; the position made him, ex officio a visitor—that is, a trustee—of the Ashmolean Museum. He was additionally a fellow of Trinity College, Oxford, from 1967 to 1995. In November 1971, he was made a member of the British School at Rome for the next three years. He retired from Oxford in 1995, and was made an honorary fellow of his college.

He was a trustee of the Wallace Collection from 1976 to 1997. In 1976 Haskell, who often served on advisory committees for museum loan exhibitions, joined the National Art Collections Fund committee and became one of its most vocal members, defending the purchase of Poussin's Rebecca and Eliezar for the Fitzwilliam Museum in Cambridge (the government refused to accept the painting because it had been in the collection of the disgraced Anthony Blunt).

Haskell's research focused beyond artworks to people that surrounded them, including their patrons and history of the academic study of art. His interest in the circumstances in which paintings were displayed, which reflected the esteem in which they were held and influenced the way they were perceived runs as a leitmotiv through his published work, beginning with an article jointly written with Michael Levey in Arte Veneta, 1958, that was devoted to art exhibitions in eighteenth-century Venice.

== Personal life ==
His wife, Larissa, née Salmina (1931–2024), had been a curator at the Hermitage Museum in St. Petersburg, Russia. They met in Venice in 1962, married in 1965, and lived in Walton Street, Oxford. They did not have any children.

Haskell died of liver cancer on 18 January 2000, aged 71.

== Honours ==
In 1971, he was elected a Fellow of the British Academy (FBA), the United Kingdom's national academy for the humanities and the social sciences. In 1979, he was elected to the American Academy of Arts and Sciences. He was awarded the Serena medal for Italian studies by the British Academy in 1985. He was elected to the American Philosophical Society in 1994. His book Rediscoveries in Art won the first Jan Mitchell Prize in 1977.

Haskell had been made a chevalier of the Légion d'honneur by the President of France in recognition of his work.

== Selected bibliography ==
- The Age of the Grand Tour. Crown Publishers, 1967, with Anthony Burgess.
- Patrons and Painters: Art and Society in Baroque Italy. Chatto & Windus, 1962. 2nd edition, 1980. Haskell was working on a further revised edition when he died.
- Rediscoveries in Art: Some Aspects of Taste, Fashion, and Collecting in England and France. Cornell University Press, 1976.
- Taste and the Antique: The Lure of Antique Sculpture 1500–1900. Yale University Press, 1981, with Nicholas Penny.
- Past and Present in Art and Taste: Selected Essays. Yale University Press, 1987.
- The Painful Birth of the Art Book. (Walther Neurath Memorial Lecture 19). Thames & Hudson, 1987.
- History and its Images: Art and the Interpretation of the Past. Yale University Press, 1993.
- The Ephemeral Museum: Old Master Paintings and the Rise of the Art Exhibition. Yale University Press, 2000.
- The King's Pictures: The Formation and Dispersal of the Collections of Charles I and His Courtiers. Yale University Press, 2013.

== Sources ==
- Гравюрный кабинет Фрэнсиса Хаскелла. Каталог выставки. Москва, Фонд In Artibus, 2023. ISBN 978-5-91668-021-8
