= Centerview (Lynchburg, Virginia) =

Historic house in Virginia, United States

- U.S. National Register of Historic Places
- Virginia Landmarks Register
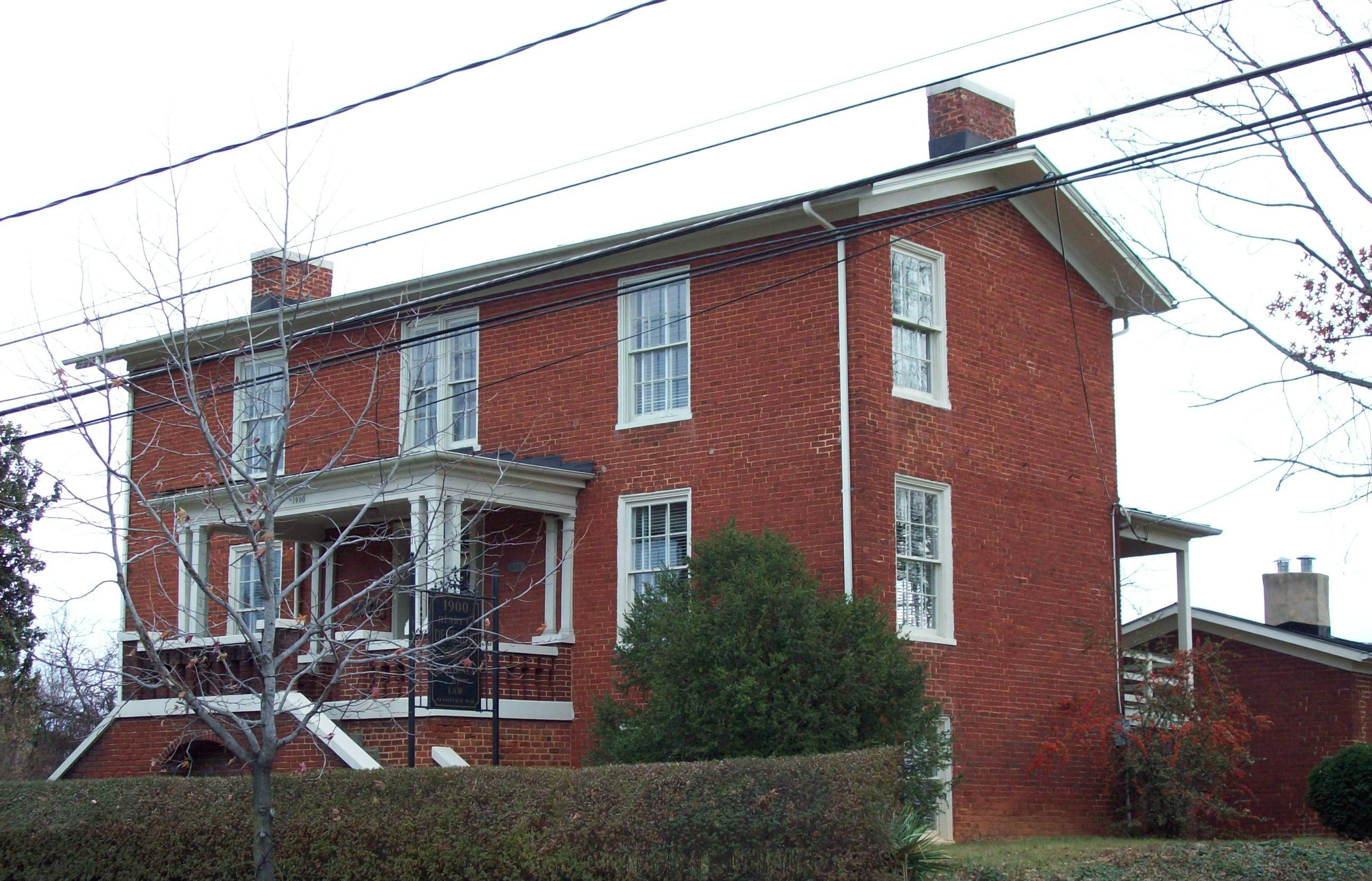
- Centerview, Lynchburg VA, November 2008

- Location within Virginia Location within the United States
- Location: 1900 Memorial Ave., Lynchburg, Virginia
- Coordinates: 37°24′30″N 79°9′43″W
- Area: 0.7 acres (0.28 ha)
- Built: 1871; 155 years ago
- Architectural style: Greek Revival
- NRHP reference No.: 00001435
- VLR No.: 118-5062

Significant dates
- Added to NRHP: December 1, 2000
- Designated VLR: September 13, 2000

Centerview is a historic home located at Lynchburg, Virginia. It is a two-story brick house completed in 1871 in the Greek Revival style. The dependency, which is similar in construction and detail to the main house but which may date to 1861, is a one-stay gabled brick building and originally served as a summer kitchen and cook's dwelling among other functions. The house and dependency were rehabilitated in 1999–2000 as law offices. Robert Withers Morgan and his family were long resident in the house; one of his six children was the painter Georgia Weston Morgan, who resided there until 1923.

It was listed on the National Register of Historic Places in 2000.
