= Randolph College =

Private liberal arts college in Lynchburg, Virginia, US

- Former name: Randolph-Macon Woman's College (1891–2007)
- Motto: Vita Abundantior
- Motto in English: Life More Abundant
- Type: Private liberal arts college
- Established: 1891; 135 years ago
- Religious affiliation: United Methodist Church (1891-2019); unaffiliated (2019-present)
- Academic affiliations: IAMSCU; Annapolis Group; CIC
- Endowment: $197 million (2022)
- President: Sue Ott Rowlands
- Faculty: 61
- Undergraduates: 634
- Postgraduates: 93
- Location: Lynchburg, Virginia, U.S. 37.4368°N 79.1718°W
- Campus: Suburban, historic; 100 acres (40 ha)
- Colors: Black & yellow
- Nickname: WildCats
- Sporting affiliations: NCAA Division III – ODAC
- Mascot: Wanda WildCat
- Website: randolphcollege.edu

Randolph College is a private liberal arts and sciences college in Lynchburg, Virginia, United States. Founded in 1891 as Randolph-Macon Woman's College, it was renamed on July 1, 2007, when it became coeducational. The college's intercollegiate athletic teams compete in NCAA Division III as a member of the Old Dominion Athletic Conference (ODAC). The college fields varsity teams in six men's and eight women's sports.

== History ==
The college was founded by William Waugh Smith, then-president of Randolph-Macon College, under Randolph-Macon's charter after he failed to convince R-MC to become co-educational. Randolph-Macon Woman's College has historic ties to the United Methodist Church. After many attempts to find a location for Randolph-Macon Woman's College, the city of Lynchburg donated 50 acres for the purpose of establishing a women's college. In 1916, it became the first women's college in the South to earn a Phi Beta Kappa charter. Beginning in 1953, the two colleges were governed by separate boards of trustees.

Main Hall, built in 1891, was listed on the National Register of Historic Places in 1979.

In August 2006, only a few weeks into the academic year, Randolph-Macon Woman's College announced that it would adopt coeducation and change its name. Former interim president Ginger H. Worden argued in a September 17, 2006 editorial for The Washington Post that,

Today, the college is embarking on a new future, one that will include men. Yet that original mission, that dedication to women's values and education, remains. The fact of the marketplace is that only 3 percent of college-age women say they will consider a women's college. The majority of our own students say they weren't looking for a single-sex college specifically. Most come despite the fact that we are a single-sex college. Our enrollment problems are not going away, and we compete with both coed and single-sex schools. Of the top 10 colleges to which our applicants also apply, seven are coed. Virtually all who transfer from R-MWC do so to a coed school. These market factors affect our financial realities.

The decision to go co-ed was not welcomed by everyone. Alumnae and students organized protests which were covered by local and national media. Many students accused the school of having recruited them under false pretenses, as the administration did not warn new or current students that they were considering admitting men. Lawsuits were filed against the school by both students and alumnae.

It was renamed Randolph College on July 1, 2007, when it became coeducational. The ensuing period of integration was, perhaps unsurprisingly, difficult. The first full-time male students saw their mailboxes and doors vandalized, and were quickly polarized. The last class to have the option to receive diplomas from Randolph-Macon Woman's College graduated on May 16, 2010.

Randolph College is named after John Randolph of Roanoke Plantation. Randolph (1773-1833) was an eccentric planter and politician who, in his will, released hundreds of slaves after his death and once fought a duel with Henry Clay.

=== Presidents ===
- Sue Ott Rowlands, 2022–present
- Bradley Bateman, 2013–2022
- John E. Klein, 2007–2013
- Ginger H. Worden '69 (Interim President), 2006–2007
- Kathleen Gill Bowman, 1994–2006
- Lambuth M. Clarke, 1993–1994
- Linda Koch Lorimer, 1987–1993
- Robert A. Spivey, 1978–1987
- William F. Quillian, Jr., 1952–1978
- Theodore Henley Jack, 1933–1952
- N. A. Pattillo, 1931–1933
- Dice Robins Anderson, 1920–1931
- William A. Webb, 1913–1919
- William Waugh Smith, 1891–1912

== Academics ==
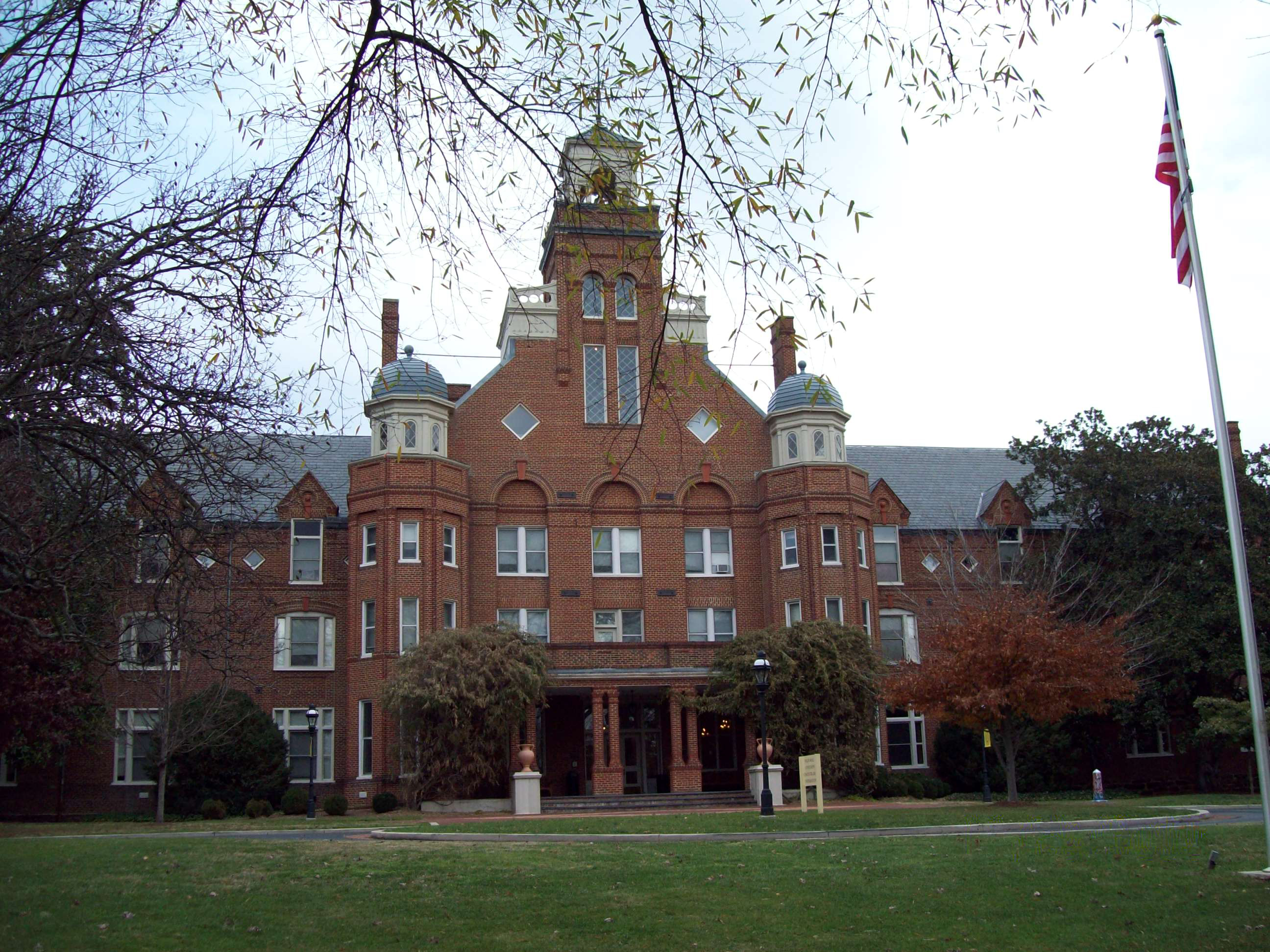
Main Hall of Randolph College

Randolph College is primarily an undergraduate institution, offering a Bachelor of Arts, Bachelor of Science, and a Bachelor of Fine Arts across the humanities, social sciences, and natural sciences. The College also offers several Master's programs: a Master of Arts in Teaching, a Master of Fine Arts in Creative Writing, a Master of Fine Arts in Theatre, and a Master of Coaching and Sport Leadership.

In the fall of 2021, Randolph launched a new curriculum model called TAKE2. This model breaks each semester up into seven-week "sessions," during which students take two courses at a time. This is a break from the traditional curricular model where students take four or five courses through an entire semester.

== Maier Museum of Art ==
Randolph College's Maier Museum of Art features works by American artists of the 19th and 20th centuries. The college has been collecting American art since 1907 and the Maier now houses a collection of several thousand paintings, prints, drawings, and photographs in the college's permanent collection.

The Maier hosts a schedule of special exhibitions and education programs throughout the year.

In 2007, there was some controversy when Randolph College announced that it would sell four paintings from its collection.

== Traditions ==
The rivalry between 'odd' and 'even' graduating classes is the lynchpin of many traditions at Randolph College. The groups are distinguished based on whether their graduation year is an odd or even number, hence the names. As students spend four years earning their undergraduate degrees at Randolph, there are always two odd 'sister-classes' and two even 'sister-classes'. These groups participate in certain celebratory events together depending on the year.

== Special programs ==
=== Randolph College Abroad: The World in Britain ===
Since 1968, the college has hosted a study abroad program at the University of Reading, England. Each year as many as 35 students are selected for the program. Commonly taken during the junior year, students may choose to enroll for the full academic year or for the fall or spring semester only. Students live in one of three Randolph-owned houses across the street from the University of Reading campus, and travel as a class to various cities and destinations in England. In 2018, the Randolph College Board of Trustees made the decision to end The World in Britain program after the ensuing academic year.

=== The American Culture program ===
A minor in American Culture offers Randolph College students the opportunity to study American society and culture by drawing upon resources, techniques, and approaches from a variety of disciplines. The American Culture program also accepts visiting students from other American colleges and universities for a one-semester intensive study of a particular theme or region, including literature, art, history, and travel components.

== Athletics ==
Randolph athletics wordmark

Randolph College is affiliated to NCAA Division III, participating in the Old Dominion Athletic Conference (ODAC). The college athletics program offers a total of twenty two intercollegiate sports.

Men's sports	Women's sports
Basketball	Basketball
Cross-country	Cross-country
Lacrosse	Lacrosse
Soccer	Soccer
Swimming	Softball
Tennis	Stunt
Track & field (indoor & outdoor)	Swimming
Volleyball	Tennis
Wrestling	Track & field (indoor & outdoor)
	Volleyball
	Wrestling

=== ODAC championships ===
Sport	Titles	Winning years
Equestrian	4	2002, 2003, 2005, 2018
Fencing	1	1983
Men's soccer	1	2011
Women's tennis	1	1983

=== NCAA tournament appeaarances ===
Men's basketball

2013

Division	Round	Opponent	Result
Division III	First round	Emory	L 56-77

Men's soccer

2011

Division	Round	Opponent	Result
Division III	First round	Christopher Newport	W 2-1
Division III	Second round	DeSales	W 3-2
Division III	Third round	UT Tyler	L 1-2

== Notable people ==
=== Faculty ===
- Laura-Gray Street, poet
- Gary Dop, poet
- Elsie W. Helmrich (1886–1979), head of German department
- Celestia Susannah Parrish (1853–1918), psychologist and educator
- Louise Jordan Smith (1869–1928), painter
- Rudy Rucker (1980–1982), mathematician, computer scientist, science fiction author and one of the founders of the cyberpunk literary movement
- Susan Kellermann, actress
- Audrey Shuey (1910–1977), Psychology Department chair and exponent of scientific racism

=== Alumnae ===
Name	Known for	Relationship to college
Pearl S. Buck	First woman from the United States to win the Nobel Prize in Literature in 1938 for "the body of her work". Her most famous work, The Good Earth won the 1932 Pulitzer Prize.	class of 1914
Helen Claire	Actress on Broadway and in old-time radio	
Dorothy (Park) Clark	Author of historical novels, mainly under the pen name Clark McMeekin	ca. 1917
Candy Crowley	CNN senior political correspondent whose career includes two awards for outstanding journalism, from the National Press Foundation and the Associated Press.	class of 1970
Odilia Dank	Republican member of the Oklahoma House of Representatives from 1994 to 2006; first woman to chair the House Education Committee; school counselor by occupation; native of Cleveland, Ohio	class of 1960
Sara Driver	Independent filmmaker, director of You Are Not I (1981), Sleepwalk (1986), and When Pigs Fly (1993); producer of two early Jim Jarmusch films, Permanent Vacation and Stranger Than Paradise.	class of 1977
Daisy Hurst Floyd	Dean of the Walter F. George School of Law of Mercer University, 2004 until 2010	attended 1973 until 1975
E. Lee Hennessee	Hedge fund pioneer and philanthropist. Campaign Finance chair for Elizabeth Dole.	
Lucy Somerville Howorth	American lawyer, feminist and politician.	class of 1916
Frank M. Hull	Current judge on the United States Court of Appeals for the Eleventh Circuit.	class of 1970
Missy Irvin	Republican member of the Arkansas State Senate from Mountain View since 2011	class of 1993
Iris Kelso	Influential newspaper journalist and television commentator in New Orleans, Louisiana; won a Peabody Award for her television reports	class of 1948
Blanche Lincoln	Democratic U.S. Senator from Arkansas from 1999 to 2011. She has previously served in the U.S. House of Representatives from Arkansas's 1st congressional district. At the age of 38, Lincoln was the youngest woman to be elected to the Senate, in 1998.	class of 1982
Kakenya Ntaiya	Founder of Kakenya Center for Excellence, a school for girls in Kenya, and women's education and health activist.	class of 2004
Suzanne Patrick	US Deputy Undersecretary of Defense for Industrial Policy	class of 1977
Anne McCarty Braden	Social-justice activist, civil rights leader.	class of 1946
Emily Squires	One of the twelve directors of Sesame Street. She won 6 Daytime Emmys.	class of 1961
Anne Wilkes Tucker	Museum of Fine Arts, Houston; photography curator; (named "America's Best Curator" by Time, in 2001)	class of 1967
Susan Webber Wright	US district court judge in Little Rock, Arkansas. She presided over Paula Jones's sexual harassment lawsuit against former President Bill Clinton. She was also involved with the investigation of the Whitewater Scandal with Kenneth Starr.	class of 1970
