= National Register of Historic Places listings in Amherst County, Virginia =

Location of Amherst County in Virginia

This is a list of the National Register of Historic Places listings in Amherst County, Virginia.

This is intended to be a complete list of the properties and districts on the National Register of Historic Places in Amherst County, Virginia, United States. The locations of National Register properties and districts for which the latitude and longitude coordinates are included below, may be seen in an online map.

There are 38 properties and districts listed on the National Register in the county, including one National Historic Landmark. Another property was once listed but has been removed.

This National Park Service list is complete through NPS recent listings posted March 6, 2026.

== Current listings ==
	Name on the Register	Image	Date listed	Location	City or town	Description
1	Amherst Baptist Church	Amherst Baptist Church	May 27, 2021 (#100006575)	190-194 2nd St. 37°34′59″N 79°02′54″W	Amherst	
2	Bear Mountain Indian Mission School	Bear Mountain Indian Mission School	February 21, 1997 (#97000152)	Southwestern corner of the junction of Kenmore and Indian Mission Rds. 37°34′22″N 79°07′37″W	Amherst	
3	Blue Ridge Parkway	Blue Ridge Parkway	December 13, 2024 (#100011353)	Blue Ridge Parkway through Virginia and North Carolina; 37°38′39″N 79°19′48″W	Buena Vista vicinity	
4	Brick House	Brick House	February 1, 2006 (#05001620)	854 Fletcher's Level Rd. 37°38′38″N 79°01′17″W	Clifford	
5	Brightwells Mill Complex	Brightwells Mill Complex	August 15, 2016 (#16000527)	586 Brightwells Mill Rd. 37°27′31″N 79°02′51″W	Madison Heights	
6	Clifford-New Glasgow Historic District	Clifford-New Glasgow Historic District	March 12, 2012 (#12000122)	State Route 151 and Fletchers Level Rd. 37°38′25″N 79°01′20″W	Clifford	
7	Dameron Cottage		February 5, 2024 (#100009241)	462 South Main St. 37°34′41″N 79°03′27″W	Amherst	
8	Dulwich Manor	Dulwich Manor	May 28, 2013 (#13000335)	550 U.S. Route 60; 37°34′27″N 79°02′30″W	Amherst	
9	Edge Hill	Edge Hill	May 15, 2008 (#08000418)	1380 Edgehill Plantation Rd. 37°30′11″N 78°55′33″W	Gladstone	
10	Edgewood	Edgewood	March 14, 2008 (#08000200)	591 Puppy Creek Rd. 37°38′38″N 79°09′34″W	Amherst	
11	Edgewood	Edgewood	August 16, 2006 (#06000706)	138 Garland Ave. 37°34′55″N 79°03′20″W	Amherst	
12	El Bethel Methodist Church	El Bethel Methodist Church	April 20, 2018 (#100002354)	925 Buffalo Springs Turnpike; 37°38′43″N 79°13′15″W	Amherst	
13	Elon Village Library	Elon Village Library	November 22, 2016 (#16000793)	Corner of Camden and Younger Drs. 37°30′50″N 79°11′40″W	Amherst	
14	Emmanuel Baptist Church	Emmanuel Baptist Church	April 27, 2018 (#100002391)	205 Sandidges Rd. 37°39′44″N 79°08′45″W	Amherst	
15	Fairview	Fairview	June 3, 2009 (#09000391)	2416 Lowesville Rd. 37°41′58″N 79°03′56″W	Amherst	
16	Forest Hill	Forest Hill	March 22, 2007 (#07000218)	713 Indian Creek Rd. 37°42′26″N 79°05′04″W	Amherst	
17	Fort Riverview (44AH91 and 44AH195)	Fort Riverview (44AH91 and 44AH195)	November 16, 1989 (#89001921)	Hilltop above the James River; 37°23′45″N 79°03′55″W	Madison Heights	
18	Galt's Mill Complex	Galt's Mill Complex	September 30, 2009 (#09000791)	1133 Galt's Mill Rd. 37°26′49″N 79°00′39″W	Madison Heights	
19	Geddes	Geddes	February 24, 1983 (#83003257)	Jefferson Trace; 37°40′01″N 78°59′14″W	Clifford	
20	The Glebe	The Glebe	May 15, 2008 (#08000419)	156 State Route 151; 37°37′23″N 79°00′50″W	Amherst	
21	Hanshill	Hanshill	September 29, 2011 (#11000715)	142 Leftwich Rd. 37°28′18″N 79°09′15″W	Madison Heights	
22	Hite Store	Hite Store	June 6, 1997 (#97000487)	0.25 miles (0.40 km) south of the junction of Woodson and Lowesville Rds. 37°43′06″N 79°04′01″W	Lowesville	
23	Kenmore Farm	Kenmore Farm	February 17, 2015 (#15000012)	369 Kenmore Rd. 37°35′08″N 79°04′12″W	Amherst	
24	Macedonia Methodist Church	Macedonia Methodist Church	February 8, 2012 (#12000017)	1408 Coffeytown Rd. 37°46′20″N 79°13′39″W	Vesuvius	
25	Madison Heights Elementary School	Madison Heights Elementary School	April 2, 2019 (#100003601)	123 Phelps Rd. 37°25′52″N 79°07′21″W	Madison Heights	
26	Mountain View Farm	Mountain View Farm	September 3, 1997 (#96001453)	2229 N. U.S. Route 29; 37°38′29″N 78°59′08″W	Clifford	
27	Norfolk Southern Six Mile Bridge No. 58	Norfolk Southern Six Mile Bridge No. 58	October 12, 1995 (#95001175)	Over the James River west of the junction of Mt. Athos Rd. and the Norfolk Southern Railroad tracks 37°23′35″N 79°03′46″W	Lynchburg	
28	Oak Lawn	Oak Lawn	September 6, 2006 (#06000802)	155 Winridge Dr. 37°29′03″N 79°08′59″W	Madison Heights	
29	Royster C. Parr House		November 16, 2021 (#100007185)	156 Parrtown Rd. 37°40′47″N 79°04′34″W	Amherst vicinity	
30	Red Hill Farm	Red Hill Farm	June 9, 1980 (#80004168)	West of Pedlar Mills on Minors Branch Rd. 37°33′28″N 79°15′53″W	Pedlar Mills	
31	St. Luke's Episcopal Church	St. Luke's Episcopal Church	November 24, 2017 (#100001849)	3788 Buffalo Springs Turnpike; 37°33′32″N 79°15′17″W	Pedlar Mills	
32	Scott Zion Baptist Church	Scott Zion Baptist Church	March 23, 2022 (#100007568)	2602 Galts Mill Rd. 37°26′43″N 79°04′04″W	Madison Heights	
33	Speed the Plough	Speed the Plough	April 30, 2007 (#07000391)	389 Fair Lea Ln. 37°32′00″N 79°11′28″W	Monroe	
34	Sweet Briar College Historic District	Sweet Briar College Historic District	March 30, 1995 (#95000240)	Sweet Briar Dr., 0.5 miles west of U.S. Route 29; 37°33′14″N 79°04′48″W	Sweet Briar	
35	Sweet Briar House	Sweet Briar House	September 15, 1970 (#70000783)	Southwest of the junction of U.S. Route 29 and Sweet Briar Rd. 37°33′27″N 79°04′58″W	Sweet Briar	
36	Thompson's Mill-Amherst Mill Complex	Thompson's Mill-Amherst Mill Complex	March 5, 2019 (#100003484)	138-140 Union Hill Rd. 37°34′36″N 79°02′55″W	Amherst	
37	Tusculum	Tusculum	November 19, 2004 (#04001244)	2077 N. U.S. Route 29; 37°38′10″N 78°59′51″W	Amherst	
38	Winton	Winton	May 2, 1974 (#74002104)	West of State Route 151; 37°38′17″N 79°01′27″W	Clifford	

== Former listing ==
	Name on the Register	Image	Date listed	Date removed	Location	City or town	Description
1	Athlone		September 24, 1992 (#92001029)	March 19, 2001	Junction of VA 151 and VA 674	Amherst	Destroyed by fire

== See also ==
- List of National Historic Landmarks in Virginia
- National Register of Historic Places listings in Virginia
