= Brightwells Mill Complex =

- U.S. National Register of Historic Places
- U.S. Historic district
- Virginia Landmarks Register
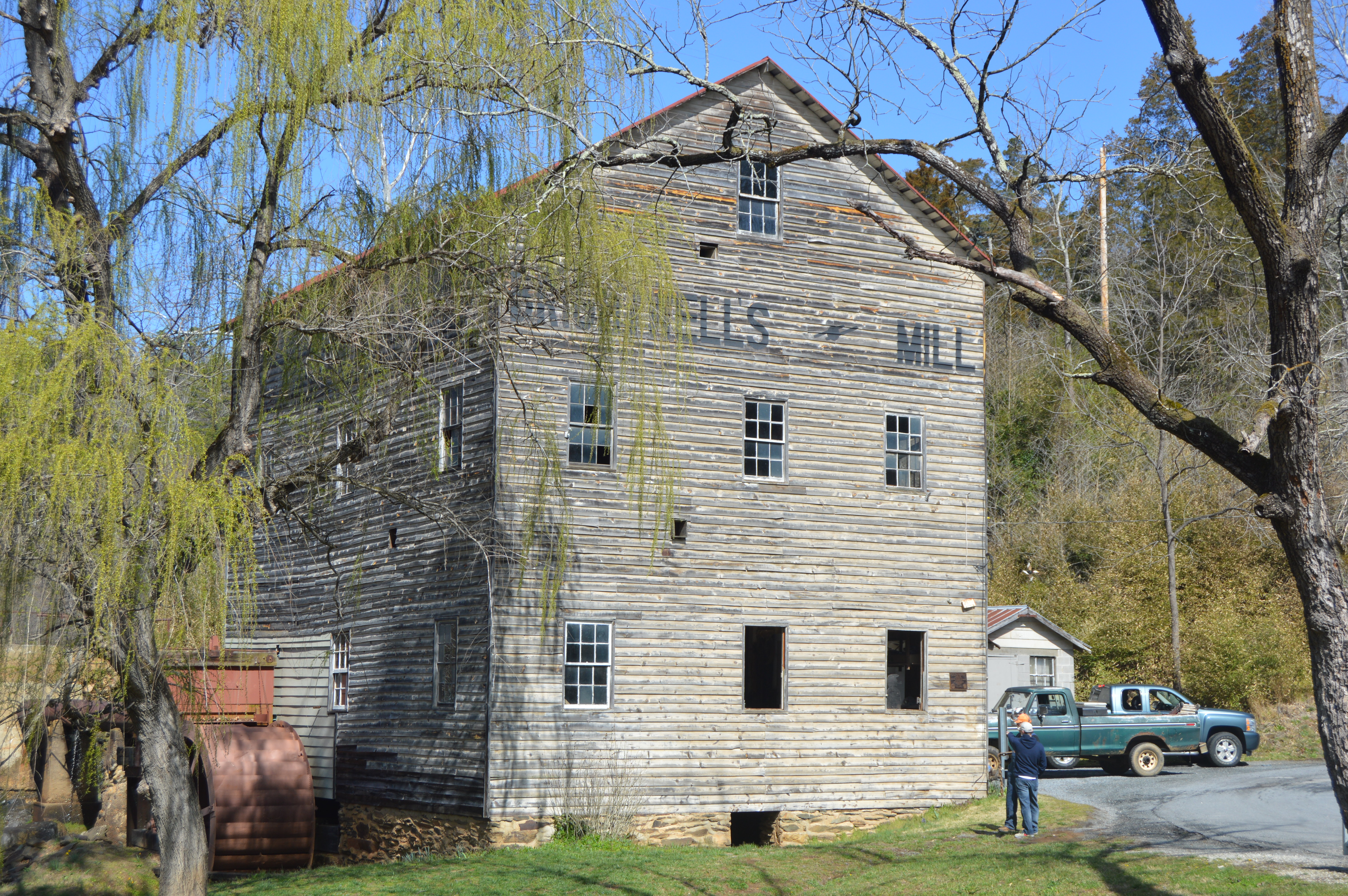

- Location within Virginia Location within the United States
- Location: 684 Brightwells Mill Rd., Madison Heights, Virginia
- Coordinates: 37°27′31″N 79°02′51″W
- Area: 110 acres (45 ha)
- Built: 1826
- NRHP reference No.: 16000527
- VLR No.: 005-0035

Significant dates
- Added to NRHP: August 15, 2016
- Designated VLR: June 16, 2016

The Brightwells Mill Complex historic 19th-century mill complex at 684 Brightwells Mill Road in Madison Heights, Amherst County, Virginia. It includes a reconstructed 1826 wood-frame mill, dam, miller's house, a number of outbuildings, and a small cemetery. The dam and mill both date to 1942, when a flash flood destroyed 19th-century structures. The mill was rebuilt using materials salvaged from the 1826 mill, while the dam was rebuilt in concrete. The mill was used to process the grain of local farmers until 1965.

The complex was added to the National Register of Historic Places in 2016.

== See also ==
- National Register of Historic Places listings in Amherst County, Virginia
