= Kenmore Farm =

US historic farm and educational property in Virginia

- U.S. National Register of Historic Places
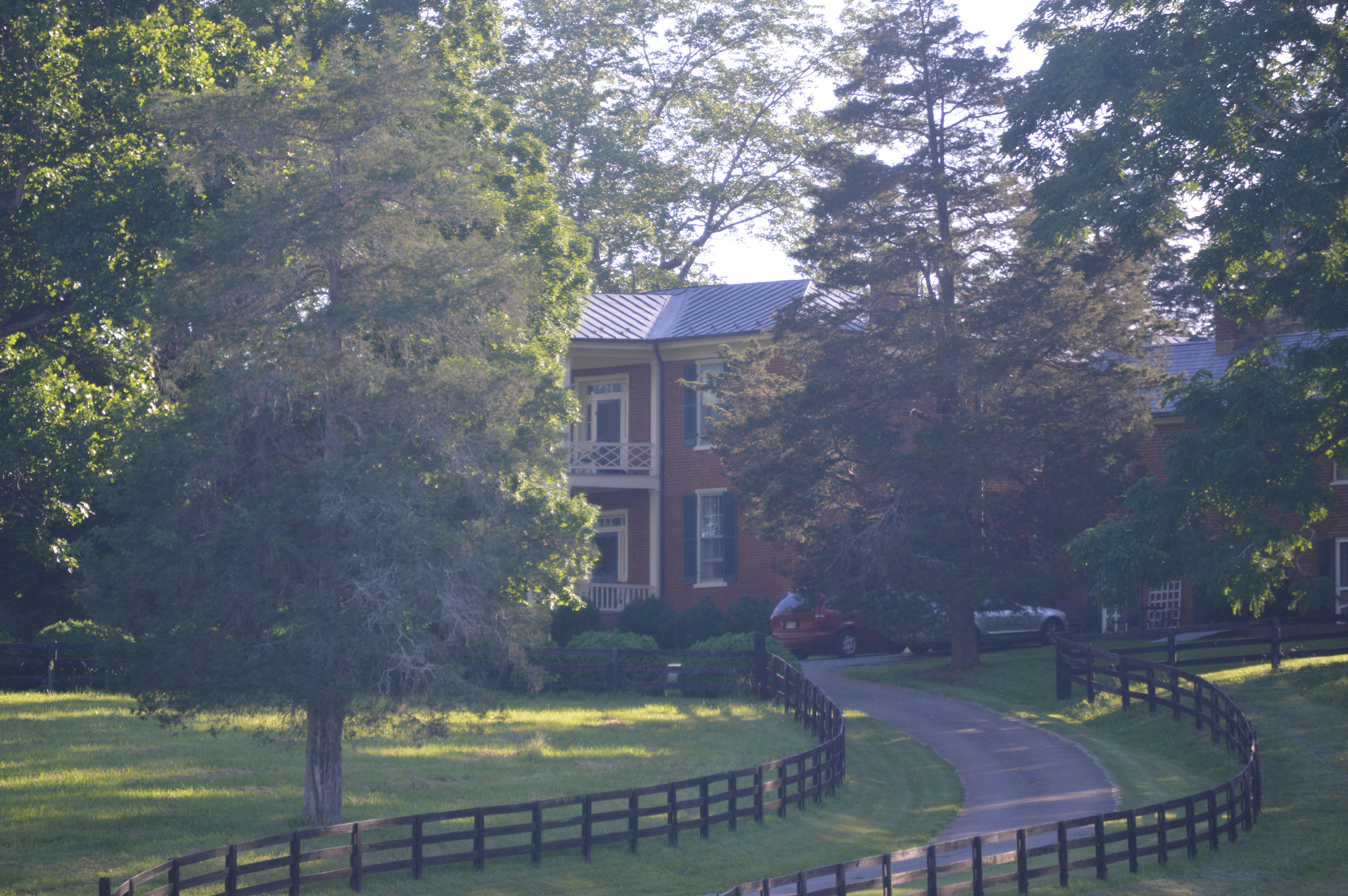
- Farmhouse seen from Kenmore Road

- Location within Virginia Location within the United States
- Location: 369 Kenmore Rd., Amherst, Virginia
- Coordinates: 37°35′35″N 79°5′26″W
- Area: 131.6 acres (53.3 ha)
- Built: c. 1856
- Architectural style: Greek Revival
- NRHP reference No.: 15000012
- Added to NRHP: February 17, 2015

Kenmore Farm is a historic farm and educational property at 369 Kenmore Road, just outside Amherst, Virginia. The centerpiece of the more than 130-acre (53 ha) property is a c. 1856 brick Greek Revival farmhouse, built by Samuel Garland, Sr., a prominent local lawyer and politician. The property was used intermittently between 1872 and 1899 as a preparatory high school, operated by Henry Aubrey Strode, who later became the first president of Clemson University. As such, its building complex includes a dormitory and apartment building in addition to various mainly agricultural outbuildings, including a corn crib and barn, and the remnants of an outdoor summer kitchen. The property has seen predominantly agrarian use in the 20th century.

The property was added to the National Register of Historic Places in 2015.

== See also ==
- National Register of Historic Places listings in Amherst County, Virginia
