= Elon Village Library =

- U.S. National Register of Historic Places
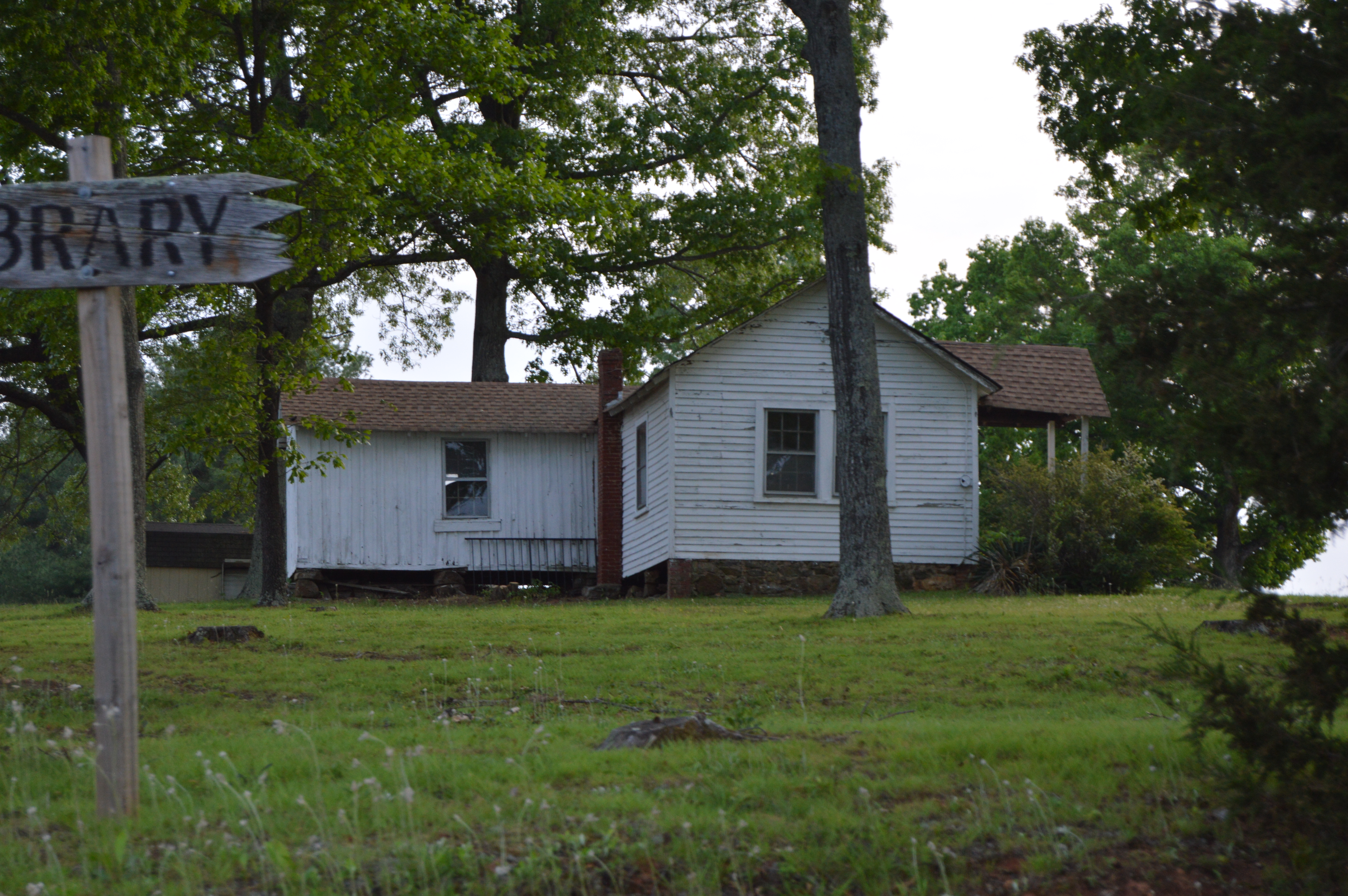

- Location within Virginia Location within the United States
- Location: Corner of Camden and Younger Drs., Amherst, Virginia
- Coordinates: 37°30′50″N 79°11′40″W
- Built: 1918
- NRHP reference No.: 16000793
- Added to NRHP: November 22, 2016

The Elon Public Library is a historic public library building at Camden and Younger Drives in Amherst, Virginia. It is a modest vernacular single story wood-frame structure with a gabled roof. It was built in 1918, and was the Amherst County's first rural free library. It served as a lending library for the surrounding area until 1965, as well as a community meeting space and polling place. It was closed when the county dedicated a portion of the nearby school for use as a public library.

The building was added to the National Register of Historic Places in 2016.

== See also ==
- National Register of Historic Places listings in Amherst County, Virginia
