= YWCA Camp Davern =

Summer camp in Ontario

Coordinates: 44.772014°N 76.506780°W

Camp Davern is a traditional summer camp located near Maberly, Ontario, Canada, 100 kilometers west of Ottawa.

The camp was established in 1946, and was operated by the YWCA until 2015. In 2018, it reopened as an independently owned and operated coeducational camp for children aged 6–16 years old. It functions as an overnight summer camp and centre for outdoor education in the spring and fall. Davern is one of Ontario's oldest summer camps and has hosted third-generation campers. Originally, a Canadian Pacific Railway train brought campers from Ottawa, stopping on the rail line just north of the camp to drop them off. Today, campers travel from Ottawa on chartered buses.

== See also ==
- Camp Mar-Y-Mac
- Hanshill
- List of summer camps
