= Forest Hill (Amherst, Virginia) =

Historic house in Virginia, United States

- U.S. National Register of Historic Places
- Virginia Landmarks Register
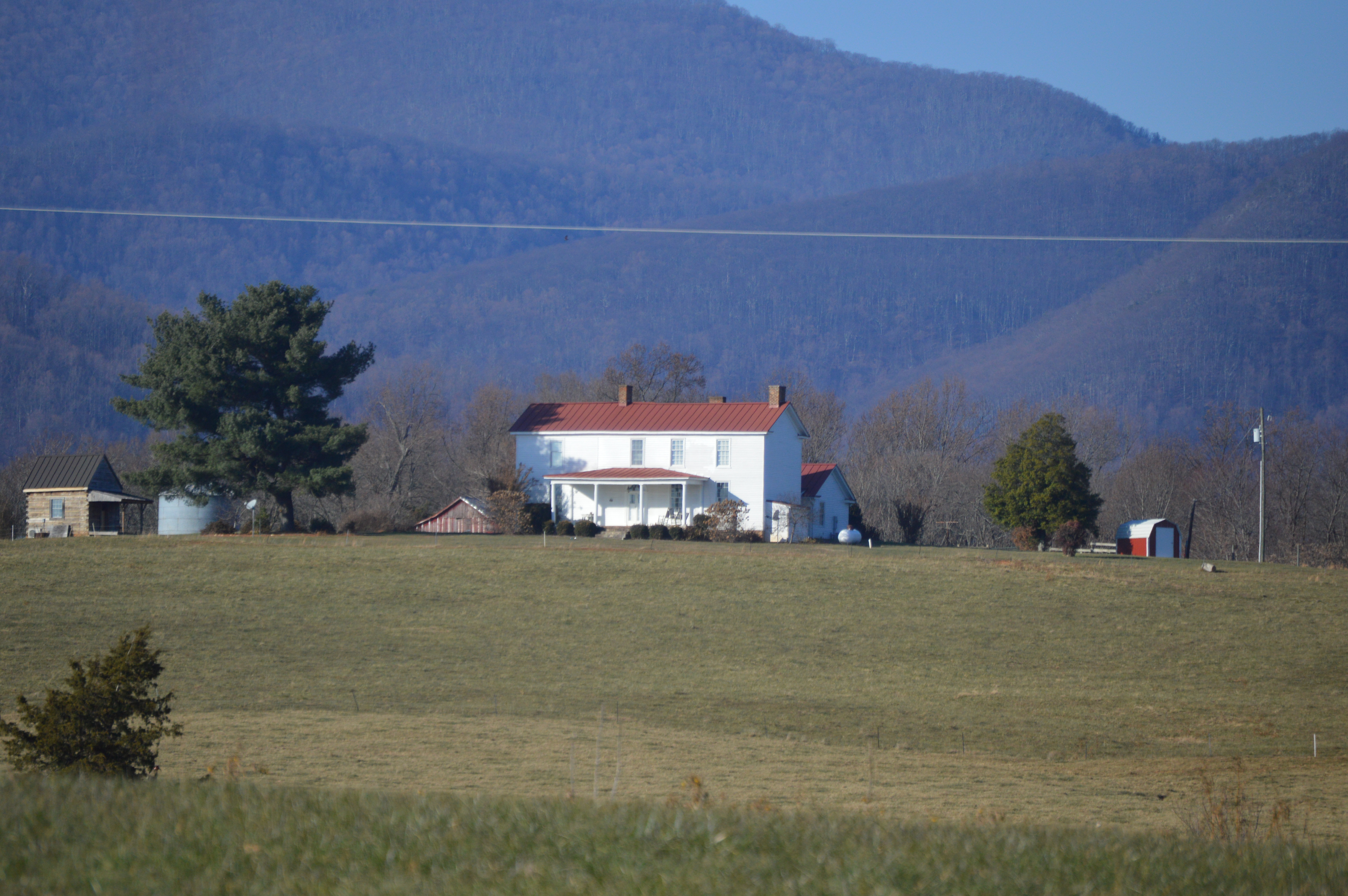
- Distant view from the southwest, with the Blue Ridge in the background

- Location within Virginia Location within the United States
- Location: 713 Indian Creek Rd., near Lowesville, Virginia
- Coordinates: 37°42′26″N 79°5′4″W
- Area: 220 acres (89 ha)
- Built: 1803
- NRHP reference No.: 07000218
- VLR No.: 005-0108

Significant dates
- Added to NRHP: March 22, 2007
- Designated VLR: December 6, 2006

Forest Hill is a historic home located near Amherst, Amherst County, Virginia. The original section was built about 1803, with two-story wings added later in the 19th century. It is a two-story, frame I-house with interior Federal style detailing. Also on the property are the contributing tobacco barn (c. 1900), smokehouse (c. 1800), tenant house (c. 1900), corncrib (c. 1800), crib barn (c. 1800), and tool shed (c. 1900).

In 1847, owner William Waller, aged 58, walked from Forest Hill to Louisiana with about 20 slaves for sale. His letters home during the trip, held by the Virginia Historical Society, provide rare documentation of a slave coffle.

Forest Hill was added to the National Register of Historic Places in 2006.
