= Gloucester, North Carolina =

- Census-designated place
- Location within North Carolina
- Coordinates: 34°43′46″N 76°32′20″W
- Country: United States
- State: North Carolina
- County: Carteret

Area
  - Total: 1.45 sq mi (3.76 km^{2})
  - Land: 1.44 sq mi (3.72 km^{2})
  - Water: 0.015 sq mi (0.04 km^{2})
- Elevation: 7 ft (2.1 m)

Population (2020)
  - Total: 495
  - Density: 344.8/sq mi (133.11/km^{2})
- Time zone: UTC-5 (Eastern (EST))
  - Summer (DST): UTC-4 (EDT)
- ZIP code: 28528
- Area code: 252
- FIPS code: 37-26680
- GNIS feature ID: 2628629

Gloucester is an unincorporated area and census-designated place (CDP) in Carteret County, North Carolina, United States. As of the 2020 census, Gloucester had a population of 495.

== Geography ==
Gloucester is located just east of the center of Carteret County, on the northern side of The Straits, a tidal channel connecting Core Sound to the east with the North River to the west. The Gloucester CDP is bounded by Whitehurst Creek to the west and Sleepy Creek to the east, both tidal inlets from The Straits. The community is 6 miles (10 km) east of the town of Beaufort by water and 15 miles (24 km) by road.

The Gloucester CDP has a total area of 1.5 square miles (3.8 km^{2}), of which 0.02 square miles (0.04 km^{2}), or 0.98%, is water.

== Demographics ==
Historical population
Census	Pop.	Note	%±
2020	495		—
U.S. Decennial Census

== Notable people ==
- David B. Mintz, Methodist circuit rider minister for Gloucester in 1803
