= Hanshill =

Historic house in Virginia, United States

- U.S. National Register of Historic Places
- Virginia Landmarks Register
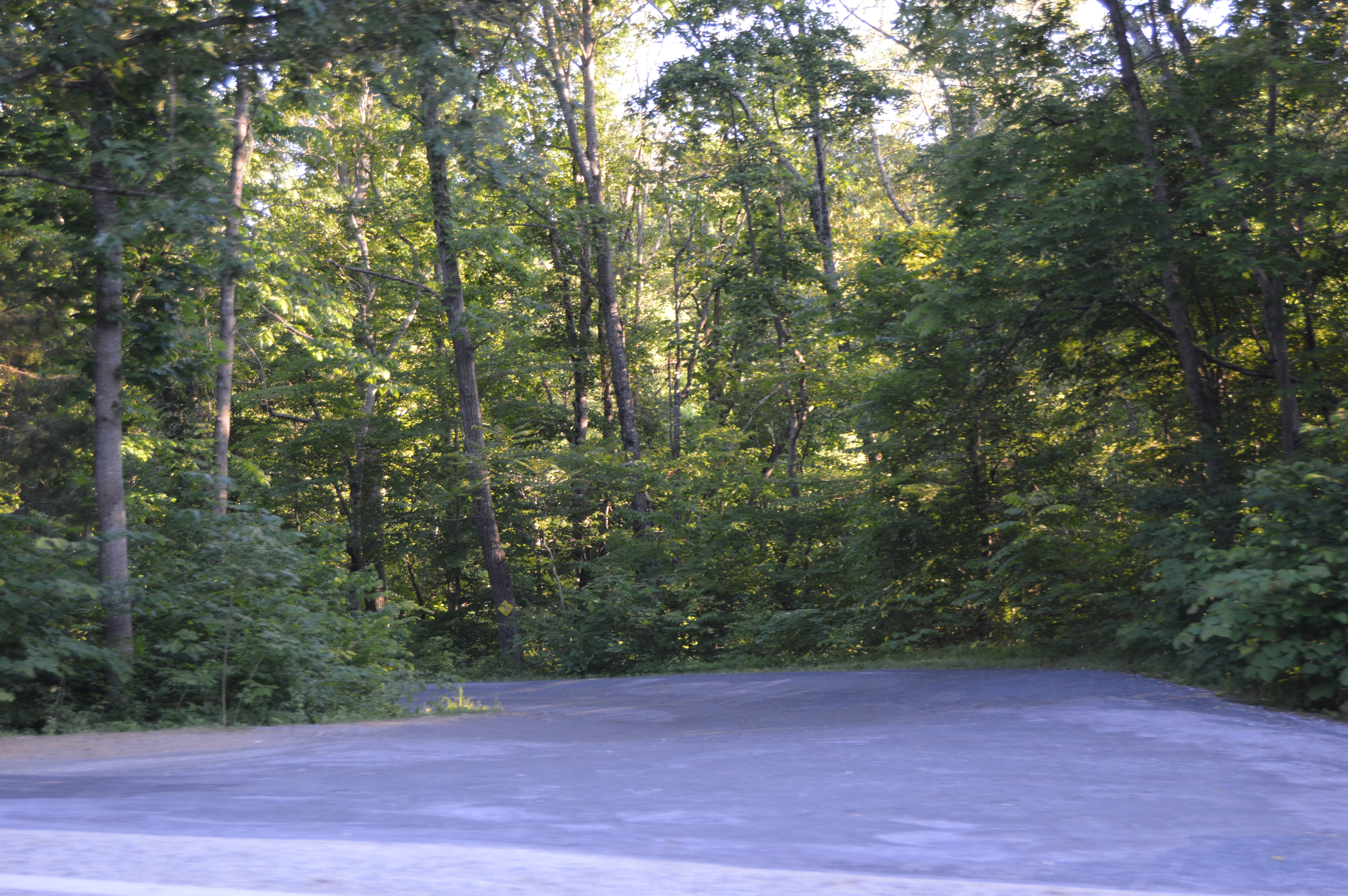
- Entrance to the property

- Location within Virginia Location within the United States
- Location: 142 Leftwich Rd., near Madison Heights, Virginia
- Coordinates: 37°28′26″N 79°09′06″W
- Area: 87.69 acres (35.49 ha)
- Built: c. 1910, 1925
- Architect: Clark, Pendleton S.; Crowe, Walter R.; Merkey, Clyde Adrian
- Architectural style: Rustic Revival
- NRHP reference No.: 11000715
- VLR No.: 005-5329

Significant dates
- Added to NRHP: September 6, 2006
- Designated VLR: June 16, 2011

Hanshill, also known as Rough House, Camp Suhling, and Camp Merry Minglers, is a historic summer home and camp located near Madison Heights, Amherst County, Virginia. The property was developed by the Suhling family. Rough House dates to about 1880 and is a log cabin with a gable roof. It was named Rough House as early as 1918, and a series of additions were added about 1935. Associated with Rough House are a contributing corn crib (c. 1940) and Y.W.C.A. Spring Box (c. 1918). Hanshill was built in 1925, and is a 1 1/2-story, frame dwelling on a concrete foundation in a Rustic Revival style. It features a full-length, one-story, four-bay porch. Associated with Hanshill are servant's quarters (c. 1927), a garage / bunkhouse (c. 1927), and an outdoor tennis court (c. 1915). From 1918 to 1922, the property hosted the first semi-permanent summer camp for white girls organized by the Young Women's Christian Association (Y.W.C.A.) of Lynchburg.

It was added to the National Register of Historic Places in 2011.

== See also ==
- Camp Mar-Y-Mac
- YWCA Camp Davern
- List of summer camps
- National Register of Historic Places listings in Amherst County, Virginia
