= David B. Mintz =

American Methodist minister (19th century)

David B. Mintz was an early-nineteenth-century minister of the Methodist Episcopal Church in North Carolina. He was a revivalist of the Second Great Awakening, and published two collections of camp meeting songs, despite the official stance of the Methodist Church which prohibited popular folk hymns.

== Life ==
Very little is known of Mintz' early life. His father may have been John Mintz, who owned land in Johnston County, North Carolina in 1761. He may also have had a brother, John Westley Martin Bryan Mintz, who bought land in New Bern in 1812.

At the 1802 Methodist Episcopal Church annual conference in Virginia, Mintz was made a travelling circuit rider minister on a standard one year probationary trial, and was stationed in the Amherst circuit. He was made a deacon in 1803, and was assigned the Gloucester, North Carolina circuit. In 1804, he was stationed in the Pamlico circuit, and in 1805 – only three years after becoming a minister – was made an elder, and took on the Tar River circuit with John French. That year he published the Spiritual Song Book, his first collection of camp meeting hymns, printed by Abraham Hodge in Halifax.

In 1806, he was assigned the New Bern circuit, where he published his second collection Hymns and Spiritual Songs, as well as books by Samuel Coate, and the famous preacher Lorenzo Dow. In 1807, he gave up his ministry, settled in New Bern, and married Susannah Armstrong née Bryan (born 1778) on January 28, 1807. Susannah was the daughter of Brigadier General William Bryan (c. 1730s – 1791) of the North Carolina militia, and had five children from her first marriage. Together they had a daughter, Hollon A. Mintz (c. 1810 – 1852), probably named after Susannah's sister. Mintz bought land in New Bern "on the east side of Front Street and upon the Neuse River" in 1811, and by 1812 had become a freemason of St John's Lodge, New Bern. He continued to receive money from the estate of Susannah's first husband for the upkeep of their children until January 1, 1816, after which mentions of him cease, and by the time of the 1820 United States census, Susannah was listed as head of the household.

== Hymns ==
Mintz became a Methodist minister during the Second Great Awakening, a Protestant religious revival. As part of this movement, camp meetings became very popular, with spontaneous improvised songs being a key element of their success. Despite the Methodists having a prohibition on these songs, George Pullen Jackson described them as an "adaptive denomination [who] had the practical sense ... while fighting off the religious folk songs officially and excluding them from their authorized collections, to allow their revivalists—from Mintz and Lorenzo Dow onward—to use them freely in swelling the ranks of Methodism."

Mintz' Spiritual Song Book (1805), which collected many of these camp meeting folk hymns, claimed to be "for the pious of all denominations", but many of the songs were strongly pro-Methodist, part of their counter-offensive against the Baptists.

== Books ==
As compiler

- Spiritual Song Book (1805)
- Hymns and Spiritual Songs (1806)

As publisher

- A Guide to True Happiness by Samuel Coate (1806)
- Lorenzo's Thoughts on Various Religious Opinions by Lorenzo Dow (1806)
