= Camp Mar-Y-Mac =

Summer camp in California, US

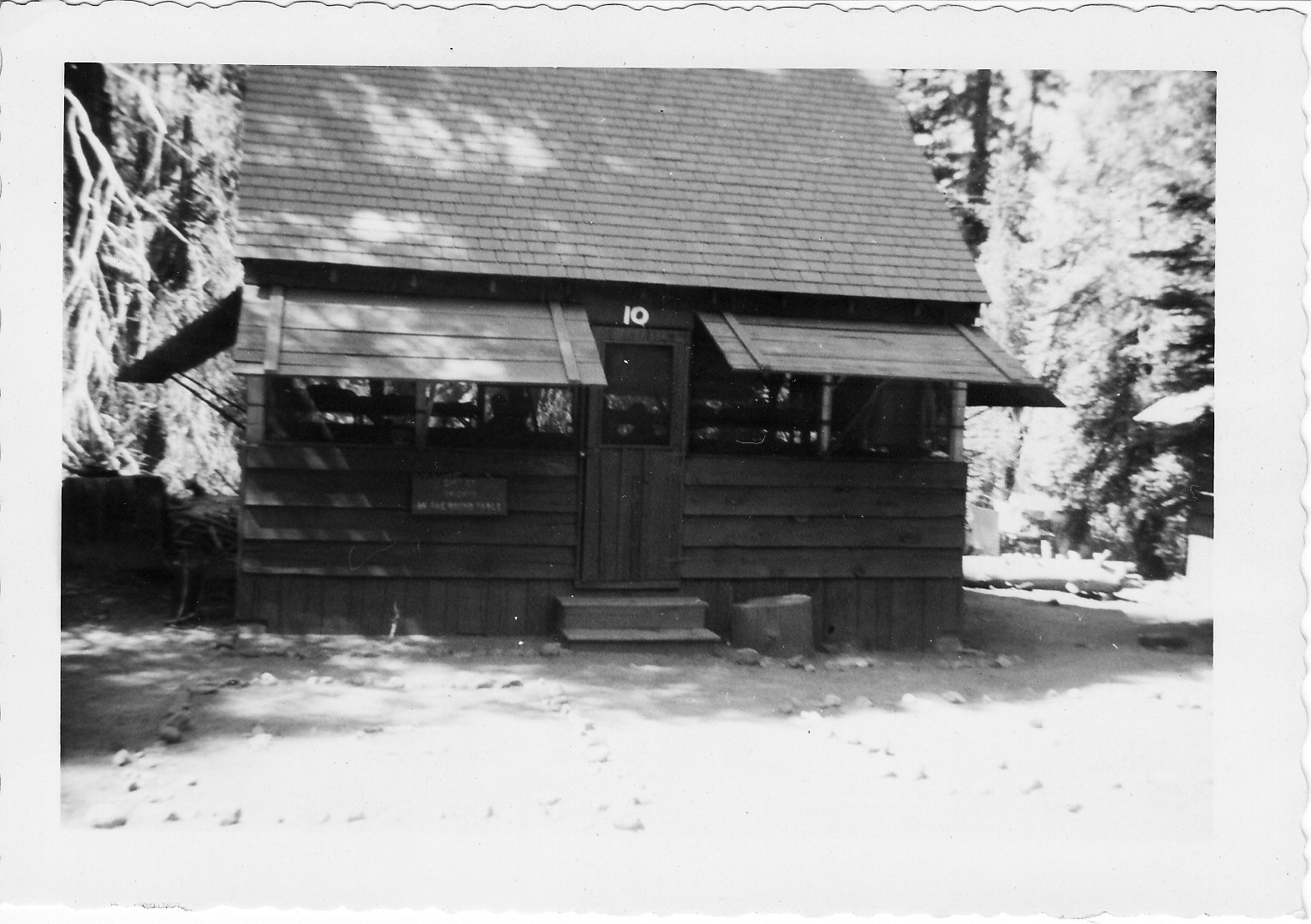
Cabin at YWCA Camp Mar-Y-Mac, Dinkey Creek, California, July 1957. Each cabin had 4 bunk beds for campers, plus a cot on either side of the door for a counselor and a teenage counselor-in-training.

Camp Mar-Y-Mac was a summer residence camp along Dinkey Creek in the Sierra Mountains east of Fresno, California, which functioned from 1951 until 1981. The camp was established by the YWCA of Fresno and named after Marian McKee, who was instrumental in its development.

== History ==
In the late 1940s, the Fresno YWCA raised funds through Christmas bazaars and other fundraisers. The camp opened in July 1951 with four cabins, costing $300 each, donated by Fresno clubs. The camp expanded over the years and eventually served 80 campers during each of six summer sessions. Typical camp activities were swimming, horseback riding, archery, arts and crafts, folk dancing, camp craft, camp lore, sports, music and drama. Camp brochures also list riflery, canoeing, world fellowship, conservation and astronomy. Campers could elect to take a day hike to Bald Mountain, an overnight in the meadow north of camp, and a 3-day wilderness outing. During the 70s, the camp program expanded to include a coed Macateer session for younger children and a 9-day Dinkey Lakes Back Pack trip for older campers. Mar-Y-Mac added Labor Day weekend camping for family groups. Churches and other organizations could also rent the camp for retreats or conferences.

In 1982, the almost certain prospect that a dam would be constructed led the YWCA to sell its buildings to the Kings River Conservation District. KRCD had plans to build a hydroelectric power-generating dam which would inundate over two miles (3 km) along the popular Dinkey Creek area with a 90,000-acre-foot (110,000,000 m^{3}) lake, drowning not only Camp Mar-Y-Mac but the Girl Scout Camp, Camp Fresno, and a public campground at Dinkey Creek. Legal challenges by environmental groups, especially SAFE (Sierra Association For the Environment), caused delays, but the dam progress was halted in the end by the lack of a buyer for the proposed electricity. The district had planned to use the Mar-Y-Mac cabins as housing for dam construction workers, but when the project fell through, all the buildings were bulldozed and the camp area was restored to its original primitive condition.

Since then, KRCD has given consideration to pursuing the planned dam on Dinkey Creek to provide electricity, but presently considers the project as "infeasible". An environmental group, Friends of the River, has been lobbying to have Dinkey Creek designated as a Wild and Scenic River, which would forever protect the area from damming. KRCD opposes this designation. Today, the only evidence that remains at Dinkey Creek of Camp Mar-Y-Mac is a triangle of rocks placed in the camp flagpole area and the outdoor chapel rock monument. (See links in References.)

== See also ==
- Hanshill
- YWCA Camp Davern
- List of summer camps
