= Fairview (Amherst, Virginia) =

Historic house in Virginia, United States

- U.S. National Register of Historic Places
- Virginia Landmarks Register
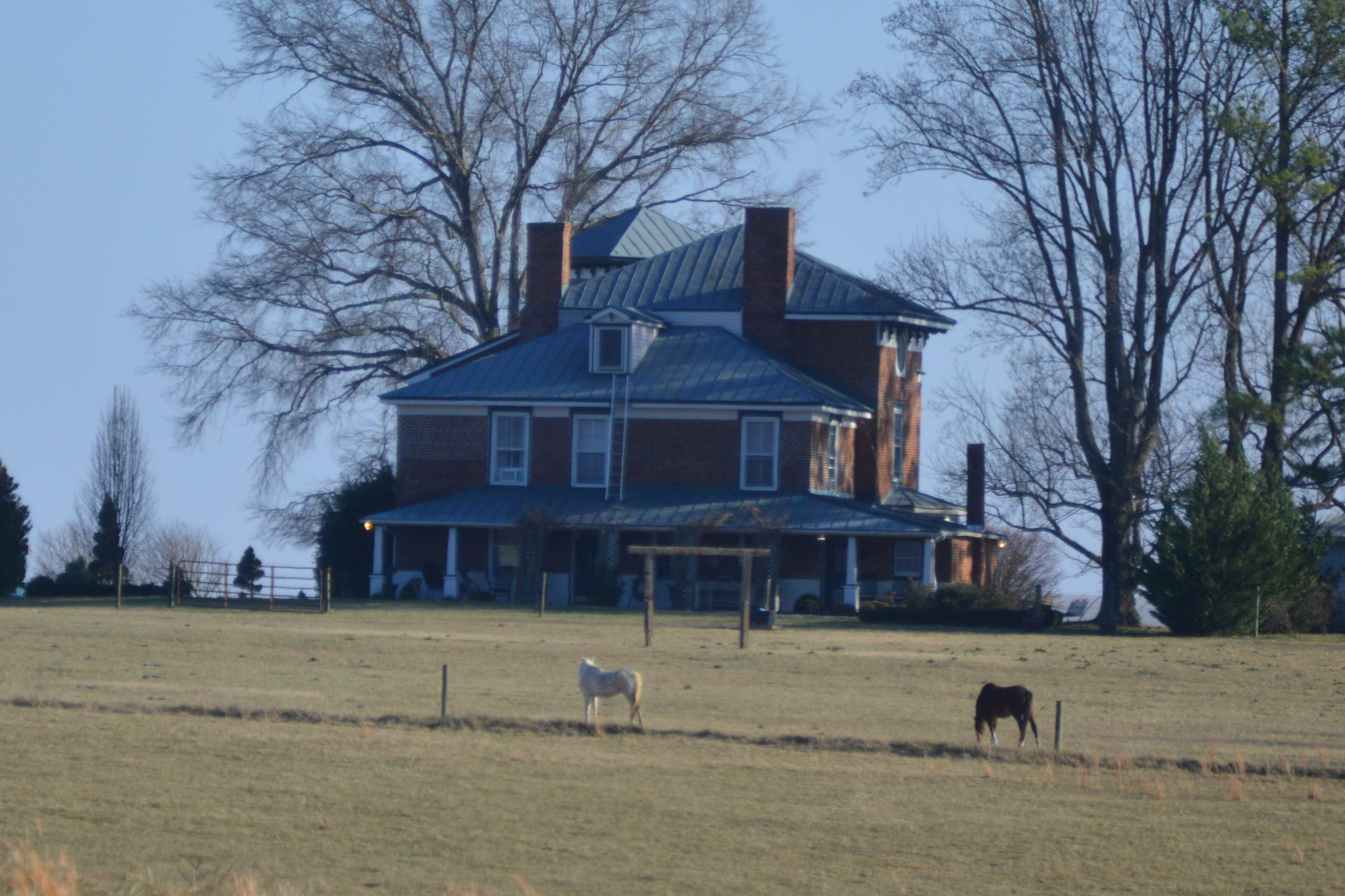
- View from Lowesville Road

- Location within Virginia Location within the United States
- Location: 2416 Lowesville Road, south of Lowesville, Virginia
- Coordinates: 37°41′58″N 79°3′56″W
- Area: 5.9 acres (2.4 ha)
- Built by: Nathan C. Taliaferro
- Architectural style: Italian Villa
- NRHP reference No.: 09000391
- VLR No.: 005-0006

Significant dates
- Added to NRHP: June 3, 2009
- Designated VLR: March 19, 2009

Fairview is a historic home located near Amherst, Amherst County, Virginia. It was built in 1867, and is a 2 1/2-story Italian Villa style brick dwelling. It has a three-story tower set at a 45-degree angle to the primary elevation. The house features a low-pitched roof with overhanging eaves, wide frieze with decorative brackets, arched windows, and a bay window. Also on the property are the contributing late-19th century smokehouse and tenant house (c. 1920).

It was added to the National Register of Historic Places in 2009.
