= Oak Lawn (Madison Heights, Virginia) =

Historic house in Virginia, United States

- U.S. National Register of Historic Places
- Virginia Landmarks Register
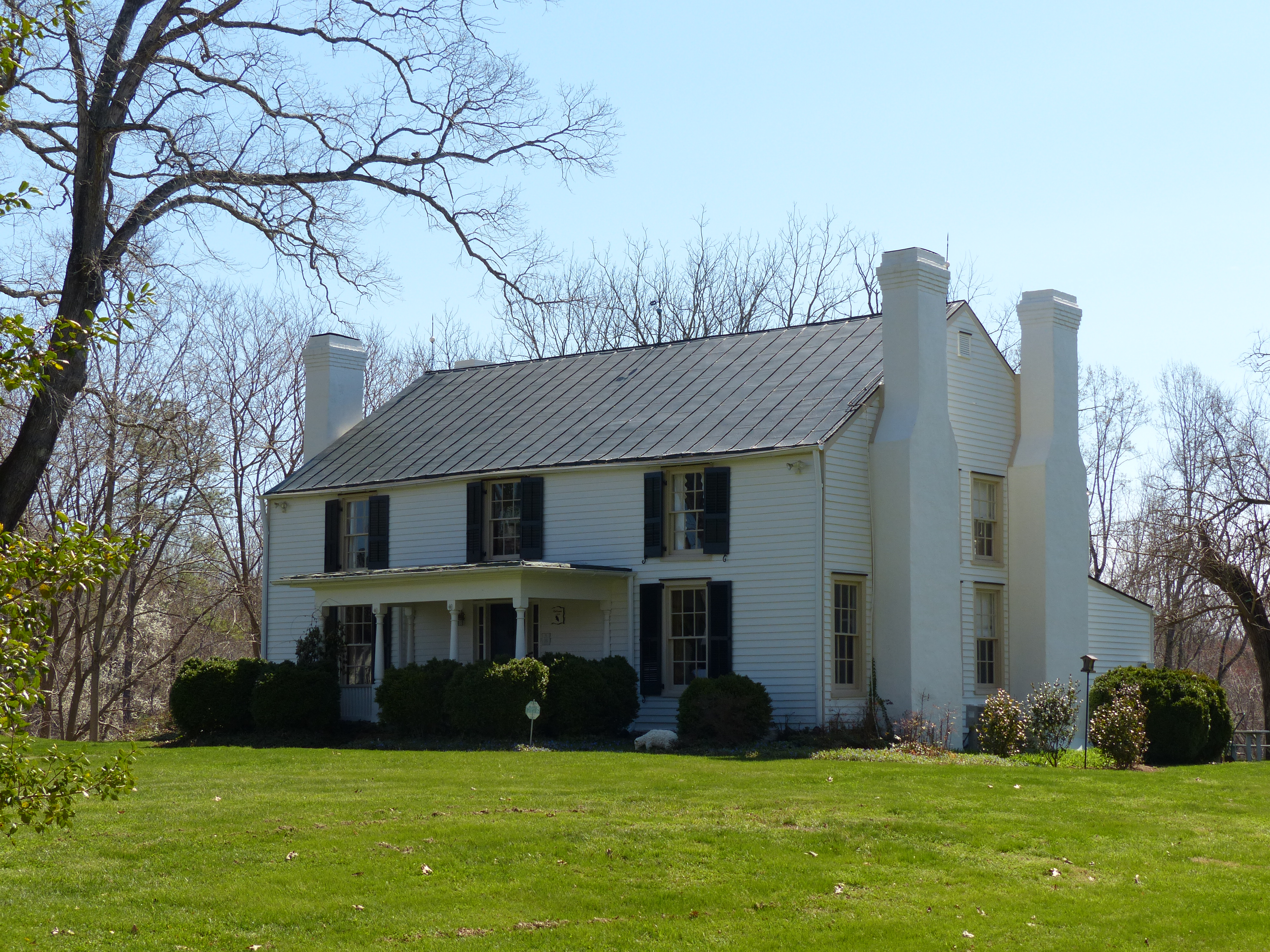

- Location within Virginia Location within the United States
- Location: 155 Winridge Dr., Madison Heights, Virginia
- Coordinates: 37°29′3″N 79°8′59″W
- Area: 6.2 acres (2.5 ha)
- Built: c. 1810, c. 1857
- Architectural style: Federal, Greek Revival
- NRHP reference No.: 06000802
- VLR No.: 005-5029

Significant dates
- Added to NRHP: September 6, 2006
- Designated VLR: June 8, 2006

Oak Lawn, also known as Burford House, is a historic home in Madison Heights, Amherst County, Virginia. Its original section was built around 1810, and enlarged around 1859. It is a two-story, three bay frame dwelling with weatherboard siding, four exterior end chimneys, and Federal and Greek Revival-style design elements. A late-19th century latticed well house is also on the property.

Oak Lawn was added to the National Register of Historic Places in 2008.
