= Norfolk Southern Six Mile Bridge No. 58 =

- U.S. National Register of Historic Places
- Virginia Landmarks Register
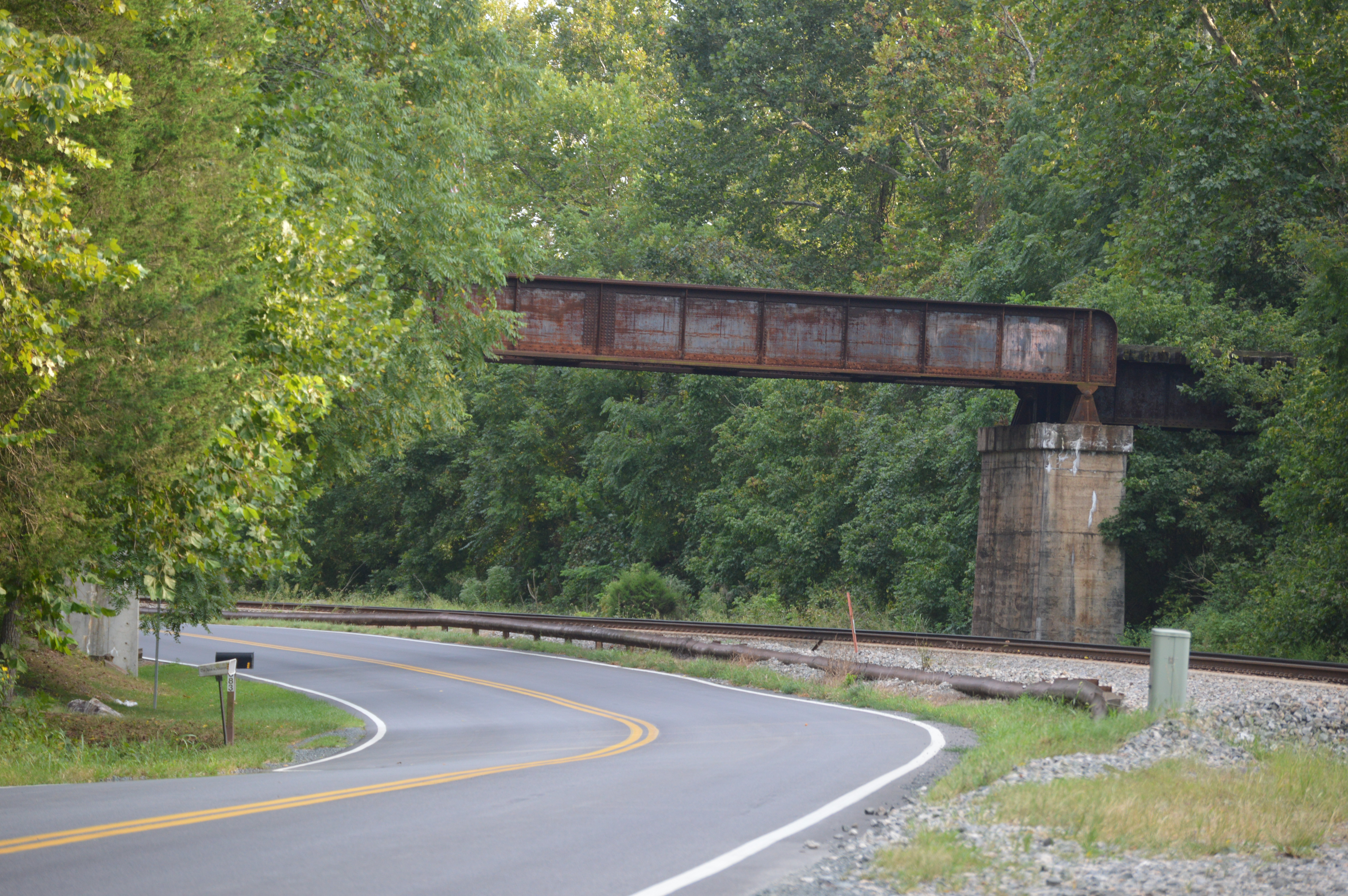
- Eastern section of the bridge, over Mount Athos Road

- Location within Virginia Location within the United States
- Location: Over the James River west of the junction of VA 726 and Norfolk & Western Railroad tracks, Lynchburg, Virginia
- Coordinates: 37°23′35″N 79°03′42″W
- Area: less than one acre
- Architectural style: Pratt Truss
- NRHP reference No.: 95001175
- VLR No.: 015-0352

Significant dates
- Added to NRHP: October 12, 1995
- Designated VLR: August 28, 1995

Norfolk Southern Six Mile Bridge No. 58, also known as Six Mile Bridge, is a historic Pratt truss railroad bridge located near Lynchburg in Amherst County and Campbell County, Virginia. The bridge was originally constructed around 1853. It was rebuilt or modified in 1866, 1870, 1886, 1899, 1920, 1934, and 1957 to accommodate ever-increasing rail traffic and heavier loads. The original bridge was built by the South Side Railroad during the construction of its line between Petersburg and Lynchburg, and later maintained by the Norfolk Southern Railway. During the American Civil War, the bridge and the rail approach to Lynchburg was protected by Fort Riverview. It provided rail service between 1853 and 1972. It has been owned by the Mount Athos Regional Museum and Information Center, Inc., since 1993.

The bridge was added to the National Register of Historic Places in 1997.

== See also ==
- List of bridges on the National Register of Historic Places in Virginia
