= Bear Mountain Indian Mission School =

Historic school in Virginia, United States

- U.S. National Register of Historic Places
- Virginia Landmarks Register
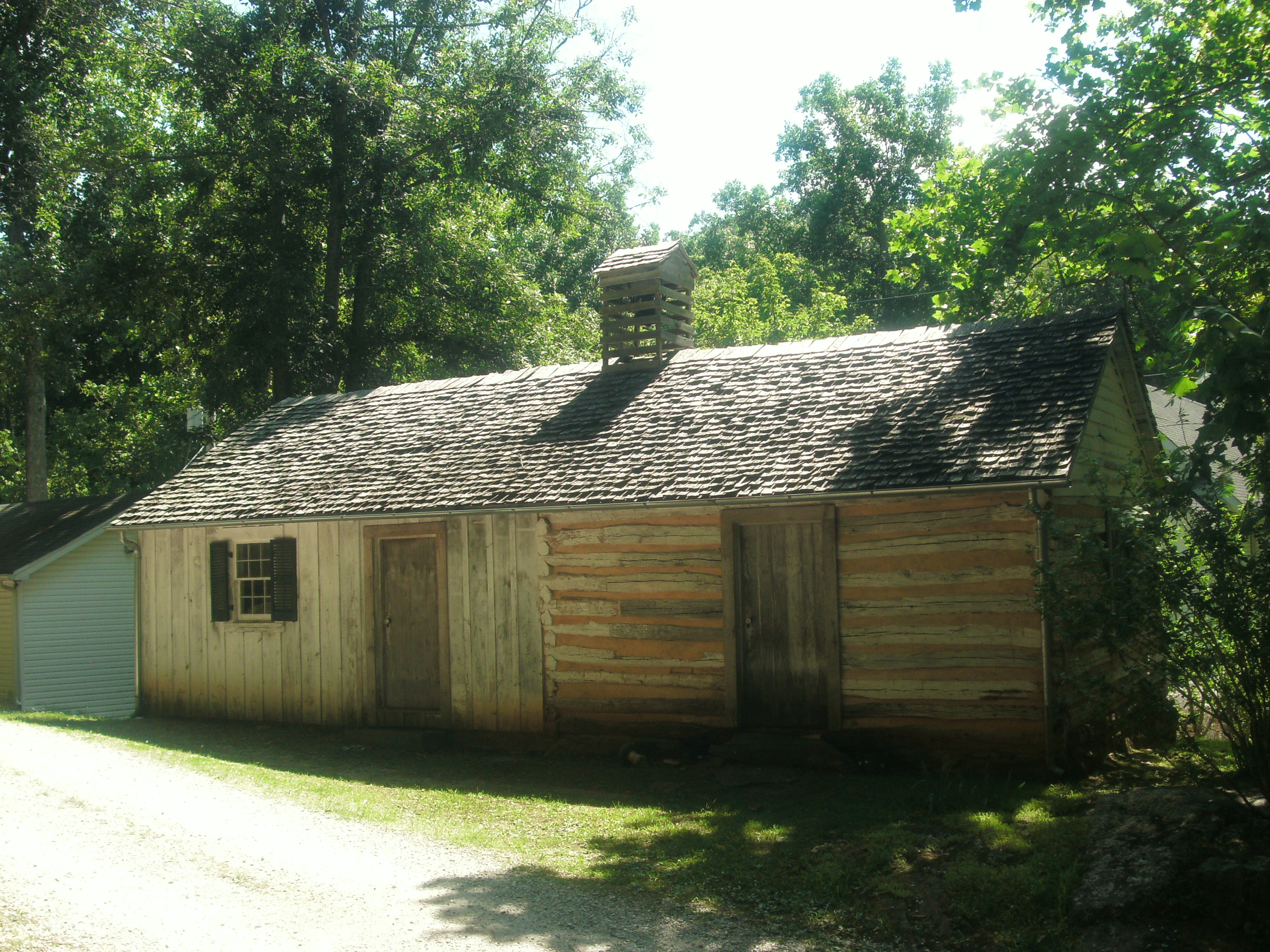
- Bear Mountain Indian Mission School in July, 2016

- Location within Virginia Location within the United States
- Location: Junction of VA 643 and VA 780, southwest corner, near Amherst, Virginia
- Coordinates: 37°34′22″N 79°7′38″W
- Area: 0.5 acres (0.20 ha)
- Built: 1868, 1930
- Architectural style: horizontal log
- NRHP reference No.: 97000152
- VLR No.: 005-0230

Significant dates
- Added to NRHP: February 21, 1997
- Designated VLR: September 18, 1996

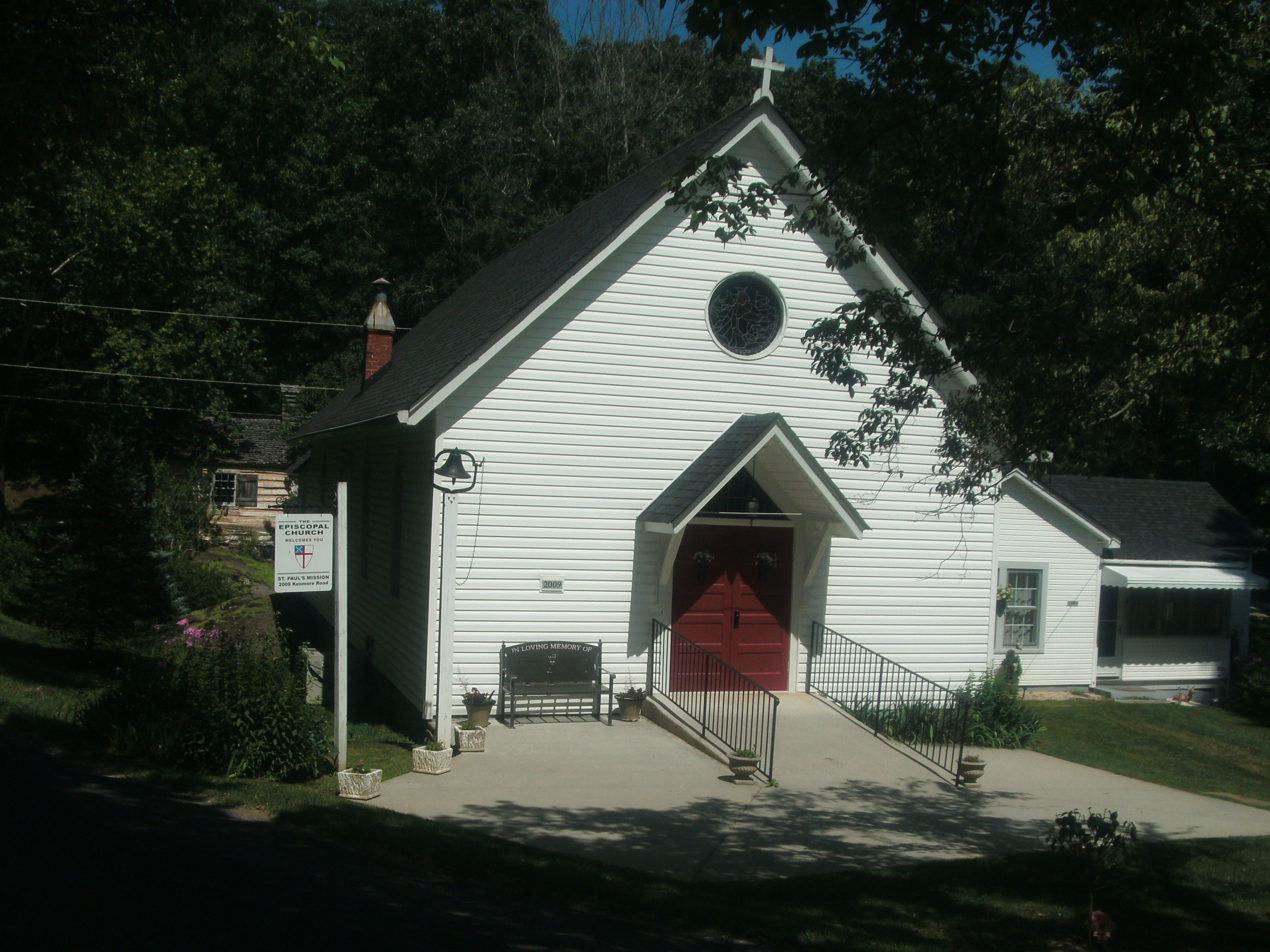
St. Paul's Episcopal Church, July, 2016

Bear Mountain Indian Mission School is a historic Native American missionary school in Amherst, Virginia.

The school was used by the Monacan tribe since:

[i]n 1868, [when] a parcel of land was donated for a meeting place for the Indian people. At the time, churches and schools were provided for whites and for blacks, but not for Indians. Originally, a wooden arbor served as the meeting place, and itinerant ministers began to hold Baptist and Methodist services there. Shortly thereafter, a log building was built, to be used for the meeting place. The new church served about 350 Indian people. This building later became the Indian mission school, which still stands at the foot of Bear Mountain.

The school building was built in 1868, and is a single-story, one-room, horizontal log building. A frame addition was built in 1908. The "New School," dating to the 1930s, is a plain frame building sheathed in weatherboard. Associated with the school is St. Paul's Episcopal Church, a rectangular wood-frame building with Gothic style detailing. It was built in 1930, after the original mission church was destroyed by fire. A mission worker's house is also extant, a small "L"-plan wood frame dwelling.

The buildings were added to the National Register of Historic Places in 1997. Today, the log building houses the tribal museum.
