= Fort Riverview =

Archaeological site in Virginia, United States

- Fort Riverview (44AH91 and 44AH195)
- U.S. National Register of Historic Places
- Virginia Landmarks Register
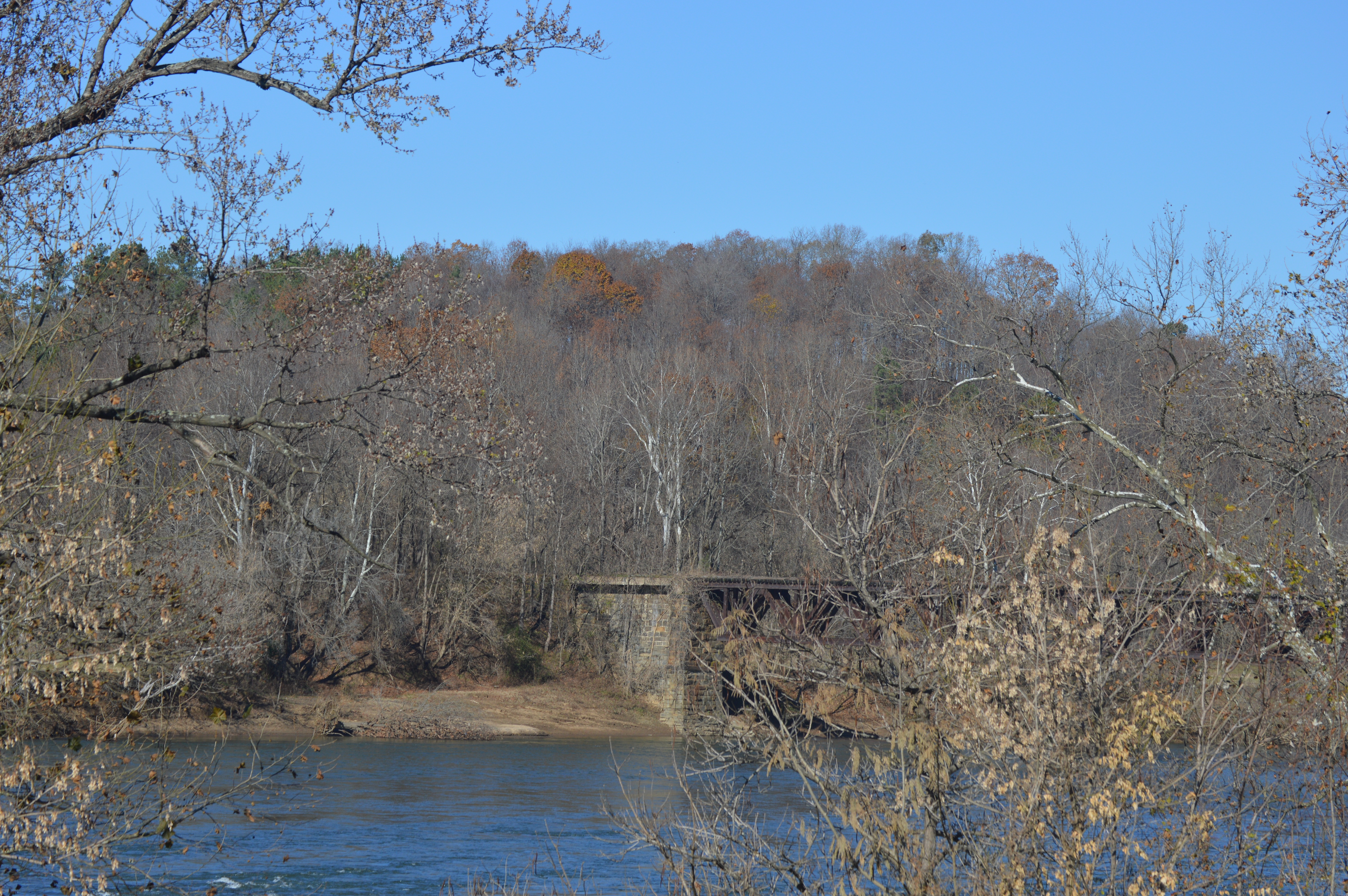
- Distant view from the southeast

- Location within Virginia Location within the United States
- Nearest city: Madison Heights, Virginia
- Coordinates: 37°23′45″N 79°3′55″W
- Area: 27 acres (11 ha)
- NRHP reference No.: 89001921
- VLR No.: 005-0185

Significant dates
- Added to NRHP: November 16, 1989
- Designated VLR: April 18, 1989

Fort Riverview is a historic archaeological site located near Madison Heights, Amherst County, Virginia. It is an American Civil War redoubt built by the Confederate States Army about 1863 to protect Six Mile Bridge and the James River and Kanawha Canal system along the James River. Fort Riverview served as part of the outer defense system for Lynchburg, Virginia. The protection of this bridge was vital to the Confederacy as it carried supplies for General Robert E. Lee. Since Lynchburg served as a major supply, staging, and hospital center, Fort Riverview was strategically located to protect this critical center.

It was added to the National Register of Historic Places in 1989.
