= The Glebe (Amherst, Virginia) =

Historic house in Virginia, United States

- U.S. National Register of Historic Places
- Virginia Landmarks Register
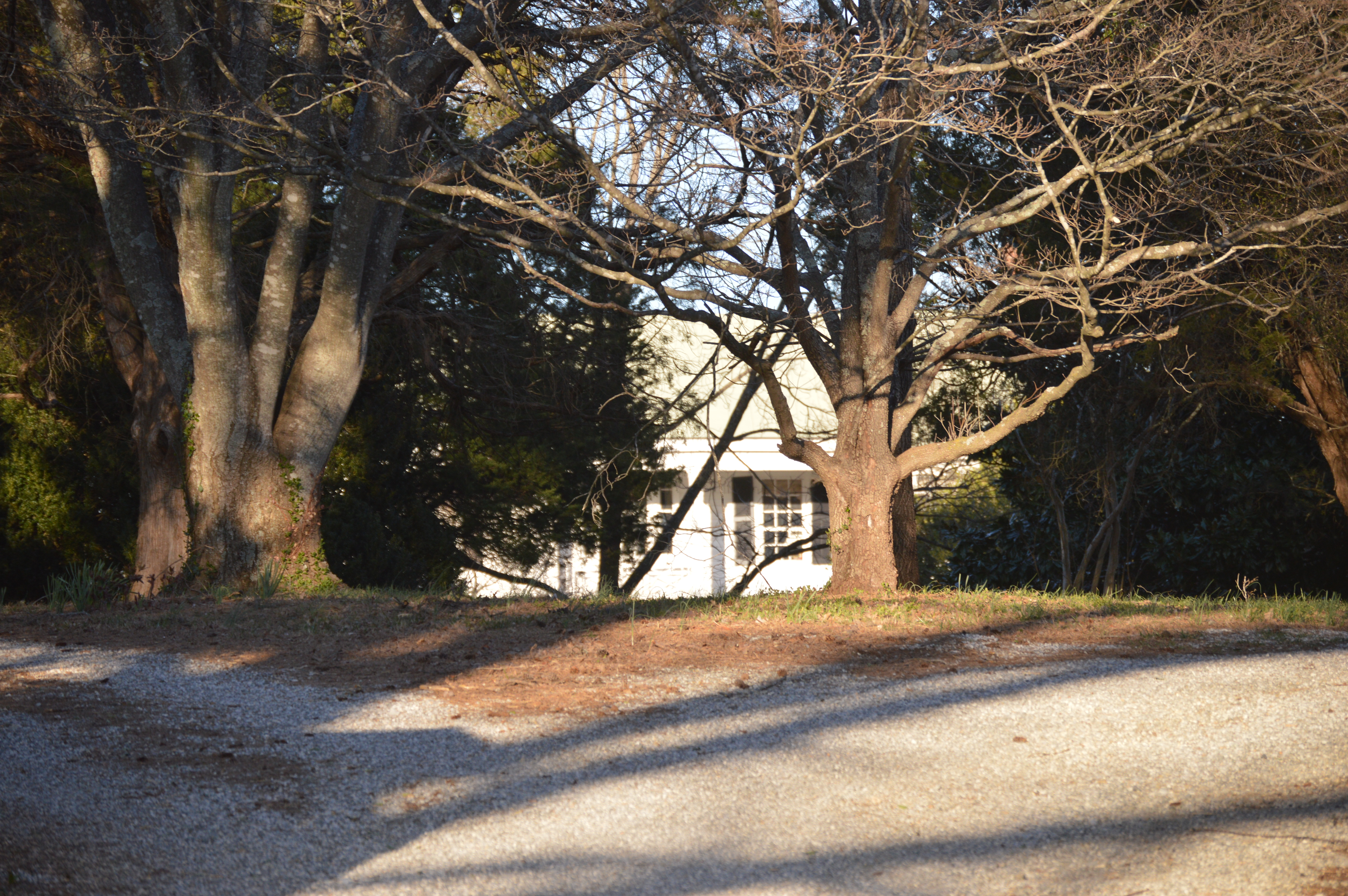
- Roadside view

- Location within Virginia Location within the United States
- Location: 156 State Route 151, near Amherst, Virginia
- Coordinates: 37°37′23″N 79°00′50″W
- Area: 20.6 acres (8.3 ha)
- Built: c. 1762, c. 1825
- Built by: Anglican Parish of Amherst County
- Architectural style: Federal, Colonial
- NRHP reference No.: 08000419
- VLR No.: 005-0010

Significant dates
- Added to NRHP: May 15, 2008
- Designated VLR: March 20, 2008

The Glebe, also known as Minor Hall, is a historic Glebe House located near Amherst, Amherst County, Virginia. The original section, now the rear ell, was built about 1762, with the two-story, five-bay main block dated to about 1825. Other additions are the kitchen wing, added about 1919; two porches attached to the south and east elevations and added about 1937; and the laundry room wing, built in the second half of the 20th century. Also on the property are the contributing garage (c. 1900), tool shed (c. 1900), and site of a 20th-century barn. It was built by the Reverend Ichabod Camp, the only Anglican minister to serve Amherst Parish and the only Anglican minister to occupy The Glebe while it was owned by Amherst Parish between 1762 and 1780.

It was added to the National Register of Historic Places. In this same year, a 50'x25' swimming pool set surrounded by concrete added in the rear of the house approximately 30' away.
