= Speed the Plough (Monroe, Virginia) =

- U.S. National Register of Historic Places
- U.S. Historic district
- Virginia Landmarks Register
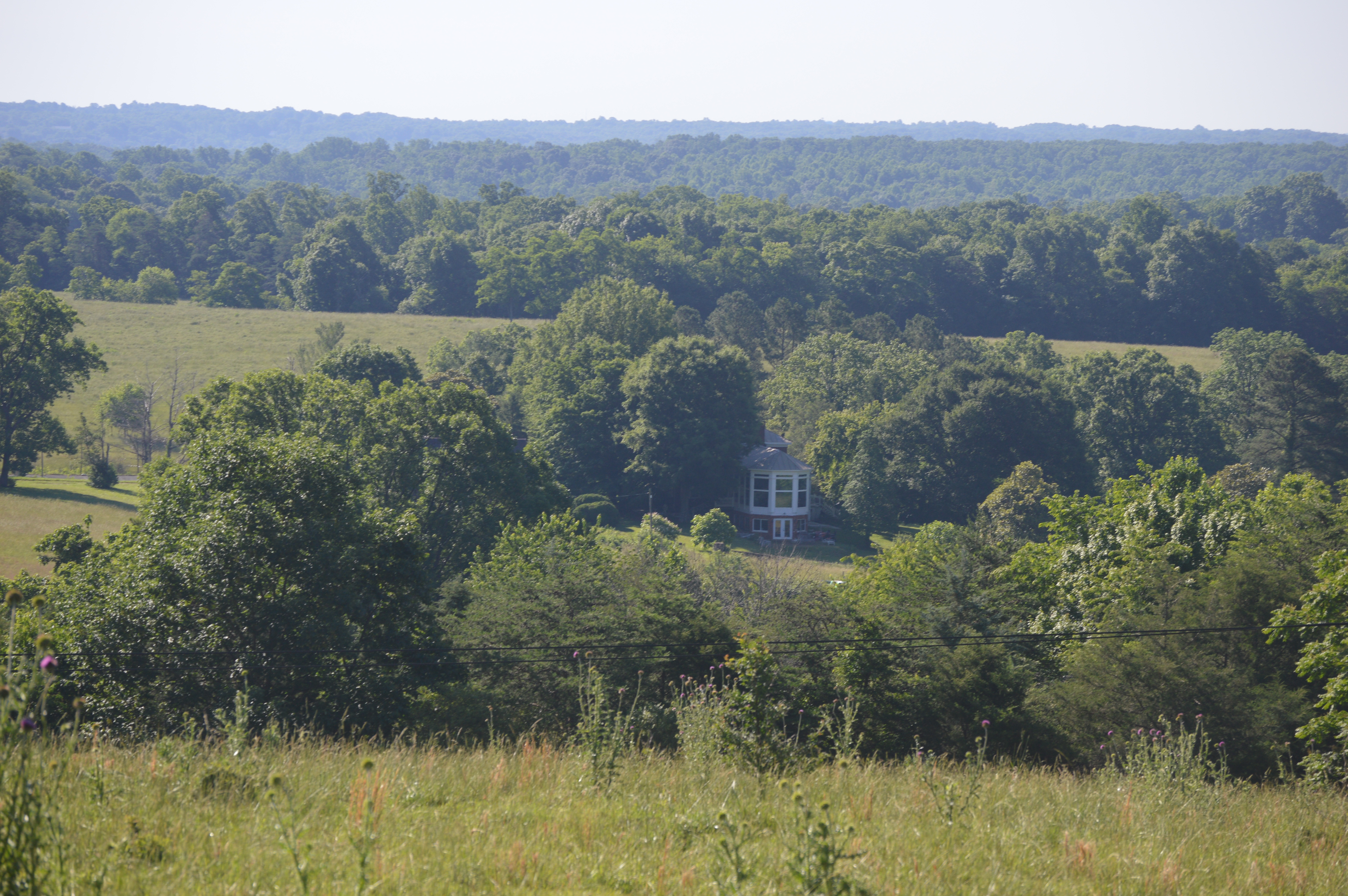
- Distant view from Ambrose Rucker Road

- Location within Virginia
- Location: 389 Fair Lea Ln., Monroe, Virginia
- Coordinates: 37°31′59″N 79°11′28″W
- Area: 294 acres (119 ha)
- Built: 1850
- Architect: William A. Dearing, et al.
- Architectural style: Greek Revival, Tudor Revival
- NRHP reference No.: 07000391
- VLR No.: 005-0040

Significant dates
- Added to NRHP: April 30, 2007
- Designated VLR: March 7, 2007

Speed the Plough is a farm in Amherst County, Virginia near the village of Elon, listed on the National Register of Historic Places. The farm represents a succession of farm buildings from about 1799 to 1940. Its main house, a two-story brick structure, was built for William Dearing (1820–1862). Dearing held about fourteen slaves on the farm prior to the American Civil War. The property was sold out of the Dearing family about 1915 and the land was converted to an orchard by the Montrose Fruit Company, abandoning the house and most buildings. The land and house were later acquired by Rowland Lea (1872–1960). His partner, George Stevens (1868–1941), built a stone summer residence, the Rock Cottage, on the property. Several other buildings have been renovated for residential use and comprise a small village in what are now pasture lands.

== Description ==
=== Main house ===
The main house was built about 1850, a two-story brick single-pile Greek Revival building in the I-house pattern with a main block and a one-story ell to the rear. The interior follows a central-hall plan, with a living room to the west of the hall and a dining room to the east. The house was expanded in 1927 by the Lea family with a porch to the front and a one-story addition on the north with a sitting room-dining room and a kitchen.

=== Rock Cottage ===
The Rock Cottage was built by local builder Samuel Belk about 1933 at some distance from the main house. George Stevens engaged an architect from New York to design the house as an English hunting lodge on the site of the farm's old kitchen. The 1 1/2-story house is built in Tudor Revival style in stone. The L-shaped house is built around a central chimney. The main room is a "great hall" that functions as a living and dining room, with half-timbered interior walls and exposed roof beams. The room is furnished with bookshelves, one of which opens to reveal a hidden spiral iron stair to the basement. A kitchen is adjacent. The stair hall has stairs to the upper level and the basement. A master bedroom suite lies beyond the stair hall on the main level. There are two bedrooms and two baths on the upper levels. The basement features a large room with a fireplace under the great hall suitable for dancing, while other rooms were used for entertainment. A matching garage is nearby, with space for three cars with a basement beneath. An apartment is attached. The basement was to be used as a workroom and includes a fireplace. The apartment comprises two rooms with a bathroom. A basement, originally used to store wood for heating, has been converted to additional living space. The entire complex is surrounded by a dry-laid stone wall.

=== Other structures ===
A chicken house, dating to about 1933, is set between the garage and the main house. The one-story structure is built of fieldstone. The 1933 bank barn is set on a concrete foundation with a small milking parlor and accommodations for horses on the lower level and a farm equipment storage loft above. A small apartment is incorporated into the southwest corner. A circa 1940 tenant house made of concrete block is located to the southwest of the barn. A 1933 pump house, of wood-frame construction on a concrete foundation, has been enlarged for use as a dwelling. A tennis court, which replaced an old barn, is nearby, built about 1933 with a clay court, now replaced with asphalt. Other structures include a concrete water reservoir and storage sheds.

The springhouse is the oldest structure on the farm, built around 1799 and restored in 2006. It is a dry-laid fieldstone structure. The site also includes the Dearing family cemetery, surrounded by a wrought iron fence and comprising the graves of William Dearing (d. 1862), his wife Jane (d.1910) and son Clarence (d.1907). A small African-American cemetery features a few headstones and rock markers. A second African-American cemetery is believed to exist, but its location is unknown.

== History ==
The property, at the base of Tobacco Row Mountain, was first owned by Duncan Graham of Caroline County, who sold 710 acres (290 ha) to George McDaniel in 1788, who in turn sold 353 acres (143 ha) to Philip Burton in 1799. After an inheritance dispute, the property, now 282 acres (114 ha), passed to John R. Irvine of Bedford, Virginia, who sold it in 1835 to Charles Ellis of Richmond. The land is believed to have been used to cultivate tobacco for Ellis' company, Ellis and Allan. Ellis' partner John Allan was the foster father of Edgar Allan Poe. William Alexander Dearing acquired the land from Ellis' estate in 1850. By then the property was already known as "Speed the Plough," a saying associated with success or luck in farming, and the name of a fifteenth-century English song.

Dearing raised tobacco and corn on the property, building the house about 1850 and other structures through 1856. Dearing was killed in 1862 at age 42 in a feud with neighbor Valentine Rucker. For unknown reasons Dearing carried a grudge against Rucker and ambushed him, firing and failing to kill Rucker with his gun. Rucker returned fire, fatally wounding Dearing. Rucker was tried and acquitted of murder. Dearing's widow Jane managed the farm, raising three children. Jane died in 1910, and her only surviving child, Addie Dearing Cox, sold the land to the Montrose Fruit Company of New York in 1915. The land was planted with apples and peaches. In 1927 the company had to divest itself of the land and sold the property to the Montrose Fruit Company's president's sister and her husband, Theodora Stevens Lea and Rowland Lea, who had lived on a nearby farm from 1915. The Leas were active locally, and many family members moved to Virginia to help manage the farm, including Phyllis Lea and Theodora Lea Girling, Rowland Lea's sisters, who lived at neighboring "Fairlea." Another brother of Theodora visited the farm. George C. Stevens was a New York representative of Lloyd's of London, and liked the place so much that he entered into partnership with the Leas and built the Rock Cottage. The farm eventually passed to Philip Girling, son of Theodora Lea Girling and the orchard manager, whose family continues to own the land.

The property is operated as a bed and breakfast.

The farm was placed on the National Register of Historic Places on April 30, 2007.
