= Vesuvius, Virginia =

- Unincorporated community
- Location within Virginia Location within the United States
- Coordinates: 37°54′22″N 79°11′50″W
- Country: United States
- State: Virginia
- County: Rockbridge
- Elevation: 1,427 ft (435 m)
- Time zone: UTC−5 (Eastern (EST))
  - Summer (DST): UTC−4 (EDT)
- ZIP code: 24483
- Area code: 540
- GNIS feature ID: 1498400

Vesuvius is an unincorporated community in Rockbridge County, Virginia, United States. Vesuvius is located on Virginia State Route 56, 99 miles (159 km) northwest of Richmond. Vesuvius has a post office with ZIP code 24483.

Macedonia Methodist Church in Amherst County was added to the National Register of Historic Places in 2012.
