= Gladstone, Virginia =

Unincorporated community in Virginia, United States

Coordinates: 37°32′49″N 78°50′58″W

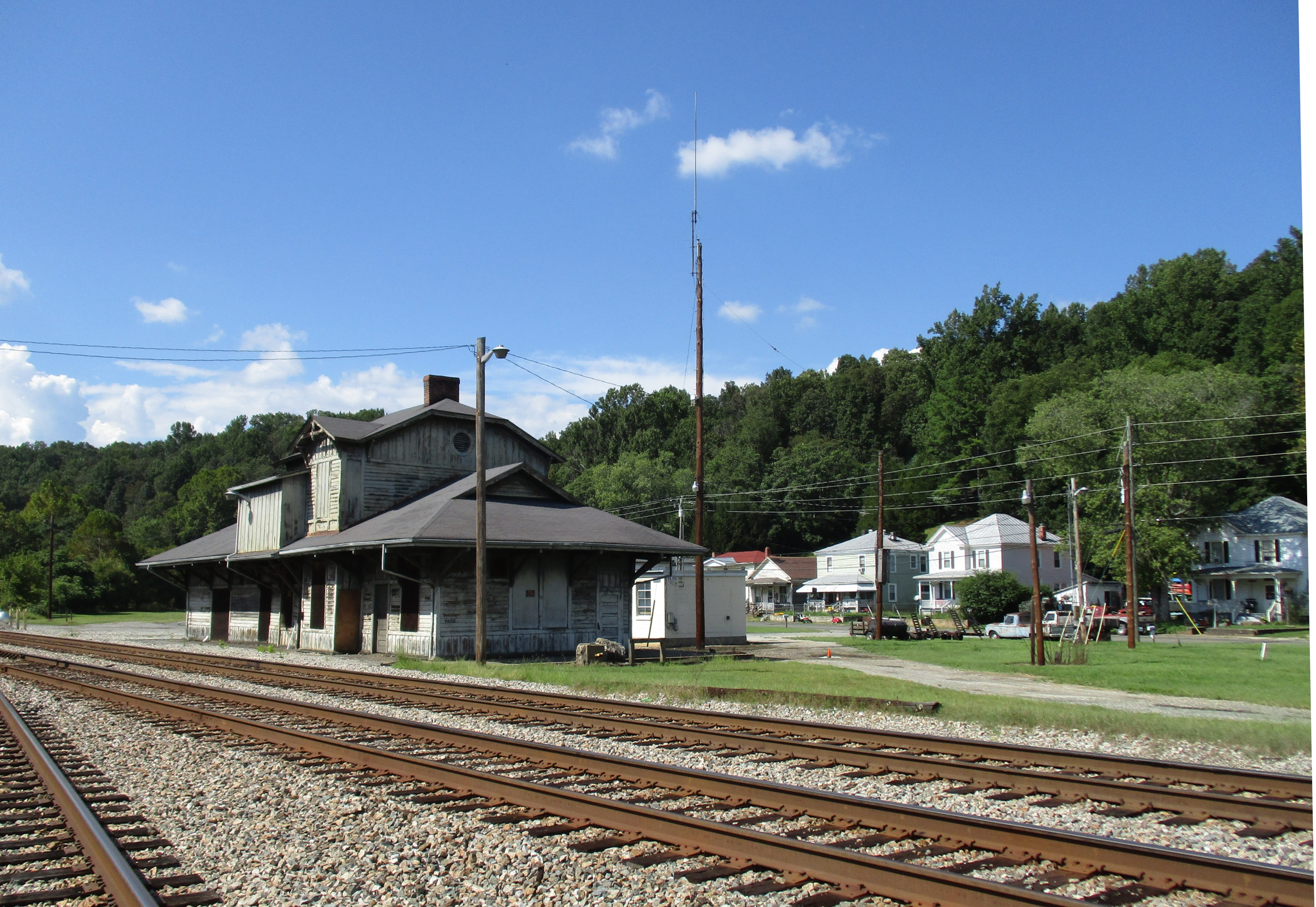
Gladstone Depot with homes in background

Gladstone is an unincorporated community in Nelson County, Virginia, United States.

Edge Hill was added to the National Register of Historic Places in 2008.
