= Hite Store =

Historic commercial building in Virginia, United States

- U.S. National Register of Historic Places
- Virginia Landmarks Register
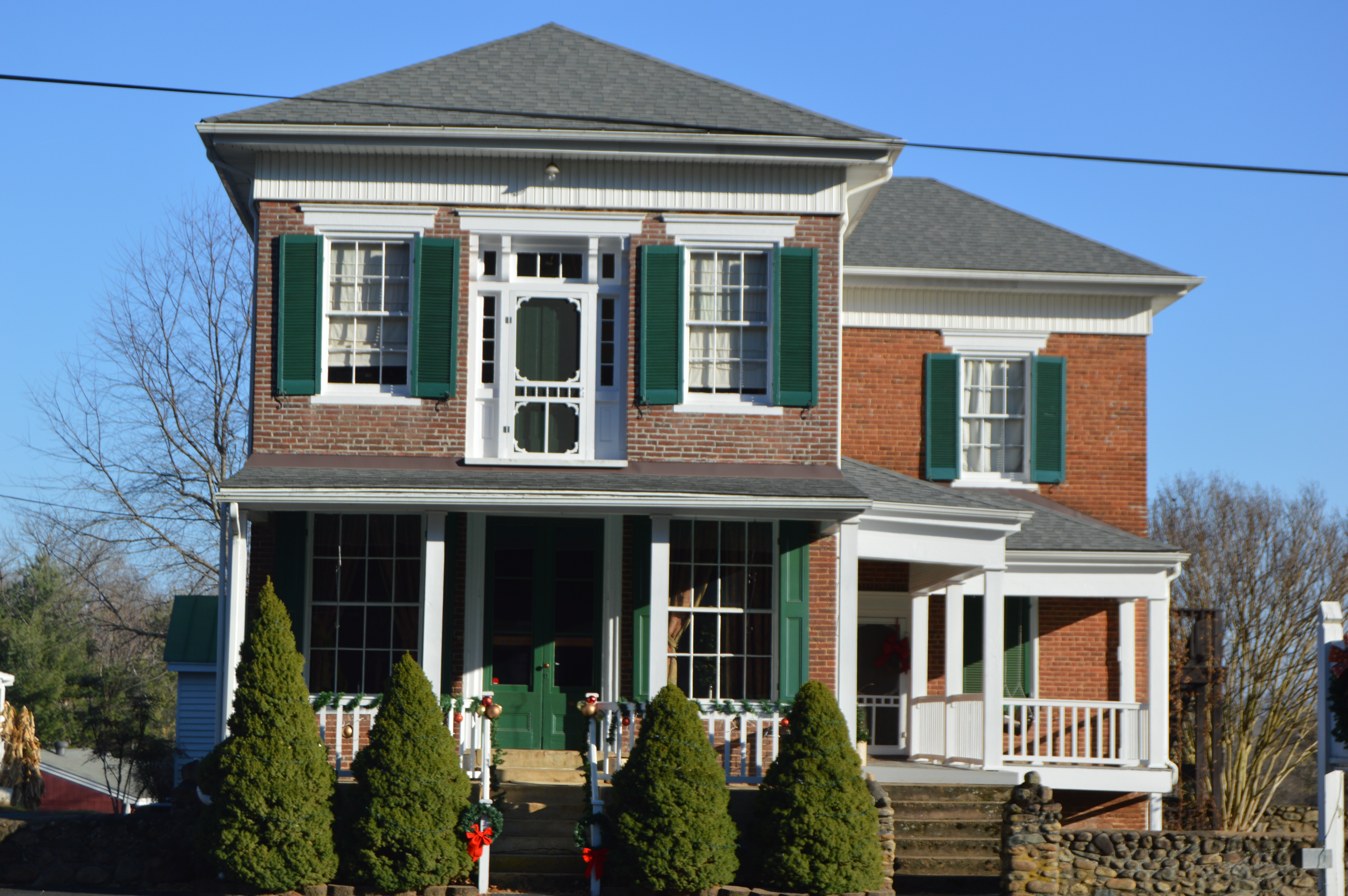
- Front of the store

- Location within Virginia Location within the United States
- Location: 0.25 miles (0.40 km) south of the junction of Lowesville and Woodson Roads at Lowesville, Virginia
- Coordinates: 37°43′6.5″N 79°4′1″W
- Area: 2.7 acres (1.1 ha)
- Built: 1869
- Architectural style: Greek Revival
- NRHP reference No.: 97000487
- VLR No.: 005-0058

Significant dates
- Added to NRHP: June 6, 1997
- Designated VLR: March 19, 1997

Hite Store, also known as Riverview, is a historic general store in Lowesville, Amherst County, Virginia. It was built in 1869, and is a two-story, L-shaped brick building in the Greek Revival style. It has a hipped roof and features a full-width porch. Contributing outbuildings are three frame-constructed, gable-roofed and weatherboard-clad one-story buildings, and a gable-roofed log barn.

It was added to the National Register of Historic Places in 1997.
