= Galt's Mill Complex =

- U.S. National Register of Historic Places
- U.S. Historic district
- Virginia Landmarks Register
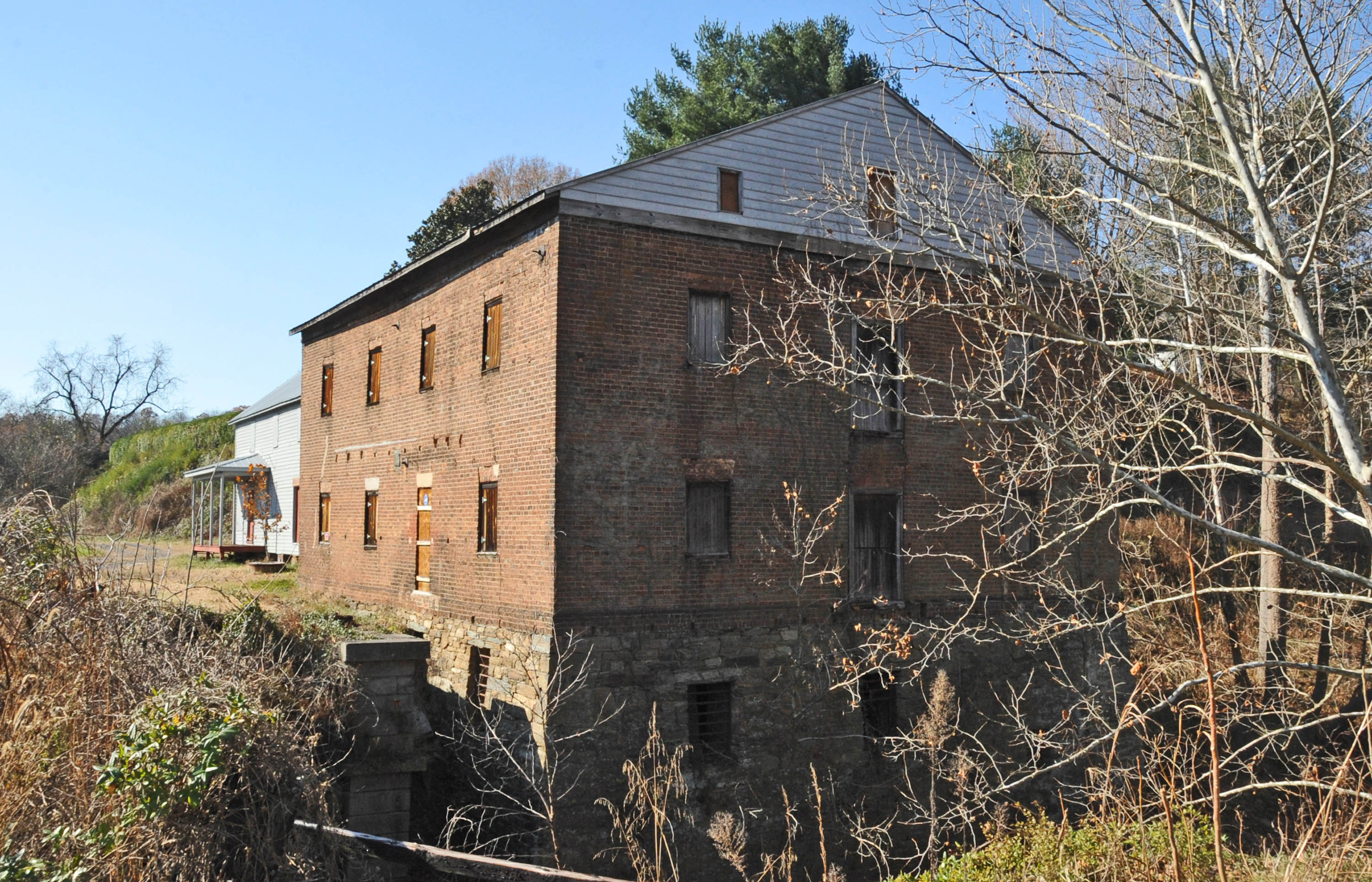

- Location within Virginia Location within the United States
- Location: 1133 Galt's Mill Rd., near Madison Heights, Virginia
- Coordinates: 37°26′35″N 79°05′11″W
- Area: 535 acres (217 ha)
- Built: 1813
- Built by: Galt, William; Turner, Edgar J.
- NRHP reference No.: 09000791
- VLR No.: 005-5037

Significant dates
- Added to NRHP: September 30, 2009
- Designated VLR: June 18, 2009

Galt's Mill Complex is a national historic district located near Madison Heights, Amherst County, Virginia. It encompasses 21 contributing buildings, 1 contributing site, 8 contributing structures, and 1 contributing object associated with a rural mill village. The buildings surround the masonry-constructed Galt's Mill, and are a variety of vernacular log or wood-frame structures. The mill was built in 1813, and is a two-story, brick structures. It was originally 5 1/5-stories, but lowered to its present height about 1950. The mill remained in operation until 1956. A store building was added about 1900. Other notable resources include the Aqueduct, Train Bridge (c. 1838), Railroad (c. 1870), Boathouse (c. 1900), Home House (c. 1813), Miller's House (c. 1900), and Millrace and Dam Ruins (c. 1813 and 1914).

It was added to the National Register of Historic Places in 2009.
