= Monroe, Virginia =

Unincorporated community in Virginia, United States

- Unincorporated community
- Location within Virginia Location within the United States
- Coordinates: 37°30′08″N 79°07′40″W
- Country: United States
- State: Virginia
- County: Amherst
- Elevation: 718 ft (219 m)
- Time zone: UTC-5 (Eastern (EST))
  - Summer (DST): UTC-4 (EDT)
- Area code: 434
- GNIS feature ID: 1499756

Monroe is an unincorporated community in Amherst County, Virginia, United States. Monroe is located along U.S. Route 29, 6.1 miles (9.8 km) north of Lynchburg.

Speed the Plough, a farm located in Monroe, was added to the National Register of Historic Places in 2007.

== Climate ==
The climate in this area is characterized by hot, humid summers and generally mild to cool winters. According to the Köppen Climate Classification system, Monroe has a humid subtropical climate, abbreviated "Cfa" on climate maps.

== In popular culture ==
Monroe is mentioned in a well-known American railroad song, "Wreck of the Old 97". It was written in memory of a 1903 rail disaster, when the Fast Mail, en route from Monroe to Spencer, North Carolina, derailed at the Stillhouse Trestle near Danville.
