= Edge Hill (Gladstone, Virginia) =

Historic house in Virginia, United States

- U.S. National Register of Historic Places
- Virginia Landmarks Register
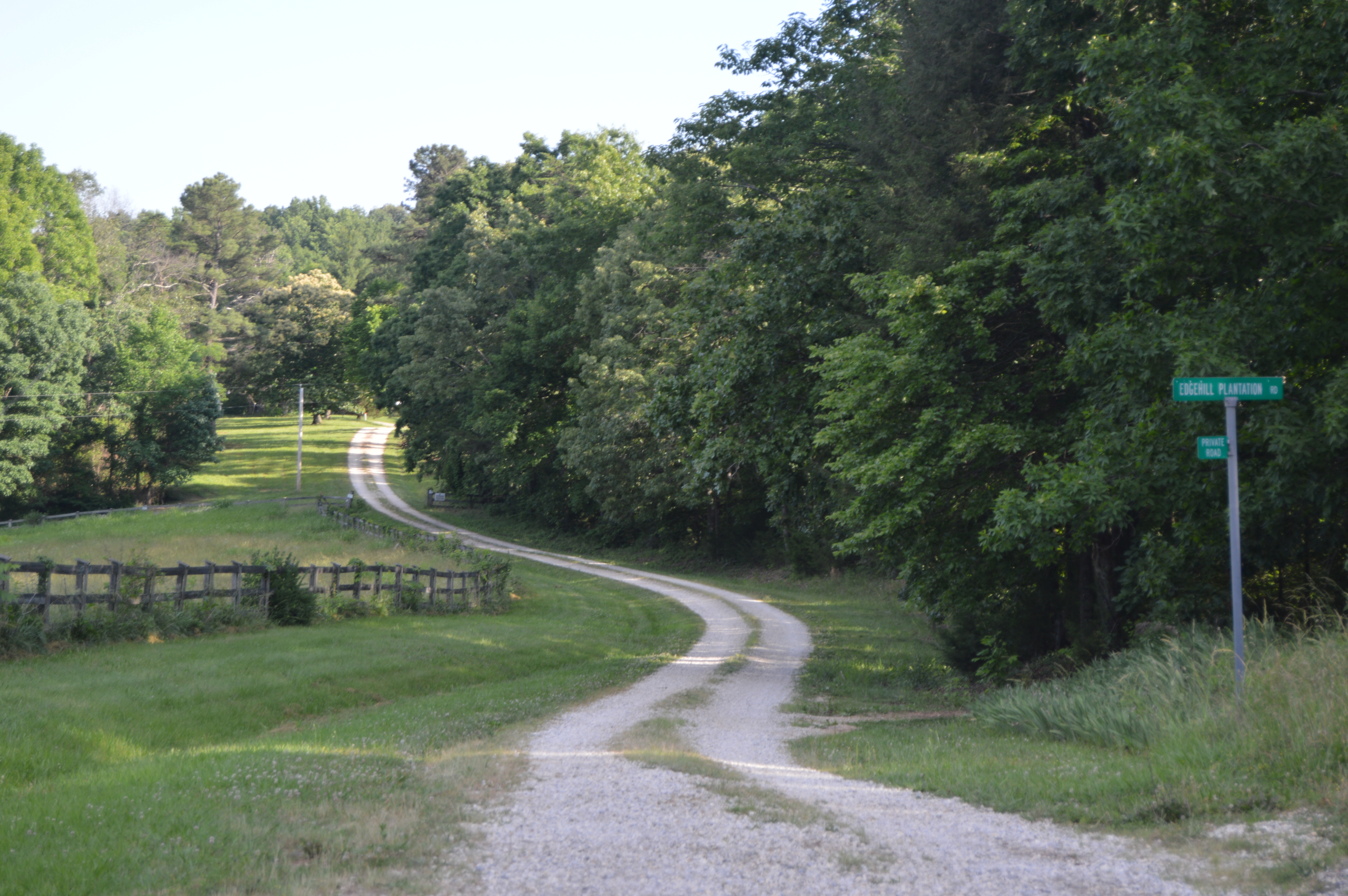
- Entrance

- Location within Virginia Location within the United States
- Location: 1380 Edgehill Plantation Rd., near Gladstone, Virginia
- Coordinates: 37°30′42″N 78°54′30″W
- Area: 71 acres (29 ha)
- Built: c. 1801, 1833, 1947
- Built by: Isaac W. Walker, Pendleton S. Clark
- Architectural style: Federal
- NRHP reference No.: 08000418
- VLR No.: 005-0005

Significant dates
- Added to NRHP: May 15, 2008
- Designated VLR: March 20, 2008

Edge Hill, also known as Green Hills and Walker's Ford Sawmill, is a historic home and farm located in Amherst County, Virginia, near Gladstone. The main house was built in 1833, and is a two-story, brick I-house in the Federal-style. It has a standing seam metal gable roof and two interior end chimneys. Attached to the house by a former breezeway enclosed in 1947, is the former overseer's house, built about 1801. Also on the property are the contributing office, pumphouse, corncrib, and log-framed barn all dated to about 1833. Below the bluff, adjacent to the railroad and near the James River, are four additional outbuildings: a sawmill and shed (1865), tobacco barn, and a post and beam two-story cattle barn (c. 1947). Archaeological sites on the farm include slave quarters, additional outbuildings and a slave cemetery.

It was added to the National Register of Historic Places in 2008.
