= Macedonia Methodist Church =

Historic church in Virginia, United States

- U.S. National Register of Historic Places
- Virginia Landmarks Register
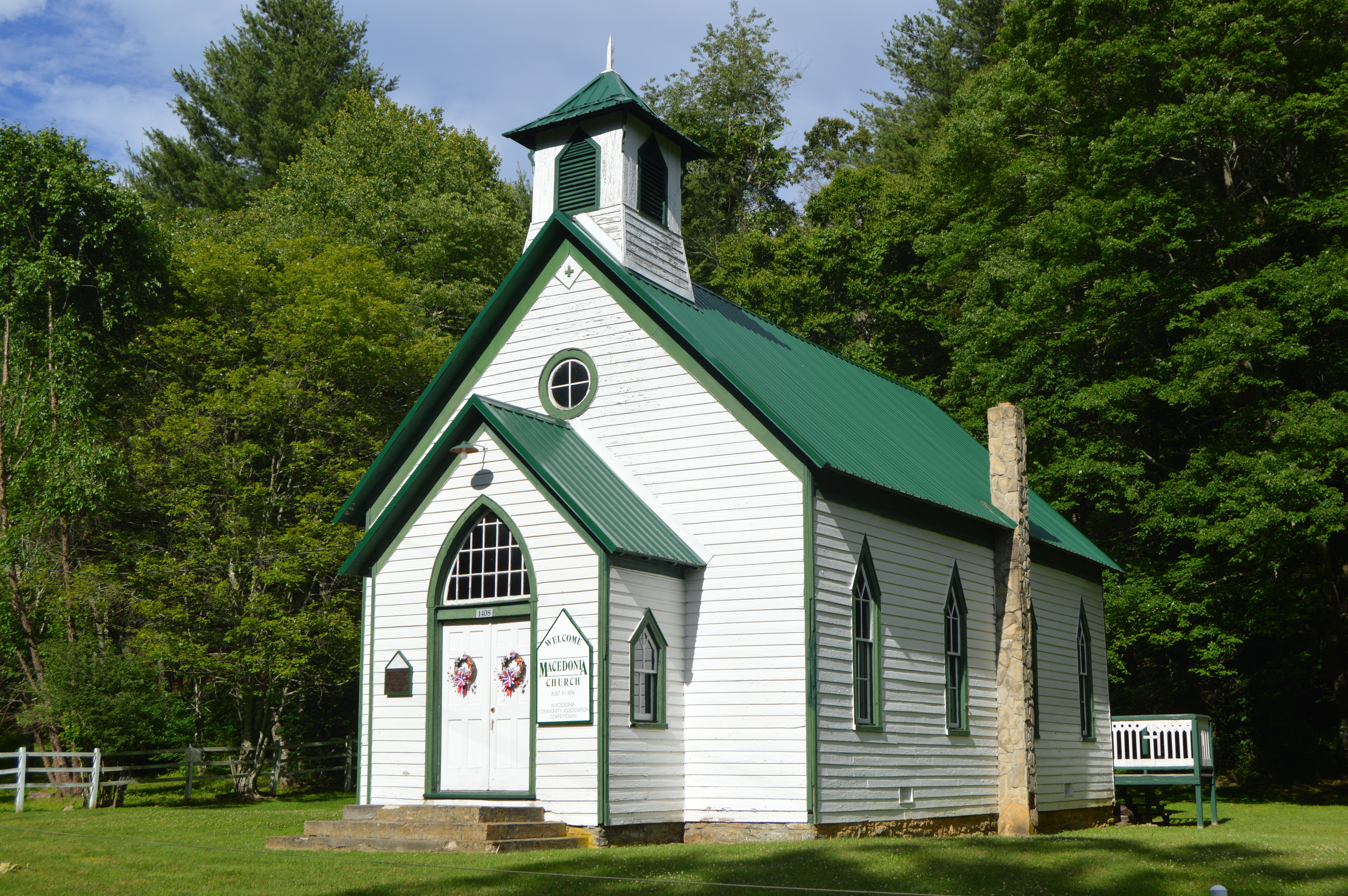
- Front and southwestern side

- Location within Virginia Location within the United States
- Location: 1408 Coffeytown Rd., near Vesuvius, Virginia
- Coordinates: 37°45′42″N 79°13′55″W
- Area: 2 acres (0.81 ha)
- Built: 1896
- Built by: F. E. Coleman
- Architectural style: Gothic Revival
- NRHP reference No.: 12000017
- VLR No.: 005-5159

Significant dates
- Added to NRHP: February 8, 2012
- Designated VLR: December 15, 2011

Macedonia Methodist Church is a historic Methodist church located at Coffeytown, near Vesuvius, Amherst County, Virginia. It was built in 1896, and is a one-story, frame church building with vernacular Gothic Revival style influences. It sits on a random rubble stone foundation and has a gable roof with front bell tower. The interior features original unpainted American chestnut beaded board paneling on the walls and ceiling.

It was added to the National Register of Historic Places in 2011.
