= Red Hill Farm (Pedlar Mills, Virginia) =

Historic house in Virginia, United States

- U.S. National Register of Historic Places
- Virginia Landmarks Register
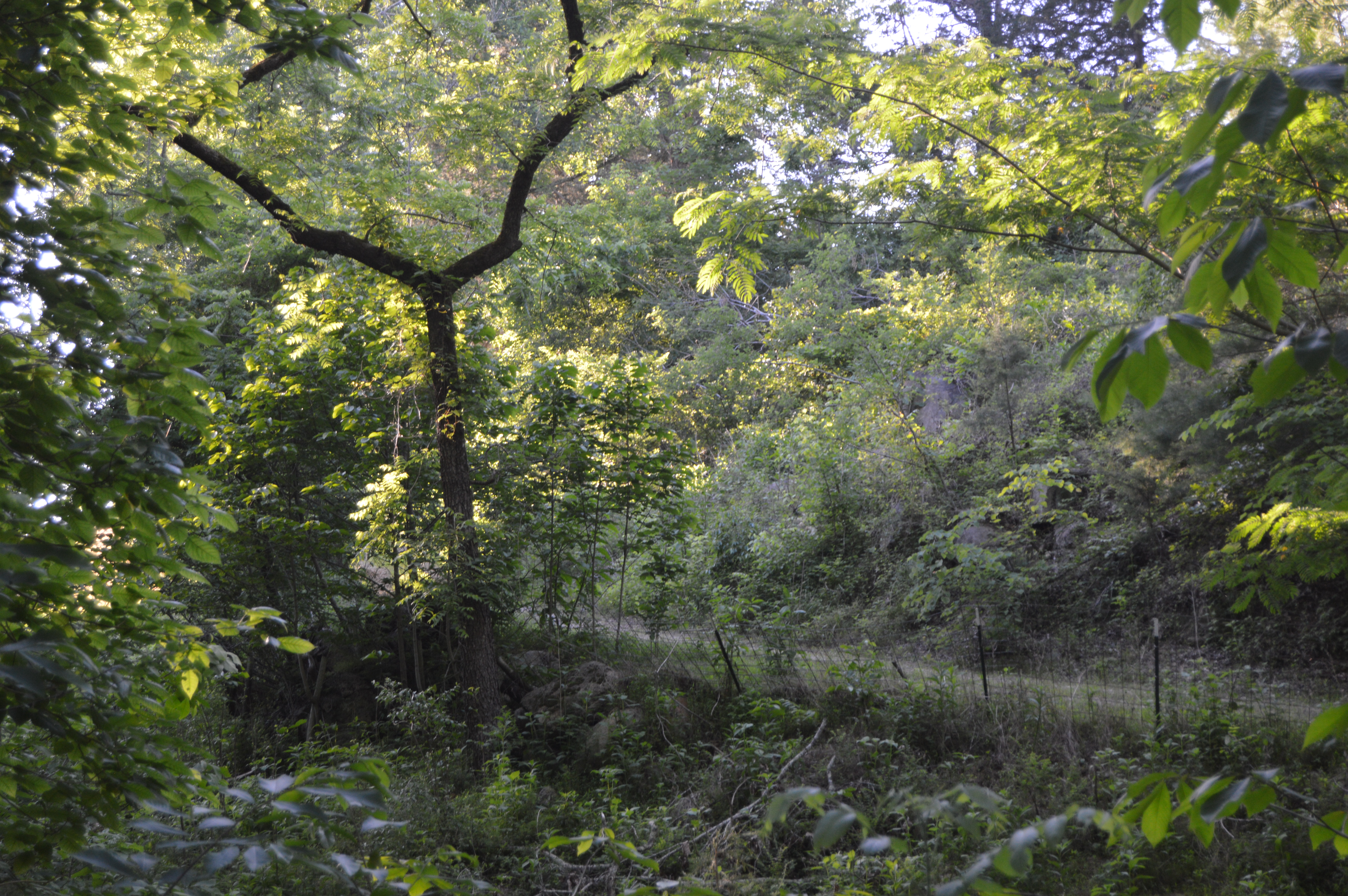
- Driveway

- Location within Virginia Location within the United States
- Location: West of Pedlar Mills on Minors Branch Road, near Pedlar Mills, Virginia
- Coordinates: 37°33′30″N 79°15′59″W
- Area: 138 acres (56 ha)
- Built: 1824-1825
- Architectural style: Federal
- NRHP reference No.: 80004168
- VLR No.: 005-0014

Significant dates
- Added to NRHP: June 9, 1980
- Designated VLR: March 18, 1980

Red Hill Farm is a historic home located near Pedlar Mills, Amherst County, Virginia. The main house was built about 1824–1825, and is a 2 1/2-story, Federal style brick dwelling. It has a double-pile, central-hall plan. It measures 55 feet by 42 feet, and has a slate covered hipped roof. Also on the property are a contributing brick kitchen building and "Round Top," the former overseer's residence dating to the late-18th century.

It was added to the National Register of Historic Places in 1980.
