= Dulwich Manor =

Historic house in Virginia, United States

- The Dulwich Manor
- U.S. National Register of Historic Places
- Virginia Landmarks Register
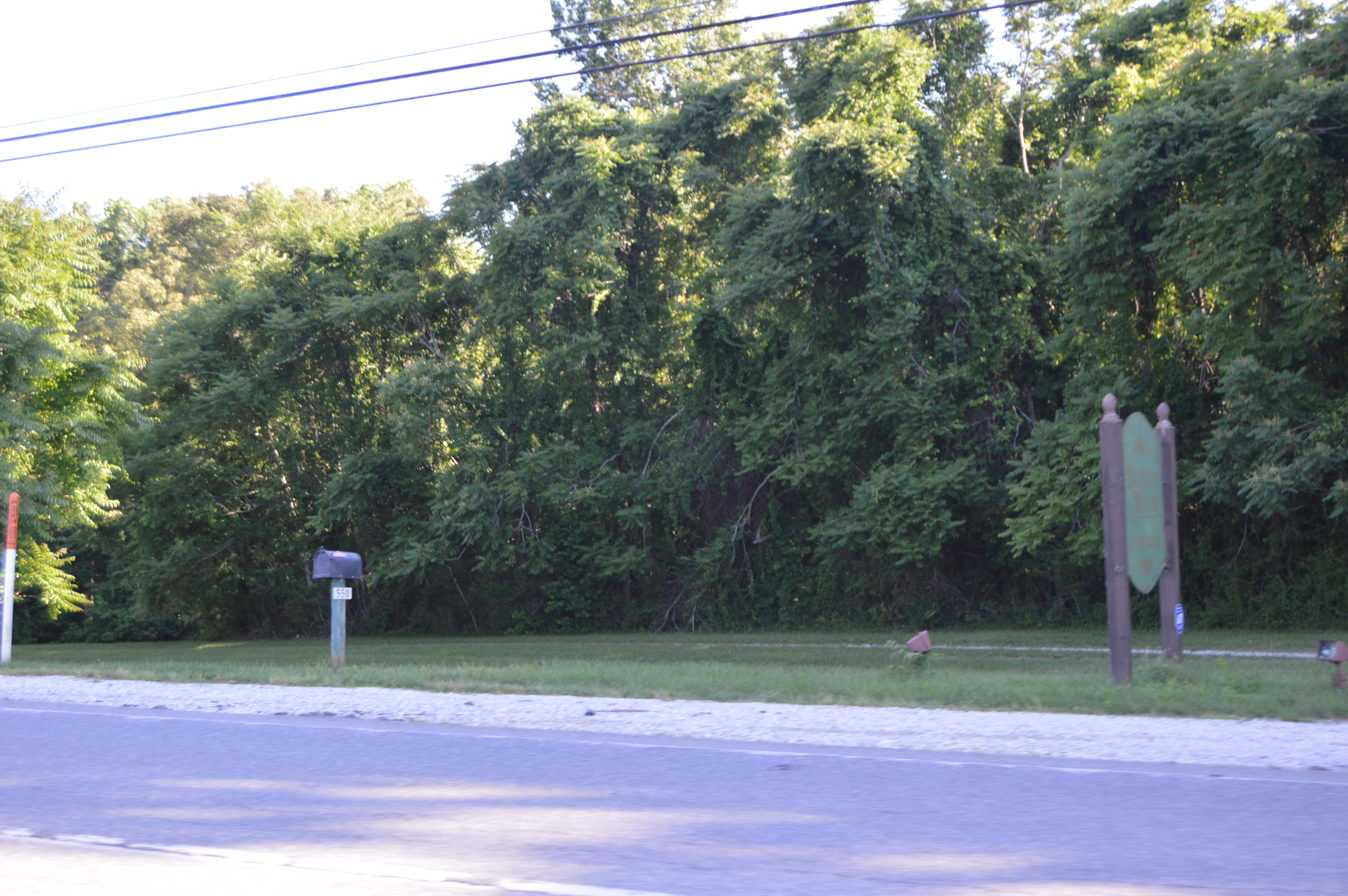
- Entrance

- Location within Virginia Location within the United States
- Location: 550 U.S. Route 60 in Amherst, Virginia
- Coordinates: 37°34′26″N 79°02′30″W
- Area: 15 acres (6.1 ha)
- Built: 1909
- Built by: Leslie C. Gregory
- Architectural style: Neo-Classical Revival
- NRHP reference No.: 13000335
- VLR No.: 163-5020

Significant dates
- Added to NRHP: May 28, 2013
- Designated VLR: March 21, 2013

The Dulwich Manor, also known as Dulwich Farm, Dulwich House, and Amherst Academy, is a historic home located near Amherst, Amherst County, Virginia. It was built in 1909, and is a 2 1/2-story, five-bay, Classical Revival style brick dwelling. The façade is dominated by a large, two-story portico capped by a pediment formed by a cross gable roof with a small tripartite Palladian window in the tympanum. The house is covered by a steeply pitched hipped roof of slate shingles. Also on the property is a contributing shed and gateposts.

It was listed on the National Register of Historic Places in 2013.
