= Madison Heights, Virginia =

Madison Heights
- Census-designated place
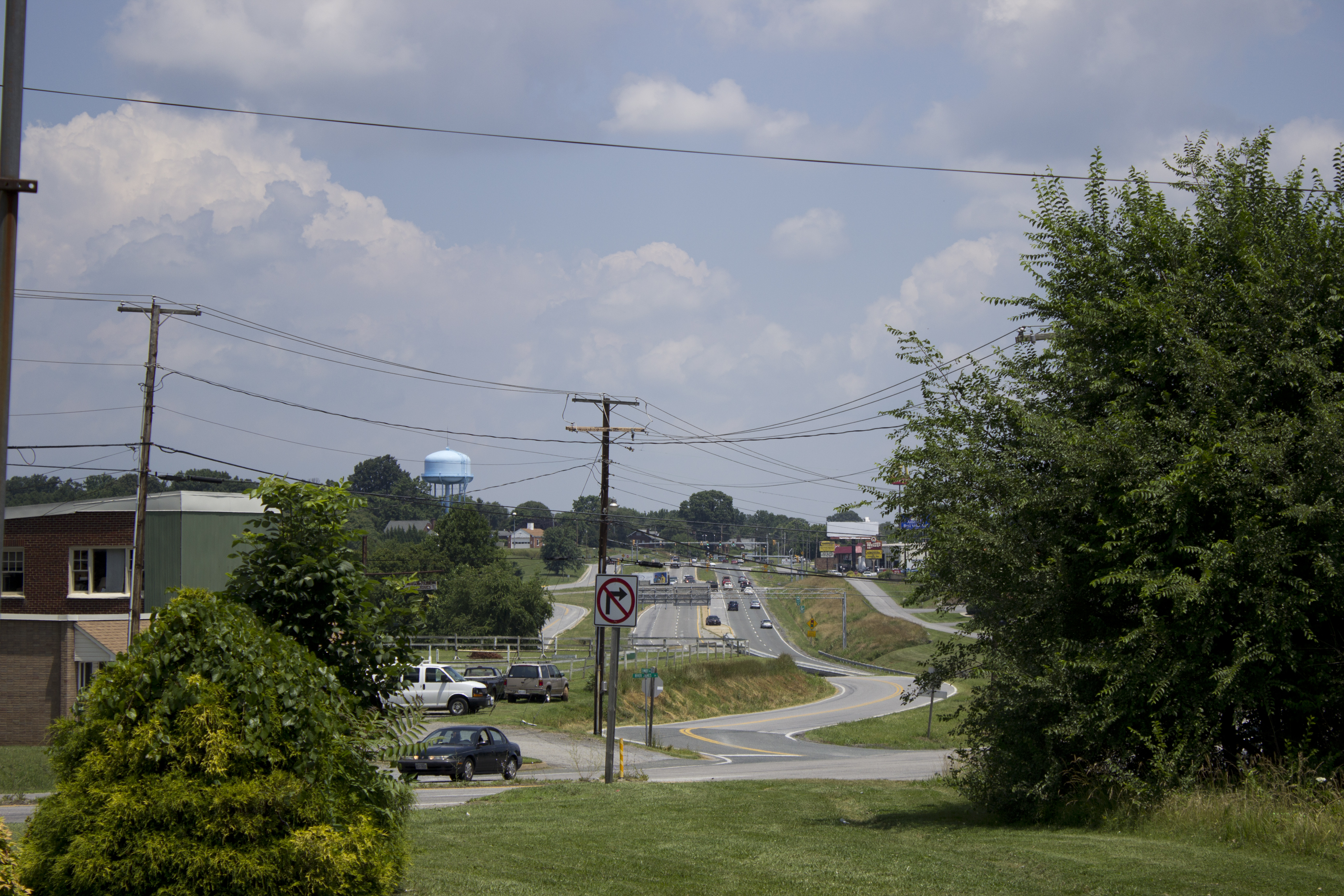
- Looking towards U.S. 29 in Madison Heights

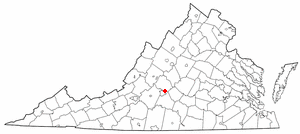
- Location of Madison Heights, Virginia
- Coordinates: 37°26′22″N 79°7′2″W
- Country: United States
- State: Virginia
- County: Amherst

Area
  - Total: 19.5 sq mi (50.6 km^{2})
  - Land: 19.2 sq mi (49.7 km^{2})
  - Water: 0.31 sq mi (0.8 km^{2})
- Elevation: 750 ft (230 m)

Population (2010)
  - Total: 11,285
  - Density: 588/sq mi (227/km^{2})
- Time zone: UTC−5 (Eastern (EST))
  - Summer (DST): UTC−4 (EDT)
- ZIP code: 24572
- Area code: 434
- FIPS code: 51-48520
- GNIS feature ID: 1495886

Madison Heights is a census-designated place (CDP) in Amherst County, Virginia, United States. The population was 10,893 at the 2020 census. It is part of the Lynchburg Metropolitan Statistical Area.

== History ==
Fort Riverview (44AH91 and 44AH195), Galt's Mill Complex, Oak Lawn, and Hanshill are listed on the National Register of Historic Places.

Mt. Sinai Baptist Church is a historically Black church in Madison Heights. In 1974, the pastor was Rev. Roger Ford.

== Geography ==
Madison Heights is located at 37°26′22″N 79°7′2″W (37.439406, −79.117259).

According to the United States Census Bureau, the CDP has a total area of 19.5 square miles (50.6 km^{2}), of which 19.2 square miles (49.7 km^{2}) is land and 0.31 square miles (0.8 km^{2}), or 1.67%, is water.

== Demographics ==
Historical population
Census	Pop.	Note	%±
1950	2,830		—
1980	14,146		—
1990	11,700		−17.3%
2000	11,584		−1.0%
2010	11,285		−2.6%
2020	10,893		−3.5%
U.S. Decennial Census; 1950 1960 1970; 1980 1990 2000; 2010

Madison Heights was first listed as an unincorporated community in the 1950 U.S. census. The community did not appear in the 1960 U.S. census or the 1970 U.S. census until its listing as a census designated place in the 1980 U.S. census.

=== Racial and ethnic composition ===
Madison Heights CDP, Virginia – Racial and ethnic composition Note: the US Census treats Hispanic/Latino as an ethnic category. This table excludes Latinos from the racial categories and assigns them to a separate category. Hispanics/Latinos may be of any race.
Race / Ethnicity (NH = Non-Hispanic)	Pop 2000	Pop 2010	Pop 2020	% 2000	% 2010	% 2020
White alone (NH)	8,981	8,225	7,340	77.53%	72.88%	67.38%
Black or African American alone (NH)	2,252	2,437	2,450	19.44%	21.60%	22.49%
Native American or Alaska Native alone (NH)	71	99	87	0.61%	0.88%	0.80%
Asian alone (NH)	47	78	82	0.41%	0.69%	0.75%
Native Hawaiian or Pacific Islander alone (NH)	0	5	10	0.00%	0.04%	0.09%
Other race alone (NH)	35	19	39	0.30%	0.17%	0.36%
Mixed race or Multiracial (NH)	95	246	624	0.82%	2.18%	5.73%
Hispanic or Latino (any race)	103	176	261	0.89%	1.56%	2.40%
Total	11,584	11,285	10,893	100.00%	100.00%	100.00%

=== 2020 census ===
As of the 2020 census, Madison Heights had a population of 10,893. The median age was 42.9 years. 21.0% of residents were under the age of 18 and 20.5% of residents were 65 years of age or older. For every 100 females there were 91.6 males, and for every 100 females age 18 and over there were 86.9 males age 18 and over.

91.9% of residents lived in urban areas, while 8.1% lived in rural areas.

There were 4,591 households in Madison Heights, of which 26.8% had children under the age of 18 living in them. Of all households, 42.0% were married-couple households, 18.4% were households with a male householder and no spouse or partner present, and 32.4% were households with a female householder and no spouse or partner present. About 30.6% of all households were made up of individuals and 14.2% had someone living alone who was 65 years of age or older.

There were 4,968 housing units, of which 7.6% were vacant. The homeowner vacancy rate was 2.1% and the rental vacancy rate was 6.3%.

Racial composition as of the 2020 census
Race	Number	Percent
White	7,404	68.0%
Black or African American	2,465	22.6%
American Indian and Alaska Native	88	0.8%
Asian	82	0.8%
Native Hawaiian and Other Pacific Islander	11	0.1%
Some other race	138	1.3%
Two or more races	705	6.5%

=== 2000 census ===
As of the census of 2000, there were 11,584 people, 4,451 households, and 3,182 families residing in the CDP. The population density was 600.7 people per square mile (232.0/km^{2}). There were 4,656 housing units at an average density of 241.5/sq mi (93.2/km^{2}). The racial makeup of the CDP was 77.80% White, 19.57% African American, 0.66% Native American, 0.45% Asian, 0.58% from other races, and 0.94% from two or more races. Hispanic or Latino of any race were 0.89% of the population.

There were 4,451 households, out of which 30.1% had children under the age of 18 living with them, 53.2% were married couples living together, 14.1% had a female householder with no husband present, and 28.5% were non-families. 24.3% of all households were made up of individuals, and 10.0% had someone living alone who was 65 years of age or older. The average household size was 2.45 and the average family size was 2.88.

In the CDP, the population was spread out, with 21.9% under the age of 18, 7.6% from 18 to 24, 29.1% from 25 to 44, 26.1% from 45 to 64, and 15.2% who were 65 years of age or older. The median age was 40 years. For every 100 females, there were 91.9 males. For every 100 females age 18 and over, there were 90.2 males.

The median income for a household in the CDP was $32,359, and the median income for a family was $39,415. Males had a median income of $30,340 versus $22,009 for females. The per capita income for the CDP was $15,589. About 7.2% of families and 9.2% of the population were below the poverty line, including 10.6% of those under age 18 and 9.5% of those age 65 or over.

== Education ==
Madison Heights is served by Amherst County Public Schools, with Monelison Middle School, Amelon Elementary School, and Madison Heights Elementary School located in Madison Heights. Temple Christian School is a private school located on the grounds of Temple Baptist Church.

== Central Virginia Training Center ==
The Central Virginia Training Center was a state education facility in Madison Heights. Previously it was known as the Virginia State Colony for Epileptics and Feebleminded where forced sterilizations were conducted, 8,300 from 1924 to 1972 on those determined to be "unfit".

Carrie Buck, the plaintiff in the United States Supreme Court case Buck v. Bell, was sterilized after being classified as "feeble-minded", as part of the state's eugenics program while she was a patient at the Colony. The story of Carrie Buck's sterilization and the court case was made into a television drama in 1994, Against Her Will: The Carrie Buck Story. "Virginia State Epileptic Colony," a song by the Manic Street Preachers on their 2009 album Journal for Plague Lovers, addresses the state's program of eugenics.

The facility was permanently closed in 2020 after an investigation by the United States Department of Justice Civil Rights Division found multiple violations of the Americans with Disabilities Act of 1990. As of 2025, the site sits abandoned but is planned for redevelopment into an urban center for Madison Heights.

== Notable people ==
- Clay Bryant, baseball player, manager, and coach.
- Randy Tomlin, former pitcher for the Pittsburgh Pirates.
