= Amherst, Virginia =

Amherst
- Town
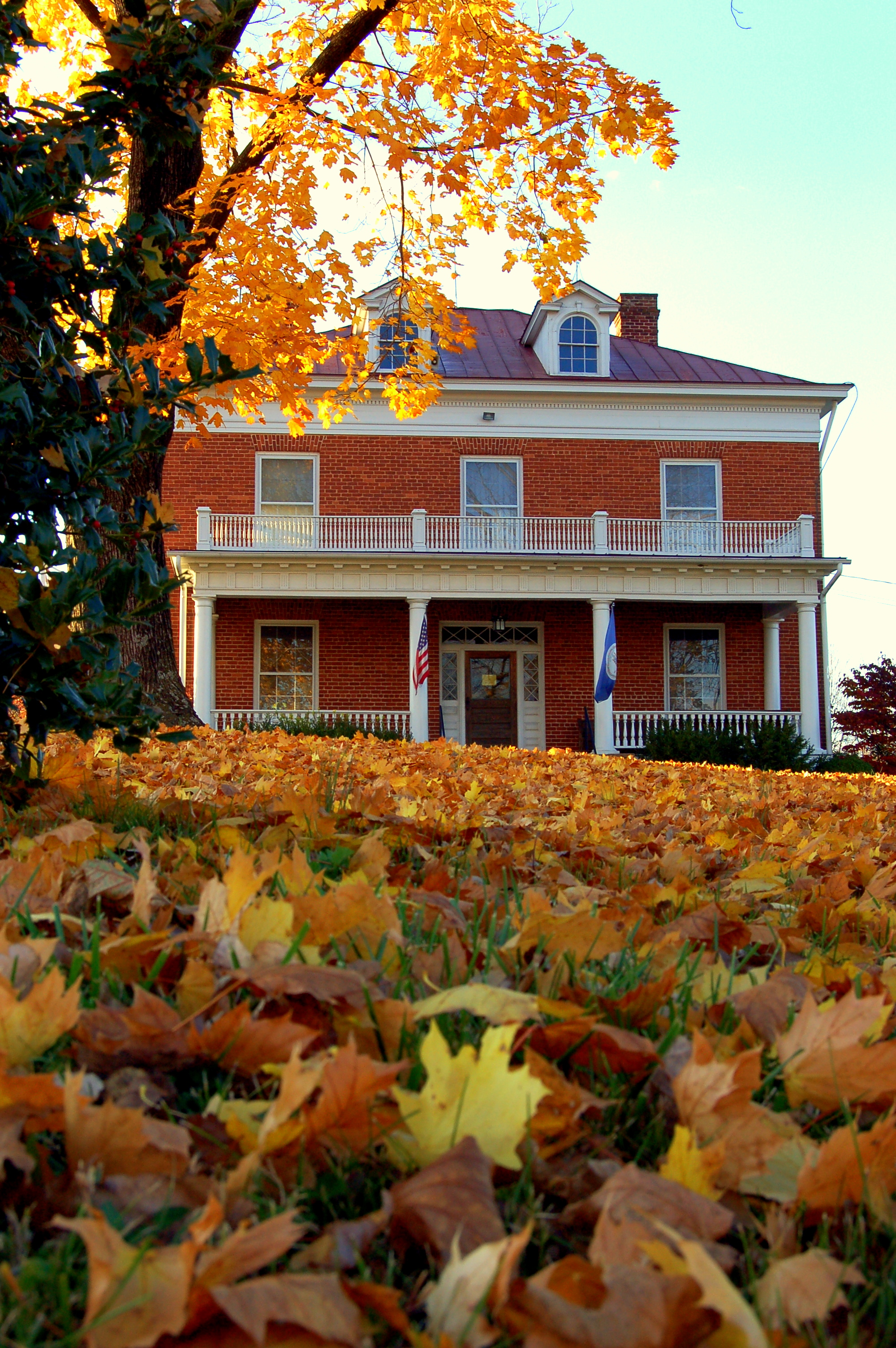
- Amherst Historical Society building

- Seal

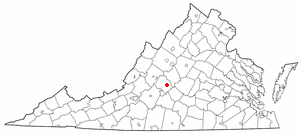
- Location of Amherst, Virginia

- Location within Virginia Location within the United States Location within North America
- Coordinates: 37°34′37″N 79°3′2″W
- Country: United States
- State: Virginia
- County: Amherst

Area
  - Total: 4.92 sq mi (12.75 km^{2})
  - Land: 4.90 sq mi (12.70 km^{2})
  - Water: 0.019 sq mi (0.05 km^{2})
- Elevation: 761 ft (232 m)

Population (2020)
  - Total: 2,110
  - Estimate (2019): 2,180
  - Density: 445/sq mi (171.7/km^{2})
- Time zone: UTC−5 (Eastern (EST))
  - Summer (DST): UTC−4 (EDT)
- ZIP code: 24521
- Area code: 434
- FIPS code: 51-01672
- GNIS feature ID: 1498447
- Website: Official website

Amherst (formerly Dearborn) is a town in Amherst County, Virginia, United States. As of the 2020 census, Amherst had a population of 2,110. It is the county seat of Amherst County.

Amherst is part of the Lynchburg metropolitan area.

== History ==
Amherst was founded in 1807. Originally known as "The Oaks" and "Seven Oaks", it began as a stagecoach station on the Charlottesville to Lynchburg road. Once Nelson County was separated from Amherst County in 1807, the community became the seat of Amherst County. It was at this time that the village decided to rename itself in honor of French and Indian War hero Jeffery Amherst, 1st Baron Amherst. Major-General Amherst had been the hero of the Battle of Ticonderoga and later served as the governor of the Colony of Virginia from 1763 to 1768.

In 1847, local planter William Waller, aged 58, walked from Amherst to Louisiana with about 20 slaves for sale. His letters home during the trip, held by the Virginia Historical Society, provide rare documentation of a slave coffle.

On April 15, 1910, Amherst was incorporated by the order of the Circuit Court. A charter was granted to the town by the General Assembly in 1950.

The official town seal was created by Ward Cruea, a commercial artist from Dayton, Ohio. His original proposal featured the "sleeping giant" (the Blue Ridge Mountain ridgeline west of Amherst), but this was rejected as it represented an area outside the town's limits. According to town legend, while a group was in the Clerk's office in the town hall engaged in conversation on the topics of the day, and looking eastward along East Court Street, it was suggested that the Amherst courthouse be used as a model for the official seal. During that era, a large letter "A" was attached to a radio antenna tower beside the telephone company building adjacent to the courthouse. This internally illuminated "A" was used as a visual navigation beacon by aircraft pilots. Approximately six months later Cruea returned to the town and delivered a framed original of a proposed seal. It incorporated the courthouse, the "A," and the town's date of incorporation. Cruea's proposal was adopted soon thereafter and became Amherst's official seal. The original seal is located on the wall of the town council chambers.

One of the main landmarks of the town is the roundabout located at the intersection of Main Street and U.S. Route 60. "The Circle," as it is affectionately referred to by Amherst residents, is the oldest traffic circle in the Virginia Department of Transportation system. The Village Garden Club installed and maintains the fountain and the landscaping at the circle.

Another Amherst landmark is the Amherst County courthouse. An original courthouse was built in 1809 but was torn down in 1872, and the current building was built shortly thereafter. All Amherst County records have been stored there since 1761 when Amherst‑Nelson counties were divided from Albemarle County.

The Thompson's Mill-Amherst Mill Complex was previously home to Amherst Milling Co. The main building is an “evolved” structure with elements dating from at least the late 19th- century. It was active in the production of cornmeal and flour before closing in 2017. In 2018, the Virginia Department of Historic Resources placed the building on its Virginia Landmarks Register.

Other important sites located in or near the town include the Bear Mountain Indian Mission School, Edgewood, 1818, Edgewood, 1858, Fairview, Forest Hill, The Glebe, Dulwich Manor, and Tusculum. These places are all listed on the National Register of Historic Places.

== Geography ==
Amherst is located at 37°34′37″N 79°3′2″W (37.576899, −79.050424). According to the United States Census Bureau, the town has a total area of 5.0 square miles (12.9 km^{2}), all land.

The town lies 25 miles southeast of Lexington, 44 miles southwest from Charlottesville, 20 miles northwest of Appomattox, and only 13 miles north of Lynchburg.

== Demographics ==
Historical population
Census	Pop.	Note	%±
1890	590		—
1910	618		—
1920	559		−9.5%
1930	876		56.7%
1940	930		6.2%
1950	1,038		11.6%
1960	1,200		15.6%
1970	1,108		−7.7%
1980	1,135		2.4%
1990	1,060		−6.6%
2000	2,251		112.4%
2010	2,231		−0.9%
2020	2,110		−5.4%
U.S. Decennial Census

As of the 2000 census, there were 2,251 people, 940 households, and 568 families residing in the town. The population density was 451.3 people per square mile (174.2/km^{2}). There were 1,000 housing units at an average density of 200.5 per square mile (77.4/km^{2}). The racial makeup of the town was 68.95% White, 29.63% African American, 0.31% Native American, 0.31% Asian, 0.04% from other races, and 0.76% from two or more races. Hispanic or Latino of any race were 1.02% of the population.

There were 940 households, out of which 28.2% had children under the age of 18 living with them, 43.4% were married couples living together, 14.6% had a female householder with no husband present, and 39.5% were non-families. 37.0% of all households were made up of individuals, and 19.7% had someone living alone who was 65 years of age or older. The average household size was 2.18 and the average family size was 2.84.

In the town, the population was spread out, with 21.6% under the age of 18, 6.1% from 18 to 24, 24.4% from 25 to 44, 23.5% from 45 to 64, and 24.3% who were 65 years of age or older. The median age was 43 years. For every 100 females, there were 84.7 males. For every 100 females age 18 and over, there were 77.3 males.

The median income for a household in the town was $33,000, and the median income for a family was $44,181. Males had a median income of $35,714 versus $20,321 for females. The per capita income for the town was $18,457. About 13.3% of families and 18.0% of the population were below the poverty line, including 25.1% of those under age 18 and 26.5% of those age 65 or over.

== Education ==
Amherst has many public schools which provide primary and secondary education to local children. There are also opportunities for higher learning.

Amherst County School System operates the public education system in the town. The public schools in the area are:

- Amherst Elementary School (K-5)
- Central Elementary School (K-5)
- Amherst Middle School (grades 6-8)
- Amherst County High School (grades 9-12)
- Monelison Middle School (grades 6-8)
- Madison Heights Elementary School (K-5)
- Elon Elementary School (K-5)
- Temperance Elementary School (K-5)

In addition, Amherst is served by the women's liberal arts college Sweet Briar College.

Central Virginia Community College has a small center in Amherst that serves the community in higher education.

== Local economics ==
Amherst has several places of business and commerce that provide products and jobs for the community. Major employers in and near the town include the Ambriar and Mountainview Shopping Centers, Clorox, HVAC machinery manufacturer Buffalo Air, Sweet Briar College, clock manufacturer Hermle, and Greif paper mill.

== Town services ==
Amherst provides services for the town (and in some cases outside the corporate limits) including:

- Water services
- Sewer services
- Refuse collection
- Street lights (on a request-by-request basis)

== Transportation ==
There is no public transportation in Amherst. All forms of transportation and transportation services are privately owned.

Air service

Lynchburg Regional Airport is located along U.S. 29 approximately 20 miles south of Amherst. Falwell Aviation, Inc., a general utility airport is located on U.S. 29 in the City of Lynchburg. Both airports are used by small aircraft for business and pleasure flying. Commercial passenger service is available at Lynchburg Regional, and Falwell Aviation has facilities for the landing of small private jet aircraft. Air freight service is available from Lynchburg Regional. Other air services are available nearby in Charlottesville, Roanoke, Richmond and Washington, D.C., and Durham, North Carolina.

Rail service

Norfolk Southern's north-south mainline between Washington, D.C., and Birmingham, Alabama, passes through Amherst. This line serves Glad Manufacturing.

Passenger service to Amherst was discontinued some years ago, but the Amtrak Crescent, using the NS mainline, passes through the town on its daily trip between Washington, D.C., and New Orleans and may be boarded at Lynchburg and Charlottesville.

Bus service

Greyhound Bus Company has flag stop passenger service in Amherst, stopping for passengers as necessary while traveling U.S. Route 29.

Trucking service

Amherst is served by several interstate and intrastate motor freight companies located throughout Central Virginia. These freight companies provide extensive coverage throughout the eastern United States and many areas of the Midwest and Canada.

Carrier service is provided by United Parcel Service, Purolator, Emery, Courier Express and Federal Express.

== Major highways and roads ==
There are two major highways in Amherst: U.S. Route 29 and U.S. Route 60.

U.S. Route 29

A multi‑lane highway passing from Baltimore, Maryland, through Amherst and southward to Pensacola, Florida. About 15 miles south of town, Route 29 intersects with U.S. Route 460, a major east-west highway, Interstate 64 which intersects with U.S. Route 29 about 45 miles north of the town.

There are two routes relating to U.S. Route 29 running through Amherst which are U.S. 29 and U.S. 29 Business. U.S. 29 Business was the former route of U.S. 29 but a bypass around the downtown area was constructed which made the former routing obsolete.

U.S. Route 60

A two-lane highway through Amherst, is an east-west highway stretching from the Atlantic Ocean at Virginia Beach to the Pacific Ocean at Los Angeles. Route 60 provides both a direct route of travel from Amherst to the state capitol in Richmond and is the area's link with Interstate 81, a north‑south interstate that passes through the Shenandoah Valley.

== Healthcare ==
Amherst does not have an emergency room (those in need of emergency health service utilize Centra's Lynchburg General Hospital), but Amherst does have several healthcare offices and organizations including

- Amherst Rescue Squad (Emergency Medical Service)
- Fairmont Crossing (Nursing Home, Health Rehabilitation)
- Amherst UVA Dialysis Facility
- Harman Eye Center
- Central Virginia Family Dentistry
- Amherst Family Dental Care

In 2014, Centra announced that it plans to open a new ambulatory care facility in Amherst.

== Tourism ==
Amherst has many different attractive outdoor spots that are very tourist-friendly. These attractions provide beautiful natural entertainment and are good places for fishing, hiking, picnics, and other outdoor pleasures. These locations include:

- Mount Pleasant National Scenic Area
- Blue Ridge Parkway
- Panther Falls
- Station Creek Falls
- Long Mountain Wayside/Appalachian Trail
- Thrashers Lake Park
- Stonehouse Lake Park
- Mill Creek Lake Park
- Virginia Blue Ridge Railway Trail
- Sweet Briar College Trails
- Coolwell Park
- James River Heritage Trail
- Riverridge Park
- Monacan Park
- ATV Trails
- James River Foot Bridge/Appalachian Trail

== Notable people ==
- Black Herman, African American stage magician during the Jim Crow laws era
- David B. Mintz, Methodist circuit rider minister for Amherst in 1802
