= Lowesville, Virginia =

Unincorporated community in Virginia, US

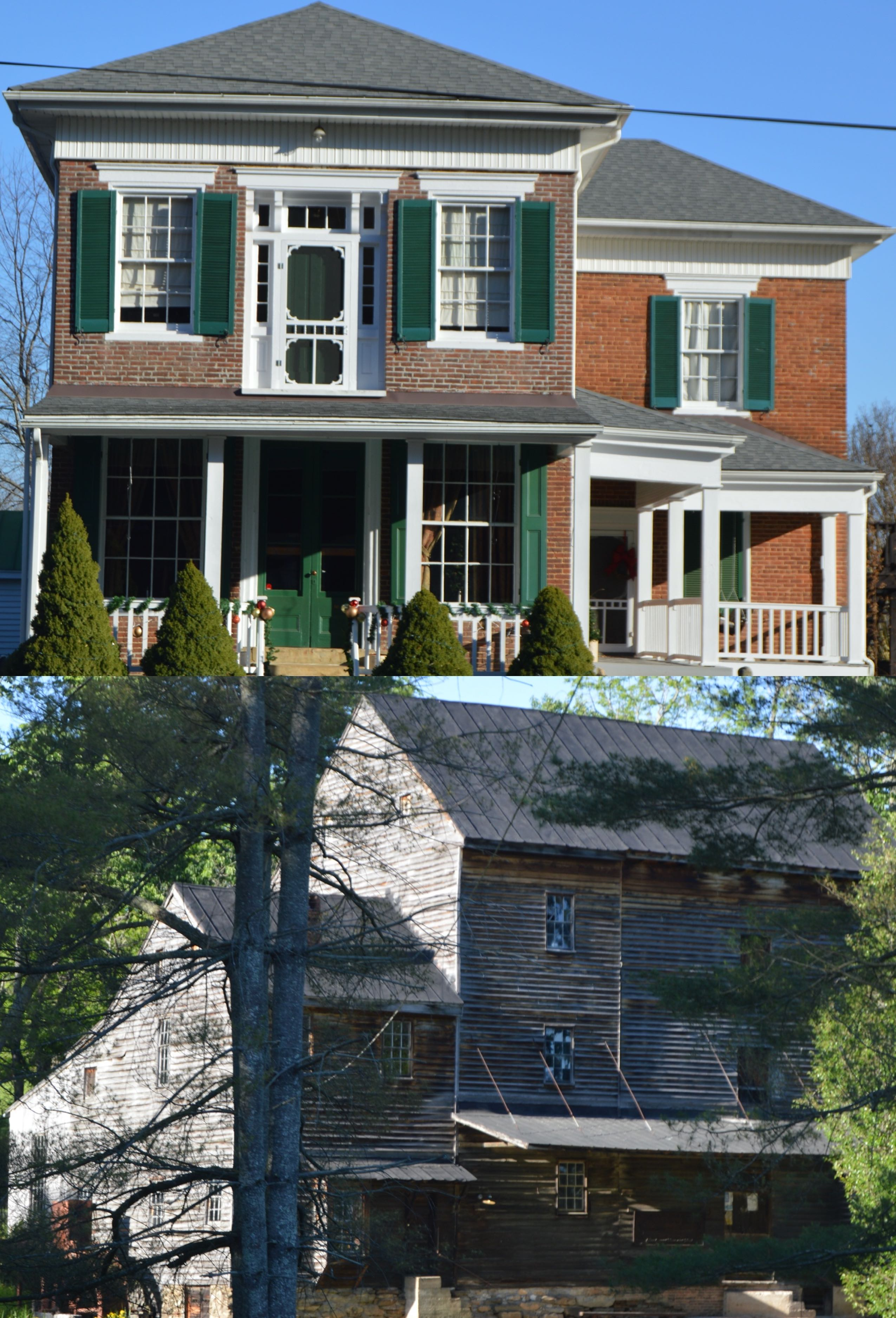
- A collage of Hite Store (above) and Woodson's Mill (below) in Lowesville.

- Location in Virginia Location in the United States
- Coordinates: 37°43′09″N 79°03′53″W

Lowesville is an unincorporated community in Nelson County, Virginia, United States. It lies along the path of the now-defunct Virginia Blue Ridge Railway.

Hite Store was added to the National Register of Historic Places in 1997.
