= Tusculum (Amherst, Virginia) =

Historic house in Virginia, United States

- U.S. National Register of Historic Places
- Virginia Landmarks Register
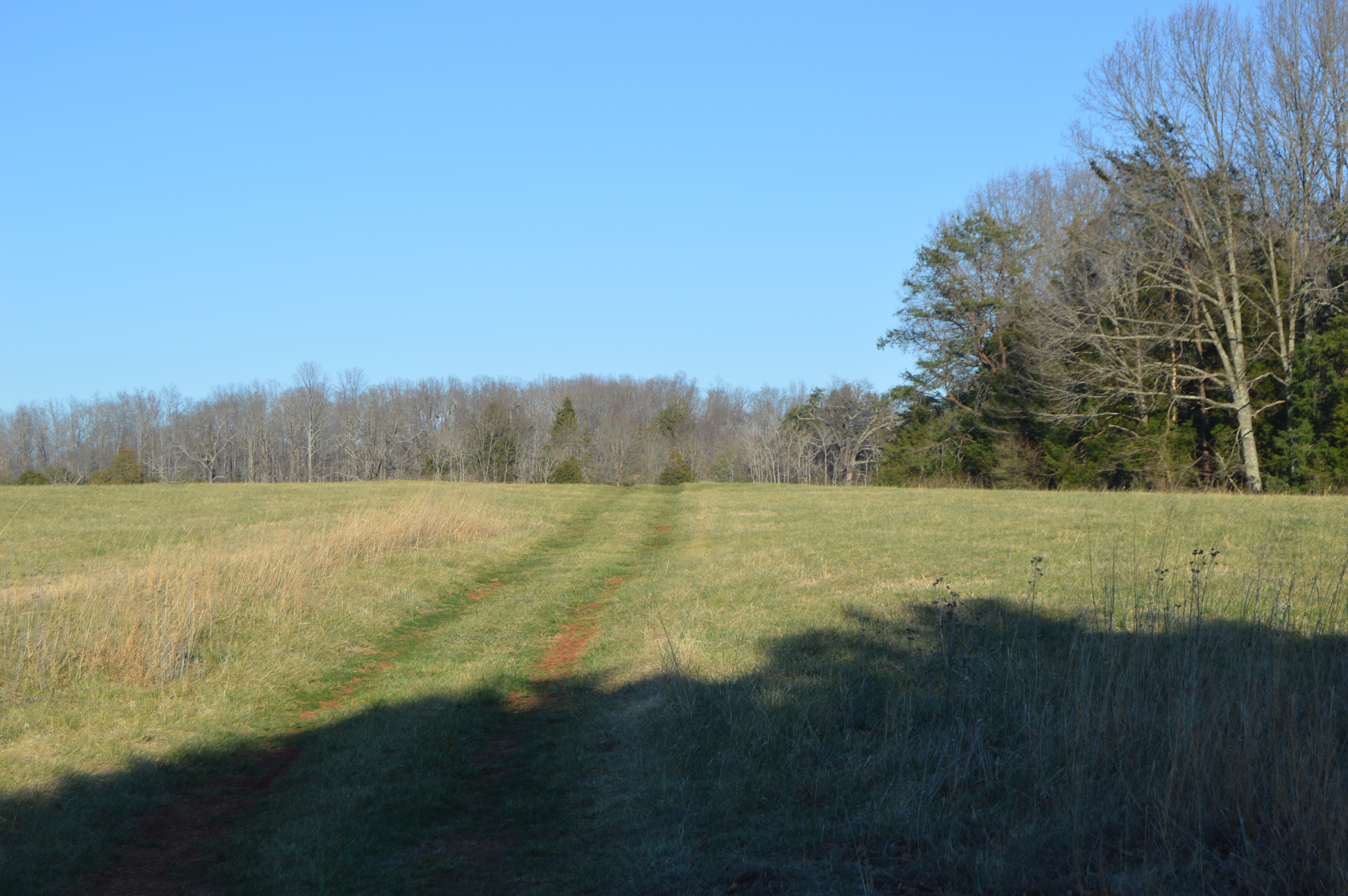
- Site of the farmstead

- Location within Virginia Location within the United States
- Location: 2077 N. Amherst Hwy. (US 29), near Amherst, Virginia
- Coordinates: 37°38′10″N 78°59′51″W
- Area: Less than 1 acre (0.40 ha)
- Architectural style: Georgian, Federal
- NRHP reference No.: 04001244
- VLR No.: 005-0020

Significant dates
- Added to NRHP: November 19, 2004
- Designated VLR: September 8, 2004

Tusculum was a historic home located near Amherst in Amherst County, Virginia, United States. It was a two-story Georgian and Federal style frame house built in two principal phases. The north section was built possibly as early as the 1750s, with the south section added about 1805. It sat on a brick and stone foundation and was covered in beaded weatherboard siding. The house was acquired by the Association for the Preservation of Virginia Antiquities in 2003. It was added to the National Register of Historic Places in 2004. The house has been described as "one of the oldest and most architecturally significant dwellings in the Virginia Piedmont", and is said by one source to have been the birthplace of Senator William H. Crawford.

Tusculum was once owned by Elijah Fletcher, whose daughter, Indiana Fletcher Williams, was the founder of Sweet Briar College; it was the childhood home of her mother, Maria Crawford. The college collaborated with the Association for the Preservation of Virginia Antiquities to purchase the house for preservation, and in 2006 it was carefully dismantled, and removed to a dairy barn on the college campus. Plans were announced, in 2008, to re-erect the house on land behind Sweet Briar House and turn it into a center for community history and outreach. However, the cost of renovation proved to be too great, and in 2013 it was decided to offer the home for sale, with stipulations as to the manner in which it could be restored. In 2014 the home was purchased by a local couple who announced plans to rebuild it at Forks of Buffalo, around eight miles from its original location in the vicinity of Clifford.

The Tusculum Institute at Sweet Briar College, dedicated to the discussion and preservation of local history and the support and teaching of historic preservation, takes its name from the house.
