= Elijah Fletcher =

American planter and journalist (1789–1858)

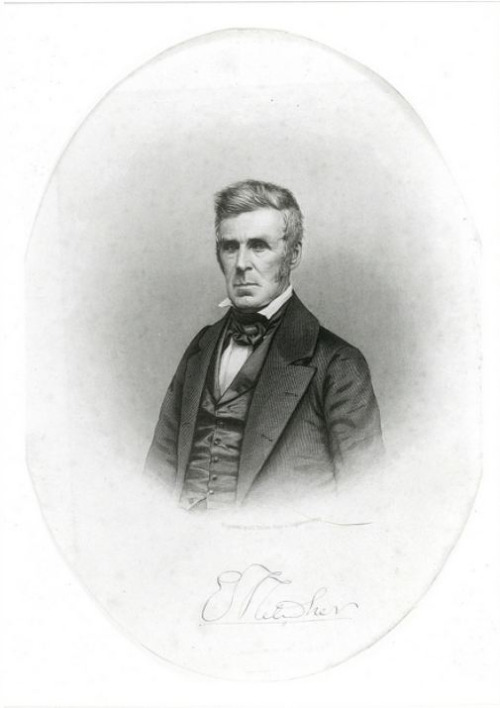
- Born: July 28, 1789; Ludlow, Vermont, US
- Died: February 13, 1858 (aged 68); Sweet Briar plantation, Virginia, US
- Occupations: teacher, plantation owner, mayor and city councilman
- Spouse: Maria Antoinette Crawford
- Children: 4, including Indiana

Elijah Fletcher (July 28, 1789 – February 13, 1858) was an American plantation owner, teacher, and businessman, who also served as mayor of Lynchburg, Virginia for two terms in the early 1830s, as well as on the city council.

== Early and family life ==
Fletcher was born in Ludlow, Vermont, to farmer, revolutionary war veteran, town clerk, and justice of the peace Jesse Fletcher (1762–1832) and his wife, the former Lucy Keyes (1765–1846). The family included ten sons and five daughters (of these, Steven, 1784–1790; Charlotte, died in 1795; and Dexter, 1801–1803, died as children). Sons Michael Fletcher (1785–1859), Calvin Fletcher (1798–1866), and Stoughton Alonzo Fletcher (1803–1882) all eventually moved to Indiana to seek their fortunes, which became intertwined with those of their middle brother, Elijah. Daughter Lucy Fletcher William married a doctor and moved to Newark, New York, whither her sisters Louisa Fletcher Miller (1804–1836) and Laura Fletcher Button (d. 1845) also moved. Timothy Fletcher (1791–1870) worked with Elijah in Virginia before returning home to Vermont, as did his brother Stoughton (whose son Allen Miller Fletcher later became governor of Vermont), for vacations.

After his father suffered financial embarrassment, Elijah Fletcher accepted a teaching position in Raleigh, North Carolina. The job would pay $600, but required him to begin in the fall. Middlebury College, where he had studied for three years, refused to confer a degree upon him before the winter, so he transferred to the University of Vermont at Burlington, which was willing to confer the necessary degree by July.

By July 6, Elijah had started southward with a horse and borrowed $20, economizing by stopping at farmhouses for soured milk and eating only dinner (usually only bread and cheese, but five times a meal on the 15 day journey from Albany, New York). He arrived in Washington, D.C., with $8. There, he met another young schoolmaster, who knew people in North Carolina but had accepted a job at Alexandria, Virginia. The young men decided to trade positions, so Elijah's first teaching job was at Episcopal High School. The following May, having met U.S. Representative James Garland, Elijah Fletcher accepted a job as principal of New Glasgow Academy in the foothills of the Blue Ridge Mountains.

Thus, after riding one of Congressman Garland's horses and stopping at Monticello to meet Thomas Jefferson, Fletcher arrived at a 50-house village which later became Clifford in Amherst County, Virginia. There, Fletcher taught at two separate buildings for young men and women, as well as sent money back home to pay the family debts, educate his younger siblings, and give presents. One of his female students was Maria Antoinette Crawford (1792–1853), whose family lived nearby at Tusculum plantation. He wrote back to Vermont about her amiability and accomplishments, as well as being cousin to Vice President Crawford. Her father, Princeton graduate and lawyer William Sidney Crawford (1760–1815), served as clerk of Amherst County from 1792–1814 as well as a trustee of the academy. W. S. Crawford had inherited the Tusculum plantation, which may have been built by his great-grandfather or grandfather David Crawford (ca. 1697–1766); he and his wife, Sophia Penn Crawford, raised Maria and twelve other children on the plantation.

Elijah Fletcher married Maria Crawford on April 15, 1813. Four of their children survived to adulthood: Sidney Fletcher (1821–1898), Lucian Fletcher (1824–1898), Indiana, and Elizabeth Fletcher Mosby (1830–1890). Their daughter Laura (1825–1826) and another son (1828) died in infancy.

== Career ==
Elijah Fletcher soon learned to manage Tusculum, and his father-in-law appointed him administrator of his estate (which included four plantations worked directly and another three leased to tenants) before W.S. Crawford died in 1815. His mother-in-law and her children (including W.S. Crawford Jr.) lived at Tusculum until moving to Kentucky in 1837, when Elijah's eldest son Sidney began managing that plantation. Elijah and Sidney introduced modern farming methods at their farms, including deep plowing, draining wetlands, using clover as a cover crop and improved breeds of cattle, hogs, and sheep (rather than the racehorses which some of their neighbors favored).

Meanwhile, Elijah moved with his young wife to Lynchburg, about 20 miles away, where he became a successful businessman and prominent citizen. He bought land on Diamond Hill and established a household which included enslaved persons. His younger brother Calvin had joined him and was licensed to practice law in Virginia in 1819, but two years later became upset with slavery and moved back to Ohio and then to the new state of Indiana, where he established a legal practice in newly founded Indianapolis. Soon, Calvin also sent hogs to Lynchburg (using drovers until, partly at the urging of Elijah Fletcher in Virginia and Calvin Fletcher in Indianapolis, railroads were built); Elijah Fletcher fattened them on his Diamond Hill cow lot (which locals called "Fletcher's Hill"), then sold them in the area or used the James River Canal to send the fattened hogs to Richmond or points further south and east.

Beginning in 1824, Fletcher bought Tusculum from W.S. Crawford's other heirs, and would buy further plantations either directly or as payments for debts. In 1830, Fletcher bought Locust Ridge plantation from Maria's aunt and uncle and became a merchant in both cities. He renamed Locust Ridge Sweet Briar plantation, after the small pink wild rose that grew there and which Maria favored. Initially, Sweet Briar was the Fletchers' summer residence, but they moved there year-round in 1846. By 1850, Fletcher owned between 80 and 100 slaves in Amherst County plantations,

Meanwhile, in 1825 Elijah Fletcher founded The Virginian newspaper. He also served on the Lynchburg city council, and as the city's mayor in 1830 and won re-election in 1832. He worked to bring a railroad to the hill city, and later once noted that local railroad contractors preferred slave labor rather than hiring white workers because they deemed the former "equally efficient, more moral and much easier managed," an assessment with which he agreed after hiring white labor to build an addition to his house. Elijah Fletcher also helped found St. Paul's Episcopal Church in Lynchburg and Ascension Episcopal Church in Amherst, Virginia.

== Death and legacy ==
Elijah died at Sweet Briar on February 13, 1858, and was buried on his plantation. His letters would later be published, as would those of his brother Calvin.

Upon Elijah Fletcher's death in 1858, his daughter, Indiana Fletcher Williams, inherited the Sweet Briar plantation. Around 1858 in New York City, Indiana met J. Henry Williams (1831–1889), a recent graduate of General Theological Seminary, who would marry her and move to Virginia in 1865. Rev. Williams won election to in the Virginia Constitutional Convention of 1868 and later served as clerk of Amherst County. After the American Civil War ended in 1865, slaves were emancipated, but several continued to work for pay and live at Sweet Briar and other plantations. Henry and Indiana Fletcher Williams' only child, Daisy (1867–1883) predeceased her parents. When Indiana Williams died a widow in 1900, she willed the land and much of her assets to a trust, and founded Sweet Briar College for women, which opened in 1906.

Elijah's eldest son, Sidney was trained at Yale as well as in Richmond and Europe. He escorted his sisters on their European tour and briefly traveled to California with his brother Lucian, as well as practiced medicine for a time. Elijah had given Sidney the deed for Tusculum plantation in 1850, where he farmed and raised livestock until his death. Although Sidney never married officially, he had a long term relationship with a mulatto woman, and devised property to her children in 1870. He later asked a New York cousin to move to Virginia and help him and his widowed sister Indiana. John Jay Williams did so, and later learned that he had inherited the plantation, and kept it in the family for several more decades. In 2003, the Association for the Preservation of Virginia Antiquities acquired the property to prevent its demolition. Tusculum was listed on the National Register for Historic Places in 2004, but the house itself was dismantled in 2006 (archeological excavations having been conducted at various times) and plans to reassemble it on campus fell through, so it still awaits restoration. It also is the name of an institute at Sweet Briar College. Elijah Fletcher's youngest daughter, Elizabeth, married and build a plantation across from Sweet Briar, which she named Mt. San Angelo (which is now site of the Virginia Center for the Creative Arts – VCCA), but which was acquired by Indiana after her death as some nuns in Lynchburg refused the bequest, and later sold by Sweet Briar College during its first decade.

Elijah and Maria's second son, Lucian, also was educated at Yale (and, in law, at the College of William and Mary); he became the family's black sheep. Before his father's death, Lucian killed a man and fled to West Virginia, then committed further misdeeds (including another murder) that caused his father to disinherit him. Lucian would later flee to Canada, return to Amherst County, enlist in the Confederate Army (after killing another man in 1860, but soon was reduced to private and spent much of the war subject to court martial or imprisoned) and continued a "colorful" lifestyle. His children later contested Indiana Fletcher Williams' will, but settled the dispute for $25,000, which allowed the college to be formed.

== See also ==
- List of mayors of Lynchburg, Virginia
