= Carolyn L. Rose =

Archaeological and Ethnographic Conservator

- Born: March 24, 1949; Pittsburgh
- Died: August 29, 2002; Washington, D.C.
- Education: George Washington University, Sweet Briar College
- Employers: George Washington University; National Museum of Natural History

Carolyn L. Rose (March 24, 1949 – August 29, 2002) was an American archaeological conservator who worked for the Smithsonian Institution and was one of the first ethnographic conservators in the United States.

== Early life and education ==
Carolyn L. Rose (nee Rusch) was born on March 24, 1949, in Pittsburgh and raised in Washington, Pennsylvania. She was the daughter of The Reverend William G. Rusch and Ruth J. (Johnson) Rusch. She was married to Horace Rose and later to Dr. David von Endt.

== Career ==
She earned a degree in art history from Sweet Briar College, and later obtained a master's degree from George Washington University (GWU) in 1976.

She first interned as a student and then later started working for the Smithsonian as a conservation technician in 1972. She became a senior research conservator for the National Museum of Natural History in 1990. In 2000, she began her position as a chair woman at the Smithsonian Institution's anthropology department. Rose was also an adjunct associate professor at George Washington University since 1983. She created anthropological conservation, a sub-discipline ethnography.

Rose was president of the Society for the Preservation of Natural History Collections (SPNHC) from 1994 to 1995. and the Washington Conservation Guild.

== Awards and honors ==
In 1992, Rose won the Rutherford John Gettens Merit Award for contributions to the American Institute for Conservation. In 1996 and 1998, she received Exceptional Service Awards from the National Museum of Natural History. In 1996, Rose also received the Award for Outstanding Service as President of SPNHC.

In 2001, Rose was awarded SPNHC's President's Award for distinguished service as President of SPNHC. In 2002, Rose was awarded SPNHC's Award for distinguished service and lifetime contribution to SPNHC's mission and values.

Rose was awarded the President's Medal at George Washington University. George Washington University President Stephen Joel Trachtenberg described her as a "one-woman graduate school," due to having taught many ethnographic and archaeological conservators.

== Death and legacy ==
Carolyn L. Rose died of cancer on August 29, 2002, in Washington, D.C. She is survived by her husband, mother, siblings, daughter, and grandchildren. The Society for the Preservation of Natural History Collections' highest honor – SPNHC Award – was renamed in Carolyn Rose's honor. In 2025, at the annual SPNHC meeting, the Carolyn L. Rose award was presented to Suzanne Boyer McLaren from the Carnegie Museum of Natural History. Dr. Hanna M. Szczepanowska dedicated her 2012 textbook, Conservation of Cultural Heritage: Key Principles and Approaches, in memory of Rose.

== Publications ==
- Examination and Stabilization of two Bull Mummies (1978)
- Protein Chemistry for Conservators (1984) Editor
- Ethical and Practical Considerations in Conserving Ethnographic Museum Objects (~1998)
- Storage of Natural History Collections: Ideas and Practical Solutions (1992)
- Preserving Natural Science Collections: Chronicle of Our Environmental Heritage (1993) – Preface
