= Yeargin =

Yeargin is a surname. Notable people with the surname include:

- Al Yeargin (1901–1937), American baseball player
- Marshalyn Yeargin-Allsopp, American epidemiologist
- Nancy Yeargin (born 1955), American tennis player
- Nicole Yeargin (born 1997), British athlete
