= Maurice Pate =

American humanitarian (1894–1965)

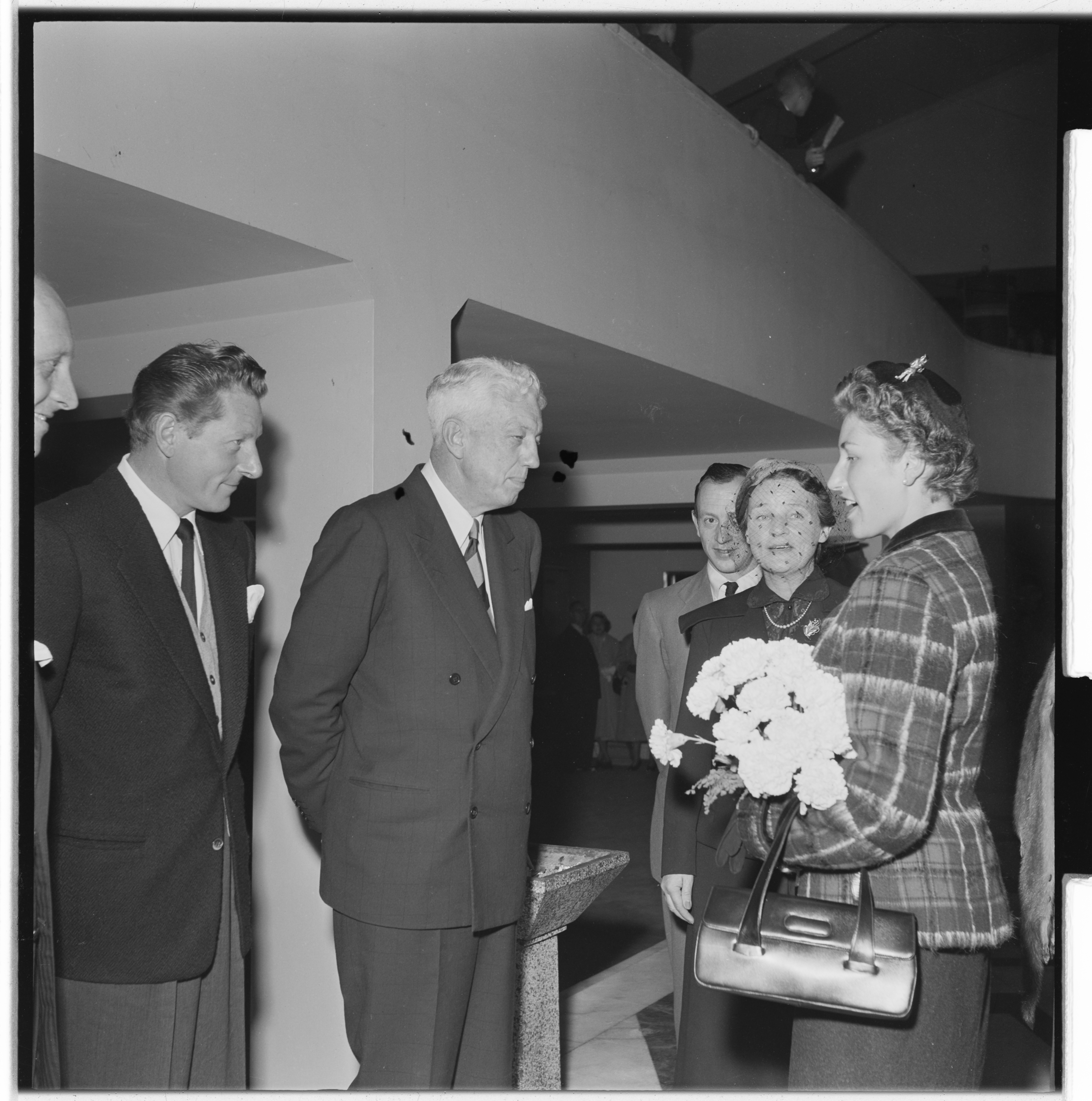
- Pate (center) with Princess Astrid, Mrs. Ferner and Danny Kaye

Executive Director of UNICEF
- In office January 1947 – January 19, 1965
- Secretary General: Trygve Lie; Dag Hammarskjöld; U Thant
- Preceded by: Position established
- Succeeded by: Henry Labouisse

Personal details
- Born: October 14, 1894 Pender, Nebraska, US
- Died: January 19, 1965 (aged 70) New York City, New York, US
- Spouses: Jadwiga Mankowska (m. 1927; div. 1937); Martha Lucas (m. 1961)
- Education: Princeton University

Maurice Pate (October 14, 1894 – January 19, 1965) was an American humanitarian and businessman. Pate served as the first executive director of the United Nations Children's Fund (UNICEF) from 1947 until his death in 1965, after being proposed by the Chairman Ludwik Rajchman.

Talking about the United Nations, Dag Hammarskjöld, its second Secretary-General, said, "The work of UNICEF is at the heart of the matter - and at the heart of UNICEF is Maurice Pate." Herbert Hoover called Pate "the most effective human angel I know" when introducing Pate at a UNICEF dinner. Pate was recognized worldwide for his efforts on behalf of children and hungry people.

== Early years ==
Pate was born in Pender, Nebraska, to Richard E. Pate and Rachel Davis Pate, of Welsh and Irish ancestry respectively. He was the oldest of seven children, three of whom died in infancy. His family moved to Denver, Colorado, when he was three years old. He graduated from East Denver High School in Denver, Colorado, in 1911, then left Denver for Princeton University. At Princeton he was a member of Phi Beta Kappa, worked on the undergraduate Red Cross Committee, and earned a bachelor of science degree in mathematics and physics in 1915, with high honors.

He went to work for the First National Bank in Hartley, Iowa, where his uncle was president, immediately after graduation and stayed until the United States joined World War I. After a great deal of persuasion, he worked for Herbert Hoover's Commission for Relief in Belgium, which began a lifelong friendship and collaboration. then served in the American Expeditionary Force with the 29th Engineers in France. After the war ended, Pate helped organize and direct efforts by the American Relief Administration to feed more than one million Polish children after the war.

Pate worked for Standard Oil of New Jersey in Poland from 1922 to 1927 doing financial and sales work. He married Jadwiga Mankowska, a Polish socialite, in 1927, managed Polish import and banking business, and returned to the United States in 1935 as an investment banker and businessman. Missing her family and home, Jadwiga divorced Pate in 1937 and returned to Poland, but the two remained friends until her death in 1960.

== UNICEF ==
Upon the outbreak of World War II in 1939, Pate led the Commission for Polish Relief, and later joined the American Red Cross as director of relief supplies for POWs in Asia and Europe. He conducted food surveys with Herbert Hoover in 1946 and 1947 – 38 countries in 76 days – and the two men planned UNICEF. Pate joined UNICEF at its inception in January 1947. He agreed to serve as the director upon the condition that UNICEF serve the children of "ex-enemy countries", regardless of race or politics.

Initially, UNICEF was charged with combating the threats posed to children in Europe from disease and famine after World War II. The growing concern about child welfare and survival rates in developing countries, either from disease or starvation, led to the establishment of UNICEF as a continuing agency in 1953. Under Pate's leadership, UNICEF implemented programs to improve maternal and child health using low cost, preventive health care measures. Considerable progress was made to eradicate malaria, tuberculosis, whooping cough, and diphtheria. Vaccinations, breast feeding for children and rehydration therapy for diarrhea were emphasized to improve public health.

== Later years and death ==
Pate received many honors and awards for his humanitarian work. He received decorations from the governments of Belgium, France, Poland, Netherlands, and Ecuador, received an honorary degree from Denison University in 1956, and an honorary PhD from Princeton in 1958. Pate was awarded the Albert Lasker Public Service Award in 1959. He declined a nomination for the Nobel Peace Prize in 1960 because he felt the contributions of the entire UNICEF organization should be recognized instead of one individual’s contribution.

Pate married Martha Lucas in 1961, one year after his former wife, Jadwiga, had died. Lucas Pate was successively assistant dean of Radcliffe College and president of Sweet Briar College (1946-1950), and served on the board of the United Negro College Fund and the national selection committee for Fulbright Scholars, and was active in UNESCO, which had many concurrent activities with UNICEF. Therefore, the Pates not only had complementary activities but could travel together most of the time.

Pate died suddenly of a heart attack at Bellevue Hospital in Manhattan on January 19, 1965, only a few months before he was to retire. When he died, UNICEF had more than 550 long-term programs and had helped over 55 million children in 116 countries. Nine months after Pate died, UNICEF was awarded the 1965 Nobel Peace Prize.

Pate's organization, the Maurice Pate Institute for Human Survival, donated his 100-acre (40.5 ha) property in Redding, Connecticut to the Mahayana Sutra and Tantra Center of Connecticut (now called Do Ngak Kunphen Ling Tibetan Buddhist Center for Universal Peace) in 1997.

== Maurice Pate Leadership for Children Award ==
The UNICEF Maurice Pate Leadership for Children Award, for "extraordinary example and exemplary innovation and inspirational leadership in contributing to the advancement of the UNICEF mandate for children on a national, regional and global scale," was established after his death in 1965 and is named in his honor.

== See also ==
- Timeline of young people's rights in the United Kingdom
- Timeline of young people's rights in the United States
- Dag Hammarskjöld – Secretary-General of the United Nations
- John D. Rockefeller III – American philanthropist involved in international health and children's welfare
- Children's rights

Diplomatic posts
New office	Executive Director of UNICEF; 1947–1965	Succeeded by Henry Labouisse
