= Martha Lucas Pate =

American administrator

Martha B. Lucas Pate

4th President of Sweet Briar College
- In office 1946–1950
- Preceded by: Meta Glass
- Succeeded by: Anne Gary Pannell

Personal details
- Born: November 27, 1912 Louisville, Kentucky, U.S.
- Died: May 16, 1983 (aged 70) New York City, U.S.
- Education: Goucher College; George Washington University; University of London
- Profession: educator, administrator, philanthropist

Martha Bob Lucas Pate (November 27, 1912 – May 16, 1983) was a Kentucky-born administrator of colleges and organizations dedicated to international affairs, education, humanitarian aid, and religion. She was best known for her tenure as the fourth president of Sweet Briar College from 1946 to 1950. After the Board of the college refused to integrate the school in 1949, she left to become active in the United Negro College Fund, the Foreign Policy Association, the Council on Religion and International Affairs, the Fund for Theological Education, the Institute for International Education, the Fund for Peace, and the New York Medical College, to name a few. She spent the last few years of her life lobbying against nuclear weapons.

== Early life ==
Martha Lucas was born in Louisville, Kentucky, on November 27, 1912. Her father, Robert H. Lucas, was a lawyer who briefly served as the United States Commissioner of Internal Revenue (1929–1930). He was also an executive director of the Republican National Committee, and unsuccessful candidate for the U.S. Senate in 1936. Lucas spoke of highly of her father in interviews and in writing over the years, referring to him as "a political leader." Her mother was Gertrude Lasch Lucas. Lucas attended J.M. Atherton High School - a high school for women - in Louisville, graduating in 1929.

Lucas began her college studies at Vassar College in 1931, but transferred to Goucher College, graduating from there in 1933 with honors and a degree in English. She earned her master's degree in Philosophy in 1935 from George Washington University. From 1935 to 1939 Lucas traveled extensively in Europe, studying at the Alliance Francaise and at Sorbonne University in Paris. In 1940 she received her Ph.D. in philosophy from the University of London, having enjoyed studying with students from all over the world. Her years abroad and the friendships she made there significantly influenced her devotion to global issues for the rest of her life.

== Career ==
In 1941, at age 28, Lucas landed her first professional employment as dean of students and associate professor of philosophy and religion at Westhampton College, which was a part of the University of Richmond in Richmond, Virginia. Westhampton was dedicated to the education of women, as was Sweet Briar College where Lucas would continue her administrative career. Lucas was hired during the tenure of Dean May Keller, who like Lucas had also graduated from Goucher and earned her Ph.D. abroad. Three years later Lucas became assistant dean at Radcliffe College, and two years later, at age 33, she accepted the presidency of Sweet Briar College in Amherst, Virginia. The previous president, Meta Glass, announced that she would retire at age 65 after 21 years of service to that college.

When Lucas was inaugurated at Sweet Briar in 1946, "she was one of the youngest college presidents in the nation at a time when only six women presided over college administrations." While at Sweet Briar, Lucas increased student government, dividing its functions into executive and judicial functions and holding many meetings to assess the educational process. She also brought speakers and professors from across the country and world to campus, assumed leadership of the Junior Year Abroad program from the University of Delaware and emphasized the importance of educating women for global citizenship. She wrote,

If we are to educate for world awareness and enlarged moral responsibility, we must enable our people to see their own civilization in the larger context of world history and many cultures. We must acquire a sympathetic understanding of the values and aspirations which determine the thinking and acting of human beings in the vast areas of eastern Europe, Asia, Africa, South America, and the islands of the many seas. We must study [them] . . . not as . . . remote and antique culture but as a living and dynamic factor in our present world.

While president of Sweet Briar College, Lucas also oversaw the establishment of the Lyman Lectures on the Philosophy of Religion series in 1948, and a long-sought Phi Beta Kappa chapter in 1949. She also served on the national selection committee for Fulbright Scholars.

Lucas represented the United States at the Universities Preparatory Conference of 1948 held by UNESCO in Utrecht, the Netherlands. In 1949 President Truman chose her to represent the United States at a meeting of UNESCO in Paris. George V. Allen, the assistant secretary of state for public affairs, headed the delegation, which also included: Milton S. Eisenhower, Luther H. Evans, and Reinhold Niebuhr. The meeting was held from September 19 through October 5 of 1949. On October 6, 1949, Sweet Briar College issued a press release announcing President Lucas' resignation. She left the college after overseeing commencement in May 1950, and officially planned to devote her time to writing.

In 1975, the Milwaukee Journal reported that Lucas "left [Sweet Briar College] after trying unsuccessfully to persuade the school's directors to amend the school's charter, which restricted the college to white women students." Remarks Lucas made at Goucher College during her 1948 inauguration speech for that institution's incoming president Dr. Otto Kraushaar expressed her distaste for segregation:

Basically, we can work with all our hearts and minds toward an affirmation, in keeping with recent proclamations by UNESCO and the United Nations, of the human rights and fundamental freedoms for all the people of the world, even for our own compatriots and neighbors who may differ from us in religion or in race. It would, undoubtedly, be more convincing for our students if we who teach and lead the young actually ordered our lives as if we really believed it to be so - - as if we really condemned the blind and bigoted treatment of minority groups in this country, for the Nazi master-racism that it is.

Goucher's first African American student, Jewell Robinson, arrived in 1955. Eleven years later, long after Lucas' resignation and shortly after passage of the Civil Rights Act of 1964 and over opposition of Virginia's attorney general, Sweet Briar College integrated.

== Portrait ==
In 1952, an official portrait of Dr. Lucas was delivered to Sweet Briar College. The portrait, a gift from the class of 1950 to the college, was the work of the Swedish painter Lotte Laserstein-Marcus. Lucas chose Laserstein-Marcus because she owned a pastel by the artist and thought highly of her work. Lucas sat for the artist in Stockholm, Sweden during the summer of 1951. The painting was described as a "rather informal treatment . . . [Lucas] is wearing a dress in two shades of blue, instead of academic regalia, and . . . is holding a book in one hand, with a terrestrial globe beside her." Her afghan hound, Xanadra, is also shown, sitting beside Lucas in the portrait. The portrait hangs in the Mary Helen Cochran Library.

== Later years ==
After leaving Sweet Briar College, Lucas spent ten years traveling extensively and writing. She became Executive Director of the Office of University and College Relations at the Institute of International Education in 1961. In 1961 she also became chair of the schools division of the United Negro College Fund. She joined the board of directors for that organization in 1967. Throughout the 1960s Lucas served as a chair, trustee, or board member of many recognizable organizations such as the New York Medical College, Reading for the Blind, the National Scholastic Awards, the Columbia School of Social Work, the Fund for Peace, the Fund for Theological Education, the Richmond, Virginia YWCA, and Goucher College.

In the 1970s she continued serving in roles as committee member, regent, board member or trustee for an even larger number of organizations which included the Dana Fellowship Committee, the National Commission on U.S. - China Relations, UNICEF, Georgetown University, the New York School of Psychiatry, the Ralph Bunch Memorial Project, the Institute for Study of World Politics, the Center for the Deaf, and for Global Perspectives in Education. During her lifetime she also received awards which included her decoration as chevalier in the French Legion of Honor in 1947; the U.N. International Women's Year Award in 1975; and the Patrick Healy Award in 1981.

In an article she wrote for the Sweet Briar College Alumnae Magazine in 1977, Lucas described her strategy for finding opportunities to serve the common good. She said:

All of my work has been professional and usually pro bono publico. When I resigned from Sweet Briar, I expressed my conviction that it is imperative at this crucial time in the world's history that each individual put himself in a position to make what he feels will be his most useful contribution to the needs of society, to the survival of thoughtful, ethical life on our planet. Particularly in my own fields of philosophy and comparative religion, and as an ethicist and Internationalist, I felt a 'categorical imperative' to think, speak and act according to my moral insights, free of institutional restraints.

In the last years of her life she advocated for better nutritional information and holistic medical practices to be incorporated into traditional Western medical schools. But her main focus was on global nuclear disarmament. She worked with the Fund for Peace and the Center for Defense Information to produce articles and television shows to inform the public.

== Personal life ==
The Lynchburg Daily Advance called Lucas "a tall, striking young woman with short brown hair and intelligent eyes," when she arrived on the campus of Sweet Briar College in 1946. That same year former colleagues at Westhampton were quoted as saying that she was "a very attractive and magnetic woman, with an able mind, a great spirit, and a quality for leadership." Her eyes were "bright blue." The middle initial "B" in her name stood for "Bob."

On Tuesday, October 31, 1961, Martha B. Lucas married Maurice Pate at Riverside Church in New York City. Mr. Pate was a founder and director of UNICEF. Lucas had met Pate through Helen Keller, who was a mutual friend. Keller and the Pates lived, close enough to be called neighbors, in West Redding, CT. Mr. Pate died of a heart attack on January 20, 1965.

Throughout her life Lucas kept Afghan Hounds. While President of Sweet Briar College she had an Afghan Hound named Xanadra, which she called Xani. Xani went everywhere with Lucas, accompanying her to the office, and was even included in Lucas' official portrait at Sweet Briar College. At age 69 she continued to live with two of that breed of dog who traveled with her frequently.

== Death and legacy ==
Martha Lucas Pate died on May 16, 1983, at the Memorial Sloan-Kettering Cancer Center in New York City. She was 70 years old. Her funeral service was held May 21, 1983, at the Cathedral of St. John the Divine. Her 100-acre estate in Redding, Connecticut became the Do Ngak Kunphen Ling Tibetan Buddhist Center for Universal Peace in 2006.

Lucas was an idealist whose personal and educational aim was always to keep a global perspective in mind. "I am utterly an internationalist; a citizen of the world," she said, expressing a sentiment that was repeated often. She firmly believed that education in the humanities or by the liberal arts could refine human nature. "Changing human nature is just what liberal education is all about," she said. "Its a tremendous task that almost overwhelm[s] you. But it can be done." She also envisioned religion working as a unifying force between peoples, as an agent of peace. "The major religious cultures are working toward the same goal - the brotherhood of man. Yet they seem so woefully ignorant of each other, and this ignorance is holding them apart," she observed. "I sincerely believe that the religious forces in the world can do more to help us reach our goal . . . so that, united they can exert all the pressure of which I feel they are capable."
