= Elizabeth Friench Johnson =

American college professor

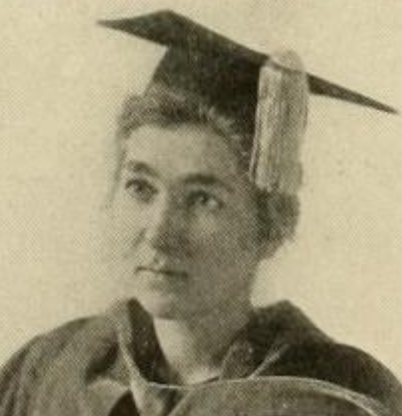
- Elizabeth Friench Johnson, from a 1921 yearbook
- Born: March 21, 1890; Manassas, Virginia
- Died: February 21, 1979 (aged 88); Rock Hill, South Carolina
- Occupation: College professor
- Notable work: Weckherlin's Eclogues of the Seasons (1922)

Elizabeth Friench Johnson (March 21, 1890 – February 21, 1979) was an American college professor. She was head of the modern languages department at Winthrop College in South Carolina, from 1922 to 1955. She also taught at Sweet Briar College and Centre College.

== Early life ==
Johnson was born in Manassas, Virginia, the daughter of Joseph Benjamin Johnson and Fannie Simpson Johnson. She graduated from Goucher College in 1911, and completed her doctoral studies in 1916 at Johns Hopkins University. Her research involved German literature and philology; her dissertation title was Weckherlin's Eclogues of the Seasons (1922). She was a member of the Phi Beta Kappa honor society.

== Career ==
Johnson taught at Sweet Briar College from 1917 to 1921. From 1922 to 1955, Johnson was head of the modern languages department at Winthrop College. She hosted meetings of the school's German club in her home. and chaired the board of advisors for the Rock Hill YWCA. After she retired from Winthrop, she was a visiting professor of Centre College in Danville, Kentucky.

Johnson was president of the South Carolina chapter of the American Association of University Women (AAUW), and of the American Association of French Teachers. From 1937 to 1940, she was poet laureate of the South Carolina Federation of Women's Clubs. She addressed the annual meeting of the South Carolina Teachers' Association in 1926. She was active in the South Atlantic regional gatherings of the Modern Language Association. She was a member of the South Carolina State Council on Teacher Education. In 1955, she was a judge at a national French contest, held in Pennsylvania.

Johnson was active in the Episcopal Church, and was a serious gardener. She was the 1956 South Carolina winner of the Houbigant Grand National Quelques Fleurs French Garden Merit Scroll, for her garden layout.

== Personal life ==
Johnson died in 1979, aged 88 years, in Rock Hill, South Carolina. In 1970, she donated her papers to the library at Winthrop University. She also donated a collection of bulletins from the Carolina Bird Club, Inc.
