= Carrie Brown (author) =

American novelist

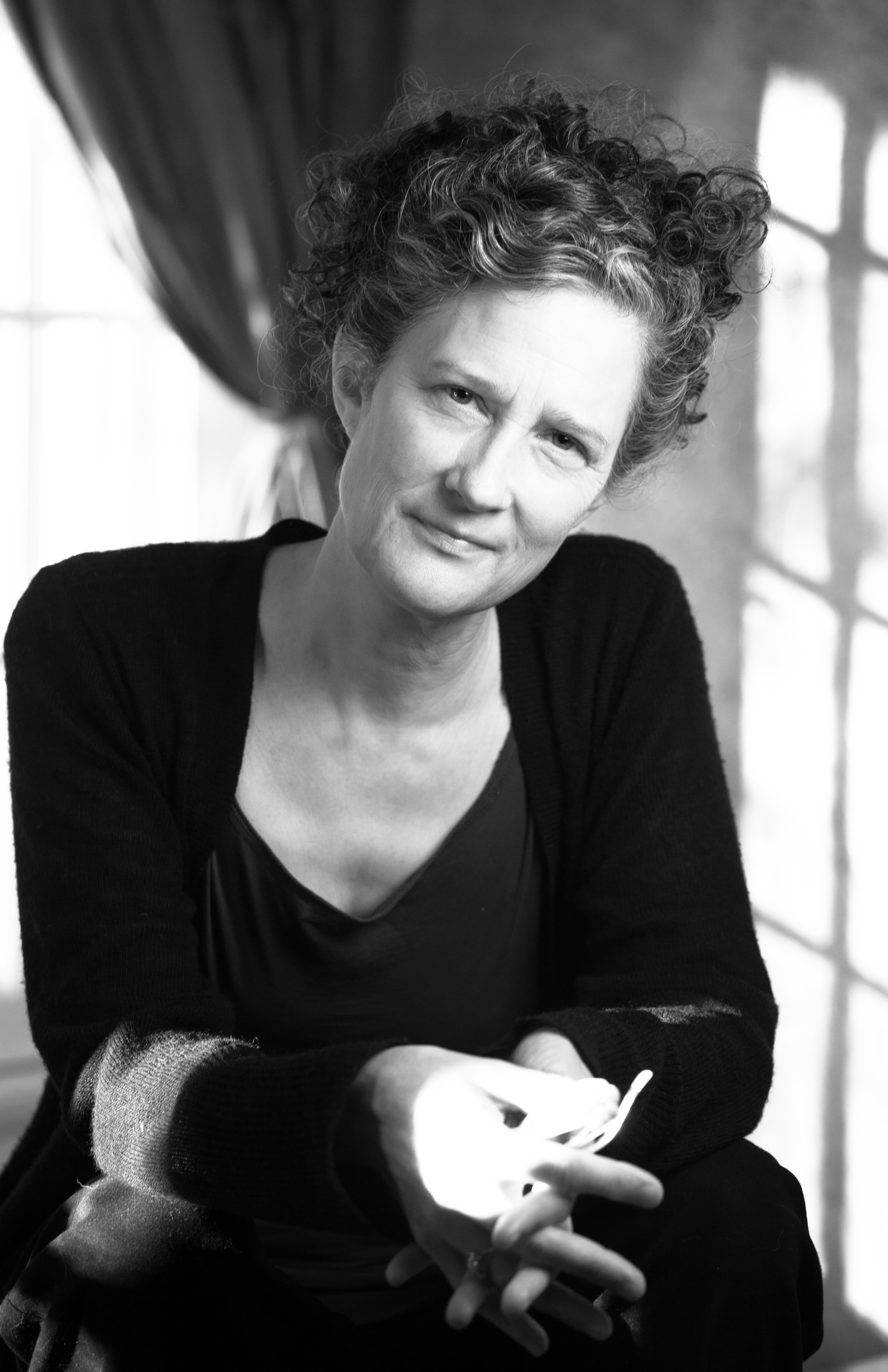
- Born: May 29, 1959 (age 66) Connecticut, United States
- Occupation: Novelist, professor
- Education: Brown University (BA); University of Virginia (MFA)
- Spouse: John Gregory Brown

Website
- www.authorcarriebrown.com

Carrie Brown (born May 29, 1959) is an American novelist. She is the author of seven novels and a collection of short stories. She is a writer-in-residence at Sweet Briar College in Amherst County, Virginia. Her most recent novel, The Stargazer's Sister, was published by Pantheon Books in January 2016.

== Background and education ==
A Greenwich, Connecticut native, Brown graduated from Choate Rosemary Hall in 1975. Brown received her Bachelor of Arts from Brown University in 1981 and her Master of Fine Arts from the University of Virginia, where she was a Henry Hoyns Fellow, in 1998. She has taught at The University of North Carolina at Greensboro and became an English professor at Sweet Briar College after serving as Margaret Banister Writer-in-Residence. She lives with her husband, the novelist John Gregory Brown, in Sweet Briar, Virginia.

== Work ==
- Rose's Garden (Algonquin 1998), Brown's first novel, won the Barnes & Noble Discover Great New Writers Award. The New York Times Book Review deemed it "A magical first novel...both luminous and wise".
- Lamb in Love (Algonquin 1999), was her second novel. In a starred review Publishers Weekly wrote "Brown eloquently explores the terrain of human interactions, showing how genuine love can exalt ordinary individuals." The New York Times Book Review called the novel "unconventional and eloquent".
- The Hatbox Baby (Algonquin 2000) won the 2001 Library of Virginia Literary Award, the 2001 Great Lakes Independent Booksellers Association Award, and the 2000 Janet Heidinger Kafka Prize.
- The House on Belle Isle (Algonquin 2002), Brown's story collection, was a finalist for the 2003 Library of Virginia Literary Award, and the Chicago Tribune called it "rich in image and insight, gracefully written and peopled with characters who quietly demand our loving attention".
- Confinement (Algonquin 2004) won the 2005 Library of Virginia Literary Award. In its review of the book, People Magazine wrote: "This beautiful novel maps the emotional life of a World War II refugee who becomes trapped in his new existence in America" and called it "part Sophie's Choice, part Anne Tyler".
- The Rope Walk (Pantheon 2007) was a finalist for the 2008 Library of Virginia Literary Award and the 2008 Library of Virginia People's Choice Award, and it was named the 2009 All Iowa Reads Book by the Iowa Public Library. Washington Post Book World called the novel "gentle, lyrical" and the New Orleans Times-Picayune said: "reading this novel is a serious pleasure."
- The Last First Day (Pantheon 2013), her sixth novel. Publishers Weekly said it "falls short as a whole" and that "the plot crawls forward" very slowly, but Carol Gladstein of Booklist called it "a well-crafted, meaningful story of two people and the long, happy life they have shared".
- The Stargazer's Sister (Pantheon 2016), her most recent novel.

== Awards and honors ==
- The Barnes & Noble Discover New Writers Award – 1998 (Rose's Garden)
- The Library of Virginia Literary Award – winner 2001 (The Hatbox Baby), 2005 (Confinement); finalist 2003 (The House on Belle Isle), 2007 (The Rope Walk)
- Janet Heidinger Kafka Prize – 2000 (The Hatbox Baby)
- Great Lakes Independent Booksellers Association Award – 2001 (The Hatbox Baby)
- Library of Virginia People's Choice Award – Finalist 2008 (The Rope Walk)
- National Endowment for the Arts fellowship
