= Anna Chao Pai =

American geneticist

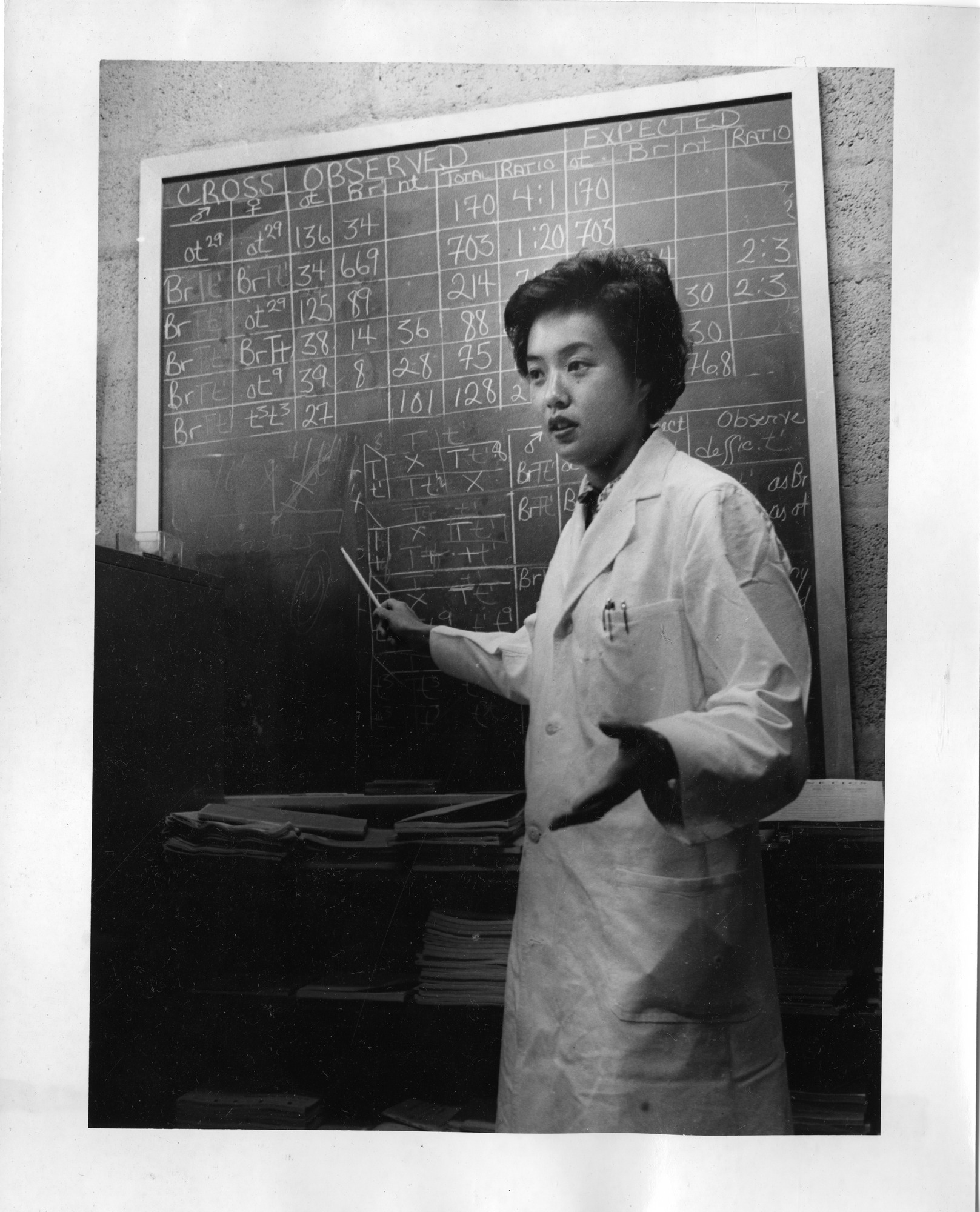
- Pai as a predoctoral student at Albert Einstein College of Medicine (photo: Smithsonian Institution Archives)
- Traditional Chinese: 趙守偀
- Simplified Chinese: 赵守偀
Transcriptions
Standard Mandarin
- Hanyu Pinyin: Zhào Shǒuyīng
- Wade–Giles: Chao^{4} Shou^{3}-ying^{1}

Anna Chao Pai (born 1935) is an American geneticist and professor emerita at Montclair State University.

== Biography ==
Anna Chao was born in Beijing, China. Her maternal grandfather was the Northeast China-based warlord Zhang Zuolin, who was assassinated by the Japanese in 1928. Following the Japanese invasion of Northeast China in 1931, Chao's parents fled the region, first to Beijing where she was born, and then to the United States. They would make only one more visit to China together as a family, in 1939, and after the Communists won the Chinese Civil War in 1949, her parents had no further desire to return to their country of birth. She herself would finally re-visit the country first in 1985 and then in 1988, accompanying her husband on business trips, then finally on a family trip to Shenyang and other sites important to her family in 2005.

She enrolled at Sweet Briar College, where she earned freshman and Dean's List honors. and was known by the nickname Chips, Working part-time as a waitress, and playing on four varsity sports teams, she earned a B.A.degree in zoology at Sweet Briar (1957). She later earned a master's degree in embryology from Bryn Mawr College (1959), and a Ph.D. in developmental genetics from the Sue Golding Graduate Division of Albert Einstein College of Medicine (1964) in New York, and worked as a researcher and professor at Montclair State University in New Jersey.(1969-1997) She served on the Board of Directors at Sweet Briar College from 1984 to 1992. During that tenure, she was responsible for the college to develop a College Honors Program and the Bachelor of Science degree. She also was responsible for the development of a College Honors Program at Montclair State University.

She married David Pai (白先忠) in 1959 and the marriage lasted until 2016 when her husband succumbed to cardiovascular problems. Pai was a son of the National Revolutionary Army general Bai Chongxi, who had worked with her uncle Marshal Zhang Xueliang during the Kuomintang Northern Expedition. In 2009 they moved to Davidson, North Carolina.

== Publications ==
She is the author of the genetics textbooks Foundations of Genetics: A Science for Society (McGraw-Hill 1974, ISBN 978-0070480933) written for non-scientists to inform them of the rising importance of the science of genetics for the general population. It was published in a second edition in 1985 ISBN 0-07-048094-X. In 2009, she authored a science fiction novel, "Choices" about genetic engineering ISBN 978-1-4349-0339-6, Dorrance Publishing Co., Inc., under the pseudonym, A.C. White. In 2019 autobiography "From Manchurian Princess to the American Dream" was published by iUniverse.

== Awards and recognition ==
- Outstanding Young Women of America, 1964
- Phi Beta Kappa Society, 1972, Theta of Virginia chapter at Sweet Briar College
- 1995 Margaret and Herman Sokol Faculty Fellow Award at Montclair State College
- Sweet Briar College "Distinguished Alumna", 1994
- Elected Charter member of Sweet Briar College Athletic Hall of Fame, 2006
