= Seth Clabough =

American writer

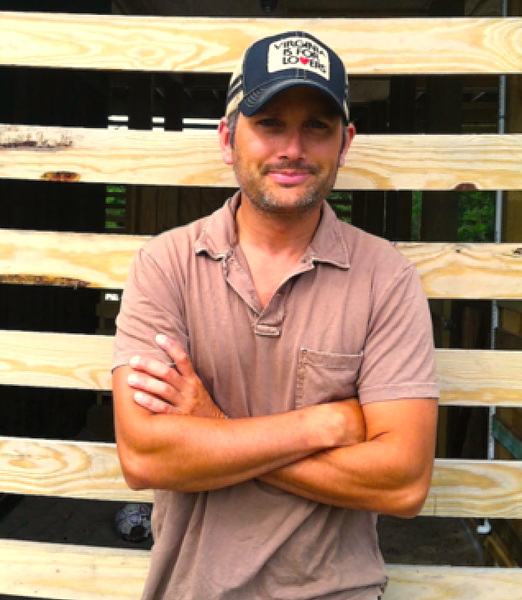
Author Seth Clabough

Seth Clabough is an American poet and fiction writer with Pushcart Prize nominations in both genres and author of the novel All Things Await, which was nominated for the 2017 Library of Virginia Literary Award for Fiction.

Clabough's work has been published in anthologies, journals, and magazines ranging from Image Journal, Prairie Schooner, Blackbird: an online journal of literature & the arts and Aesthetica magazine to The Chronicle of Higher Education and New Writing: the International Journal for the Practice and Theory of Creative Writing. He has literary representation through Inkwell Management in New York and currently works at Randolph–Macon College as an English professor and Director of the Communication Center after holding similar positions at Sweet Briar College and Longwood University.

== Nominations and awards ==
- West Trade Review – Pushcart Prize Fiction Nomination ("The Cabin") 2022
- Roanoke Review – Pushcart Prize Poetry Nomination ("Cover Letter") 2021
- Ploughshares – National 'Best Short Story of the Week' selection ("Und So Weiter") 2017
- Smokelong Quarterly – Editor's Selection ("Story with a Gallinule's Wing in it") 2017
- Queen's Ferry Press Award – Editor Nominated 2016
- Best of the Net 2016 – Editor Nominated 2016
- Alternating Current – Luminaire Award for Best Prose ("It Won't Always Be Like This") 2015
- storySouth - Million Writer Award: Notable Story ("To Become Immortal") 2015
- Luigi Bonomi & Associates (London) – LBA Prize for Fiction (UWA)

== Education ==
- University of Wales, Aberystwyth (PhD)
- University of South Carolina (MA)
- Randolph-Macon College (BA)
