= All Things Await =

2016 novel by Seth Clabough

All Things Await

All Things Await is a novel written by American author Seth Clabough, published by Savant Books in June 2016. It was nominated for the Library of Virginia Literary Award for Fiction.
