= Eva Matthews Sanford =

American classical philologist (1894-1954)

- Born: 6 July 1894; Nebraska City
- Died: 26 March 1954 (aged 59); Roanoke, Virginia
- Parent(s): Edgar Lewis and Anna Eugenia (Munson) Sanford

Academic background
- Education: Radcliffe College, Harvard University
- Thesis: Quibus rationibus auctorum Latinorum opera in libris manuscriptis collecta sint

Academic work
- Discipline: Classics, Medieval History
- Institutions: Western Reserve University, Sweet Briar College
- Notable works: The Mediterranean World in Ancient Times

Eva Matthews Sanford (6 July 1894 – 26 March 1954) was a scholar of Classical and Medieval history and Assistant Professor of History at Sweet Briar College. Sanford is known for her work on the Medieval sources for Classical texts, particularly works of Juvenal and Augustine.

== Family ==
Sanford's father was Edgar L. Sanford, a canon of the Episcopal Church in Trenton, New Jersey. Her sister Vera Sanford was a professor of mathematics and author of textbooks at State Teachers College at Oneonta, New York.

== Career ==
Sanford gained her AB from Radcliffe College in 1916. Following some years at Yale University (1917-1919), Sanford obtained her MA and PhD from Harvard University in 1922 and 1923 with the thesis "Quibus rationibus auctorum Latinorum opera in libris manuscriptis collecta sint". She was then a Whitney Travelling Fellow at the American Academy in Rome in 1923–4. Sanford was a member of the faculty of Mather College and of the graduate school of Western Reserve University in Cleveland until 1937 when she was appointed Assistant Professor of History at Sweet Briar College. Shortly afterwards Sanford published her textbook The Mediterranean World in Ancient Times (New York 1938) which became a standard reference for students and a revised edition was published in 1951.

Sanford's work focused on the translation, understanding, and transmission of the medieval sources for classical literature. She was the section editor for commentaries of Latin authors 1300–1600 in the Bibliographical Guide to Medieval and Renaissance Commentaries and Translations of Classical Authors and also consulting editor for the Corpus of Roman Law. As a Fulbright Scholar in 1950, Sanford travelled to Italy and France in search of Medieval commentaries on Juvenal.

Sanford was also engaged in early work on finger signs in calculations in antiquity and published a text on the subject in 1928.

Before she died, Sanford was in the process of translating the De Civitate Dei of Augustine for the Loeb Classical Library. Her work on books XVI-XVIII was subsequently completed by William M. Green and published as LCL 415 in 1965.

An obituary for Sanford was published in the American Historical Review in July 1954.

== Select publications ==
- 'Honorius, Presbyter and Scholasticus' Speculum 23 (3): pp. 397–425 (1948)
- The Mediterranean World in Ancient Times (New York 1938)
- Salvian: On the Government of God (1930)
