= Meta Glass =

American classics scholar and college administrator

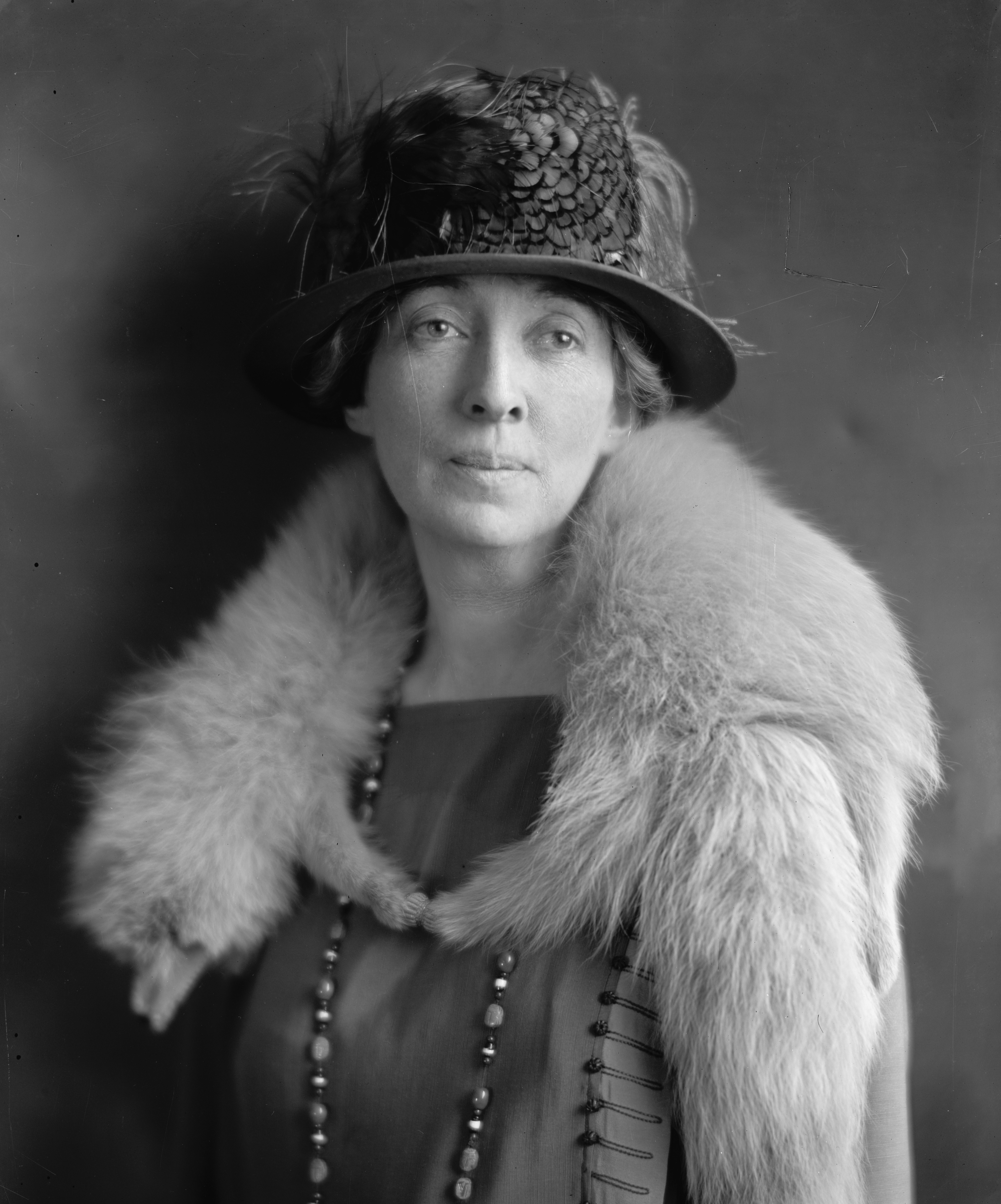
- Meta Glass in 1905

3rd President of Sweet Briar College
- In office 1925–1946
- Preceded by: Emilie Watts McVea
- Succeeded by: Martha B. Lucas

Personal details
- Born: August 16, 1880 Petersburg, Virginia, U.S.
- Died: March 20, 1967 (aged 86) Charlottesville, Virginia, U.S.
- Education: Randolph-Macon Woman's College; Columbia University
- Profession: educator, administrator

Meta Glass (August 16, 1880 – March 20, 1967) was an American classics scholar, educator, and college administrator. From 1925 through 1946, she was the third president of Sweet Briar College. She was also president of the Association of American Colleges and the American Association of University Women for several years.

== Early life ==
Meta Glass was born in 1880 in Petersburg, Virginia to newspaperman and former Confederate Major Robert Henry Glass and his second wife, Meta Sanford Glass. Her older half-brother was Carter Glass.

== Education ==
Glass received an MA from Randolph-Macon Woman's College in Lynchburg, Virginia in 1899. She also studied at Cornell University in 1903.

She earned a PhD degree in classics from Columbia University in 1913, although she had known no Greek before beginning that program. Between 1929 and 1946 she received eight honorary doctorates as well.

== Career ==
=== Teaching career ===
Upon graduating from Randolph-Macon Woman's College, Glass taught for a year at the Wytheville female seminary, then taught a year at a similar institution in Mt. Sterling, Kentucky, and then taught German for a year at her alma mater Randolph-Macon Woman's College. She also taught Latin for four years at Roanoke High School.

She was then an instructor at Randolph-Macon Women's College for three years. She knew about the newly formed Sweet Briar College, but was told in 1906 that no positions were open. Shortly before completing her PhD at Columbia she gained a position as adjunct professor of Latin at Randolph-Macon Women's College in 1912.

As the U.S. entered World War I in 1917, Glass traveled to France on behalf of the Lynchburg Y.W.C.A. as its secretary, and then trained nurses and assisted with the war effort. She remained in France after the war's end and in Paris she trained European women in social work. For her work in France, she was awarded the Medal of French Gratitude.

Upon returning to the U.S., she assisted the director of Columbia University's adult-education University Extension, and taught Latin and Greek as an assistant professor at the university itself. While at Columbia, she declined an invitation from Sweet Briar's second president, Emilie McVea, to become that college's dean, although she ultimately succeeded McVea as president when ill health forced McVea to retire.

=== Sweet Briar College president ===
Glass became the third President of Sweet Briar College on November 13, 1925, in a ceremony at which Bryn Mawr's Marion Park gave the principal address and Randolph-Macon Women's College president D. R. Anderson delivered greetings from Virginia's colleges.

During her 21-year presidency, Glass introduced interdepartmental majors and established the honors program. The library grew from 11,000 volumes to 62,000 volumes. In 1958, 12 years after her retirement, the college's board noted that during her tenure, among many other things, "Sweet Briar College became nationally recognized for academic excellence. ... The faculty was increased from 38 to 55 members – scholarly men and women drawn from the best colleges and universities in this country and abroad. [She instituted] comprehensive examinations, and the Junior Year at St. Andrews and in Paris, [and] such new major offerings as Music, Art, and Religion. The Daisy Williams Gymnasium [and] the Book Shop ... were also added to the campus. ..."

As her term started, Sweet Briar had small endowment of $132,947 (and building indebtedness which exceeded it by $97,000), so she began a fundraising drive. While the Association of Colleges and Secondary Schools of the Southern States had accredited Sweet Briar under her predecessor, it was on a conditional list because its endowment did not reach the $500,000 minimum (excluding real estate), even before the stock market crash of 1929. Despite limiting some building projects, in her first five years as president, she secured funds for a new library from private benefactors as well as the Carnegie Foundation, secured alumni support to build a gymnasium, and rebuilt the original manor, Sweet Briar House, after a fire.

As the Great Depression began, Sweet Briar received the most applications in its history, which some attributed to its tuition being lower than older and larger women's colleges. However, that required additional dormitory space and scholarships, and ultimately increased fees. Also, 1932 became the only year during her presidency in which the budget ran a (slight) deficit. Glass had been elected to Sweet Briar's Board of Overseers in 1929, and in 1934 also secured alumnae representation on the board. Although the college's debt appeared near retirement by 1932, that took several additional years.

Glass was president of the Association of American Colleges for many years. From 1933 through 1937, she was also president of the American Association of University Women. She achieved international recognition for speaking out against Nazi suppression of intellectual freedom.

In 1940, Sweet Briar received an endowment for the Carter Glass Chair of Government (named after her half-brother, a U.S. Senators who had secured the college's original charter and served on its board), in part through the work of Dabney S. Lancaster, executive secretary to the Board of Overseers, who left to become Virginia's Superintendent of Public Instruction shortly before America entered World War II. Glass also assisted in that war effort, as did many Sweet Briar students. During her tenure she managed to build not only the college's reputation and student body, but also increased its endowment to nearly $1 million by her retirement in 1946.

Glass had announced her pending retirement at age 65 in 1944, but agreed to stay on until her successor was selected. Martha Lucas Pate was inaugurated Sweet Briar's fourth president on November 1, 1946.

=== After Sweet Briar ===
Despite her retirement, she then served on the federal Loyalty Review Board, based in Washington, D.C., and traveled to hearings throughout the country until 1953. She was an active Democrat, and also was an actress in local theater productions in Charlottesville. At age 74, she interrupted her retirement to serve as temporary principal of Stuart Hall School in Staunton, Virginia after Nan Powell Hodges broke her hip and asked for emergency assistance.

== Personal life ==
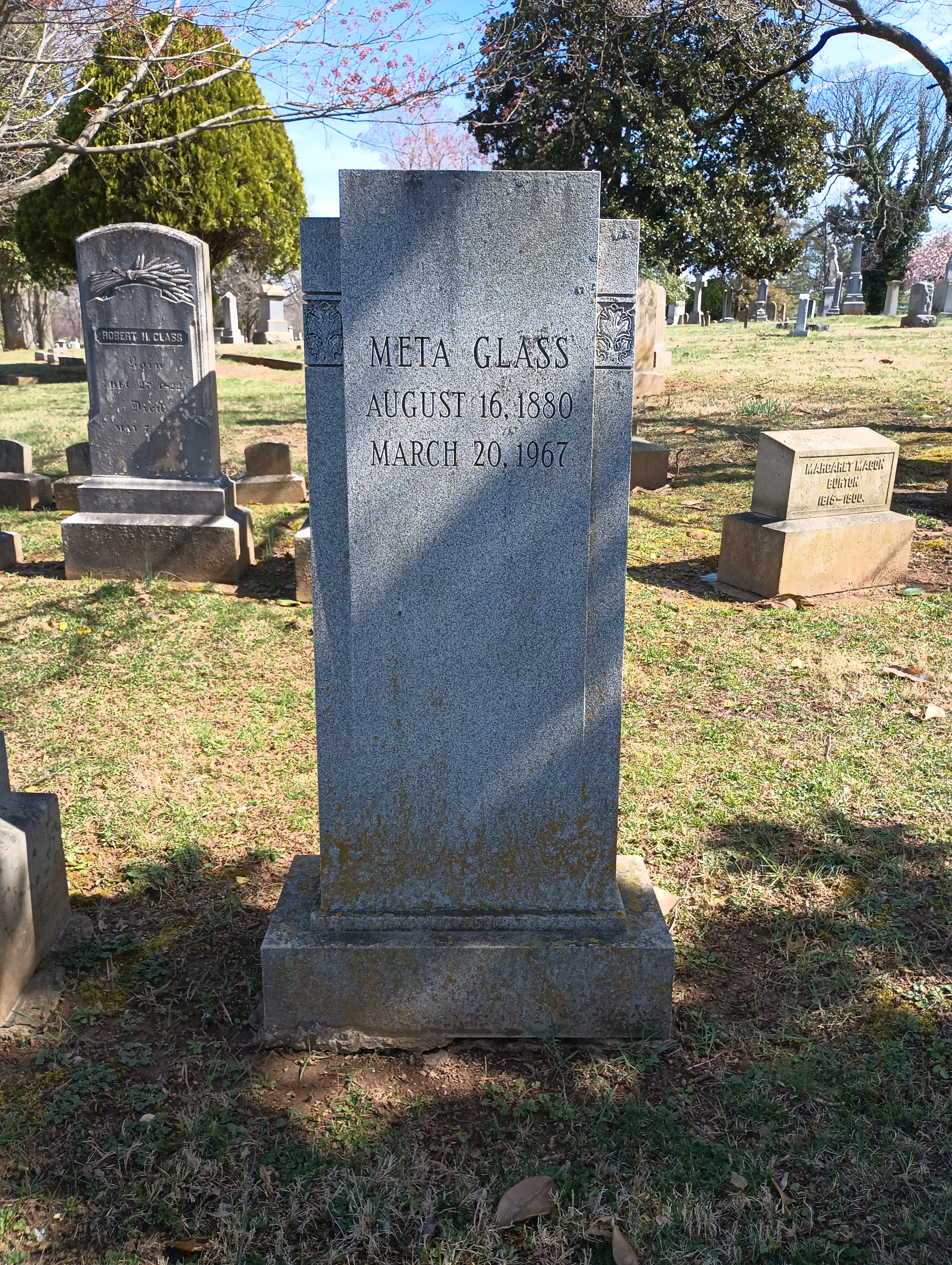
Glass' gravestone at Spring Hill Cemetery, Lynchburg.

Glass spent her final years in a nursing home in Charlottesville, Virginia. In 1967, Glass died in Charlottesville, Virginia at the age of 86. Glass is buried with other family members in Lynchburg's Spring Hill Cemetery.

=== Legacy ===
Sweet Briar College named a building, Meta Glass Residence Hall, in her honor. It is located in Virginia.

== Sources ==
- Stohlman, Martha Lou Lemmon. The Story of Sweet Briar College. Princeton University Press, 1956. pp. 157–197.
