= Mary Harley =

American physician

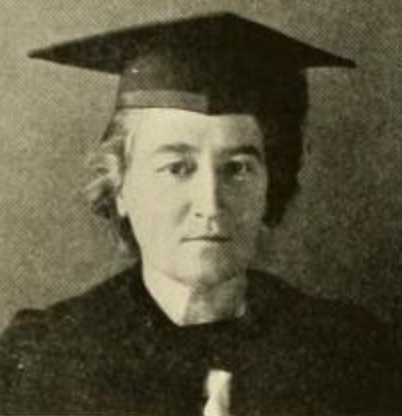
- Mary Harley, from a 1922 yearbook.
- Born: December 20, 1865; Newark, New Jersey
- Died: May 31, 1962 (aged 96); Lynchburg, Virginia
- Occupations: Physician, college professor
- Known for: Taught at Sweet Briar College from 1906 to 1935

Mary Harley (December 20, 1865 – May 31, 1962) was an American physician. She taught physiology and hygiene at Sweet Briar College from 1906 to 1935. The student health center at Sweet Briar is named for her.

== Early life ==
Harley was born in Newark, New Jersey, the daughter of Joseph Harley, an English-born dentist. Harley earned her medical degree at the New York Medical College for Women.

== Career ==
Mary Harley went to Florida as a medical volunteer during the Spanish–American War in 1898. She was on the staff of the Hudson River State Hospital and school physician at Vassar College after medical school. She also spent time as a clinic physician at the Penn School in South Carolina.

For most of her career, Harley was on the faculty of Sweet Briar College, where she was the school physician, and taught physiology and hygiene classes, from the school's first term in 1906 to her retirement in 1935. During the 1918 influenza pandemic, she oversaw the campus quarantine and treated students who became ill. She and Anna S. Thatcher chaperoned a student trip to Iceland, Norway, and Germany in 1922.

Harley was a member of the Medical Society of Virginia. She spoke at an international conference of physicians in New York City in 1919. In 1927, she presented the prize at a "baby contest" for Amherst County.

== Personal life ==
In retirement after 1935, Harley traveled internationally, and studied paleontology for six months at a museum in Pretoria, South Africa. To celebrate her 88th birthday in 1954, Harley donated autographed volumes on paleontology to the Sweet Briar library. Harley died in 1962, aged 96 years, in Lynchburg, Virginia. The Mary Harley Health and Wellness Center at Sweet Briar College is named for her.
