= Irén Marik =

Hungarian musician (1905–1986)

Irén Marik (1905 – 1986) was a classical pianist born in Hungary.

Although she studied with composer Béla Bartók and studied at Budapest's Liszt Academy, she fled Hungary after World War II and moved to the United States, where she taught at Sweet Briar College and eventually moved to the small town of Independence, California, outside of Death Valley, where she lived with author Evelyn Eaton.

She taught piano there and occasionally recorded in studios, but for the most part gave performances in her desert home for her neighbors and friends. Irén Marik died in 1986.
