= Adeline Ames =

American mycologist (1879-1976)

Adeline Sarah Ames
- Born: October 6, 1879; Henderson, Nebraska, U.S.
- Died: February 11, 1976 (aged 96); Long Beach, California, U.S.
- Resting place: Wyuka Cemetery, Lincoln, Nebraska
- Education: University of Nebraska (B.S., A.M.); Cornell University (Ph.D.)
- Scientific career
- Fields: Botany, Mycology
- Workplaces: Department of Plant Industry, Assistant Forest Pathologist, Washington, D.C., 1913; Sweet Briar College, Professor of Biology, 1920–1941
- Author abbrev. (botany): A.Ames

Adeline Sarah Ames (October 6, 1879 – February 11, 1976) was an American mycologist who specialized in the study of mycelium.

== Biography ==
Born October 6, 1879, in Henderson, York County, Nebraska, Ames was the eldest of four children of Elwyn Ames and Hettie Owen Ames. She attended the University of Nebraska, (B.A., A.M., 1903) and received her Ph.D. from Cornell University in 1913. She died in Long Beach, California, on February 11, 1976.

== Career ==
In 1913, Ames served as Assistant Forest Pathologist in the Department of Plant Industry in Washington, D.C. In 1918, she also worked with George Francis Atkinson in Tacoma, Washington collecting fleshy fungus flora. From 1920 to 1941, she was a biology professor at Sweet Briar College.

== Scientific work ==
In February 1913, while a graduate student at Cornell University, she studied the collection of Polyporaceae at the New York Botanical Garden, with special reference to the species occurring in the United States. In 1913, she published the article "A New Wood-Destroying Fungus" in the Botanical Gazette where she worked with Atkinson in Cornell examining polypores collected in the engineering building at the Alabama Polytechnic Institute growing on woodwork. The fungus was identified as a new species, Poria atrosporia, mycelium with pale umbrinous coloration within the substratum or in a superficial layer found on wood from conifers.

== Partial bibliography ==
- The Temperature Relations of Some Fungi Causing Storage Rots (1915). Phytopathology 5:1 (11-19).
- A Consideration of Structure in Relation to Genera of Polyporaceae (1913). key and descriptions of sixteen genera.
- A New Wood-Destroying Fungus (1913). Botanical Gazette, Volume 5 (397-399).
- Studies in the Polyporaceae (1913, Ph.D. dissertation, Cornell University).
- Studies on the structure and behavior of rosettes (1903, A.M. thesis, University of Nebraska). ETD collection for University of Nebraska - Lincoln.
