= Emilie Watts McVea =

American college president (1867–1928)

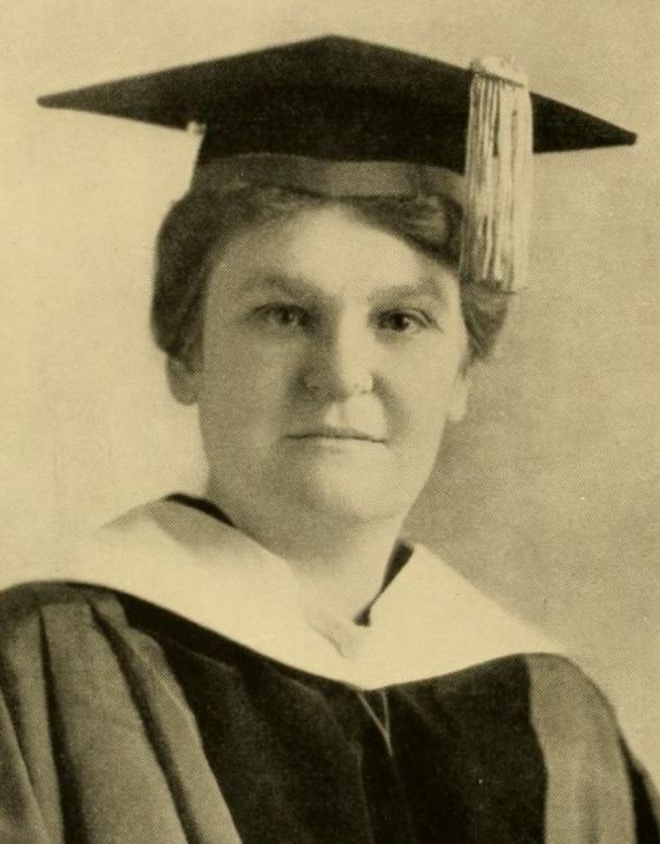
- Emilie Watts McVea, from a 1922 yearbook

2nd President of Sweet Briar College
- In office 1916–1925
- Preceded by: Mary Kendrick Benedict
- Succeeded by: Meta Glass

Personal details
- Born: February 17, 1867 Clinton, Louisiana, U.S.
- Died: July 26, 1928 (aged 61) Cincinnati, Ohio, U.S.
- Profession: Educator, administrator

Emilie Watts McVea (February 17, 1867 – July 26, 1928) was an American college administrator, dean of women at the University of Cincinnati from 1909 to 1916, and president of Sweet Briar College from 1916 to 1925.

== Early life ==
Emilie Watts McVea was born in Clinton, Louisiana, one of the four daughters of Charles McVea and Emilie Rose Watts McVea. Her father, a judge, died in 1876, and she moved with her widowed mother and sisters to Raleigh, North Carolina to be closer to family. Her uncle, John Esten Cooke Smedes, was the second president of St. Augustine's College in Raleigh. She attended St. Mary's School in Raleigh, graduating in 1884. She earned a bachelor's degree in 1902, and a master's degree in 1903, both from George Washington University.

== Career ==
McVea taught at her alma mater, St. Mary's School in Raleigh, and in 1898 became the school's "lady principal". After a break to attend college in Washington, D.C., she taught English literature at the University of Tennessee and at the University of Cincinnati; at the latter school she was also dean of women from 1909 to 1916.

McVea was the second president of Sweet Briar College, in office from 1916 to 1925. Her tenure saw the school expand and improve in endowment, campus facilities, and reputation. After she retired from the presidency for health reasons in 1925, succeeded by Meta Glass, she taught English at Rollins College in Florida.

She was a co-founder of the Southern Association of College Women from 1903 to 1904, chaired the Education committee of the Ohio Federation of Women's Clubs in 1916, led the Cincinnati Woman's Club, and was active in the women's suffrage movement and the YWCA. During World War I, she toured as a lecturer supporting the YMCA and wartime food programs. She wrote biographical articles for the Encyclopedia Americana (1920), and two monographs, Equal Franchise in Ohio and Suggestions for Teaching Literature in the Grades.

McVea was presented with two honorary doctorates, from the University of Cincinnati in 1916 and from the University of North Carolina in 1921.

== Personal life ==
McVea died in Cincinnati, Ohio in 1928, aged 61 years. Her grave is in Raleigh's Historic Oakwood Cemetery. Sweet Briar College honors the highest-ranking student in each class as an Emilie Watts McVea Scholar.
