= Do Ngak Kunphen Ling Tibetan Buddhist Center for Universal Peace =

Do Ngak Kunphen Ling Tibetan Buddhist Center for Universal Peace (མདོ་སྔགས་ཀུན་ཕན་གླིང་།) (DNKL) is a Tibetan Buddhist retreat center located in Redding, Connecticut. It offers classes and meditation retreats in the Gelug spiritual tradition of the 14th Dalai Lama under the guidance of Gyumed Khensur Rinpoche Lobsang Jampa.

== Activities ==
Under the guidance of Gyumed Khensur Rinpoche Lobsang Jampa, DNKL draws on the spiritual tradition of the 14th Dalai Lama and the humanitarian visions of Maurice Pate. It acts as a Tibetan Buddhist monastery, and a learning center for students residing in the United States and abroad.

On a regular basis resident and visiting lamas conduct classes on the topics of Buddhist philosophy, moral discipline, meditative concentration, and transformation wisdom. These classes are open to people of all religious traditions and to people with no particular religious affiliation. Students take part in short and long-term group retreats, and many conduct their own solitary meditative retreats on the grounds. DNKL also hosts public talks, spiritual festivals, and other community events. One of the locally better known events is the annual animal blessing, usually held during the summer months.

DNKL engages in humanitarian activities locally and globally, such as assisting Tibetan Buddhist monks and nuns, disaster relief, and aiding children with basic education and health needs.

== History ==
The grounds of DNKL were once part of the estate of John Read, after whom the town of Redding was named. The grounds later served as the residence of Maurice Pate, founding director of UNICEF, and his wife, Martha Lucas Pate, a scholar of religion and philosophy, and president of Sweet Briar College. After their death, Pate's organization, the Maurice Pate Institute for Human Survival, donated the 100-acre (40.5 ha) property to the Mahayana Sutra and Tantra Center of Connecticut. It was initially established in 1997 as the Godstow Retreat Center by Geshe Michael Roach, with whom it is no longer affiliated due to the behavior of Roach. When Gyumed Khensur Rinpoche Lobsang Jampa came to the center as Spiritual Director in 2006, the name was changed to Do Ngak Kunphen Ling, which roughly translated from Tibetan means Tibetan Buddhist Center for Universal Peace.

The center has become notable enough to warrant a visit by the 14th Dalai Lama to the area.
