= John Gregory Brown =

American novelist and academic

- Born: July 31, 1960
- Occupation: novelist

John Gregory Brown (born July 31, 1960) is an American novelist and professor of English at Sweet Briar College.

== Background and education ==
Brown was born on July 31, 1960, in New Orleans, Louisiana. He received his B.A. from Tulane University in 1982, and his M.A. from Johns Hopkins University in 1988. He is Director of Creative Writing and the Julia Jackson Nichols Professor of English at Sweet Briar College in Virginia, where he lives with his wife, fellow novelist Carrie Brown, and their two dogs, Murphy Brown and James Brown. After spending the 2015-2016 academic year teaching at Deerfield Academy, he returned to Sweet Briar College.

== Work ==
Brown's first novel, Decorations in a Ruined Cemetery (1994), received broad critical acclaim. In The New York Times, Margo Jefferson praised the book's "seductive rhythmic murmur". In The Los Angeles Times, Charles Solomon noted the writer's "great sensitivity.". Reviewing the book for the Chicago Tribune, Charles Larson called the book a "triumph...much of its magnificence is the result of the author's decision to create imaginative voices other than his own," concluding "John Gregory Brown is both the beneficiary of and a worthy successor to our finest Southern writers." The novel received both the 1994 Lillian Smith Book Award and the United Kingdom's 1996 Steinbeck Award, for the year's best novel by a writer under forty years of age.

The Wrecked, Blessed Body of Shelton Lafleur, Brown's second book, was published in 1996. The Los Angeles Times called the novel "John Gregory Brown's gift of grace to us," and The Dallas Morning News wrote," John Gregory Brown is a strong new voice in American—not just Southern—fiction, and his work deserves the widest possible audience.

Reviewing Brown's third novel, Audubon's Watch (2002), in The New York Times, novelist Stewart O'Nan praised Brown's "ambition and achievement," concluding, "This is a brazen performance that few authors would have the skill or the courage to risk." The novel received the 2002 Louisiana Endowment for The Humanities Award. His latest book, A Thousand Miles from Nowhere, was released in June 2016.

== Honors ==
- 2002 Louisiana Endowment for The Humanities 2002 Book of the Year for Audubon’s Watch.
- 1998 George A. And Eliza Gardner Howard Foundation Fellowship.
- 1996 Steinbeck Award for Decorations in a Ruined Cemetery, U.K. (Awarded for the year's best novel published in the United Kingdom by a writer under forty years old.).
- 1996 Granta magazine Best Young American Novelists competition, Southern Region.
- 1994 The Lillian Smith Book Award for Decorations in a Ruined Cemetery.
- 1993 Lyndhurst Fellowship.
