= Washington Conservation Guild =

- Established: 1967
- Type: Professional conservation association
- Region served: Washington Metropolitan Area
- Website: washingtonconservationguild.org

The Washington Conservation Guild (WCG) is a non-profit organization of conservation and cultural heritage professionals. The WCG serves as a resource for learning about the care of cultural heritage collections.

== History ==
The Washington Conservation Guild (WCG) is a 501(c)(3) nonprofit organization established in 1967 for professional conservators, students, museum professionals, and members of the public interested in the preservation of art and historic materials.

The idea for the regional conservation group was proposed as early as 1965, when the International Council of Museums (ICOM) Committee for Conservation met in Washington, DC. The first steering committee met informally in the summer of 1967; here, it was decided that the primary intentions of the group was to provide a public forum where members could meet and "sponsor presentations to promote the exchange of ideas among conservators in all fields in the Washington area."

== Bylaws ==
Bylaws are put forward by the WCG to define its governance and scope.

== Organization & Governance ==
Based in Washington, D.C., the WCG draws its members primarily from Washington, Maryland, and northern Virginia. Members include both professional conservators and non-conservators - from government, state, and private museums; as well as studios, laboratories, and other cultural or academic organizations. There are no restrictions on who may apply for membership.

The Washington Conservation Guild is governed by all-volunteer, membership-elected Board of Directors. The Board is composed of five officers and several directors. The WCG is also composed of several committees, led by Board-appointed chairs.

Elections for WCG Board Officers and Directors take place in May at the annual business meeting.

== Projects ==
=== Events ===
The WCG holds meetings from September through May each year, generally on the first Thursday of each month. Once annually, the Guild hosts the 3-Ring Circus event. The '3-Ring Circus' held January 9, 2014 in partnership with the National Museum of African Art, ran with three consecutive sessions. The themes for the January 2014 3-Ring Circus were "Conservation in Far Flung Places," "Analytical" and "Contemporary."

The Guild also holds several membership events throughout the year. These events have included lectures, workshops, and networking sessions.

=== Community Partnership Project ===
The Community Partnership Project (formerly the Angels Project) is designed to "promote a broader understanding of the importance of cultural preservation while providing meaningful assistance to important local collections." Members participating in the projects work pro-bono, volunteering their time and conservation expertise at a particular historic site in the broad DC area. This program originally began in 1988 with the WCG's parent group, the American Institute of Conservation, pairing conservators with collections that need care.

=== Fire at the Georgetown Public Library ===
On April 30, 2007, a three-alarm fire caused significant damage to the Georgetown branch of the DC Public Library. City officials estimated the cost to repair the library at about $20 million; the renovation included the restoration of exterior doors and windows, stone masonry, and ornamental railings and grates. Members of the WCG responded and coordinated with the DC library officials to set up disaster recovery efforts. At its annual meeting days later on May 3, 2007, the WCG held a fundraiser raffle. The proceeds went to support the conservation of the library's artwork, manuscripts, maps, and documents damaged in the fire.

== Publications ==
The Washington Conservation Guild published a quarterly newsletter written and edited by volunteers to benefit guild members. Offered at first only as a printed edition, the newsletter transitioned to an online PDF. The newsletter was published as a PDF until December 2012, when it was replaced by a continuously updated blog-style website. Archived newsletters can be found on the WCG website. Later, social media including Twitter, Instagram, and Facebook streams were added to further distribute announcements and regional employment opportunities.

In 2004, the Washington Conservation Guild published the second edition of its eBook, Conservation Resources for Art and Antiques. Conservation Resources is a guide describing how to care for and preserve fine art, antiques, family heirlooms, memorabilia, and personal collections.

== See also ==
- Art conservation and restoration
- Collections care
- Conservation Associations and Professional Organizations
- Conservation-restoration
