= Michael Fletcher =

Michael or Mike Fletcher may refer to:

- Michael Fletcher (gridiron football), American player of Canadian football
- Michael R. Fletcher, Canadian speculative fiction author
- Michael Scott Fletcher, Australian Methodist minister
- Mike Fletcher (rugby league), English rugby league player
- Mike Fletcher (musician), British woodwind multi-instrumentalist
