= Marshalyn Yeargin-Allsopp =

American epidemiologist

- Education: Sweet Briar College, Emory University
- Known for: Epidemiology of autism
- Awards: Arnold J. Capute Award (AAP)
- Scientific career
- Fields: Epidemiology
- Workplaces: Centers for Disease Control and Prevention

Marshalyn Yeargin-Allsopp is a medical epidemiologist and chief of the developmental disabilities branch at the Centers for Disease Control and Prevention, where she has worked since 1981. She is also an adjunct assistant professor of pediatrics at Emory University. She is the great-niece of Benjamin Mays, former president of Morehouse College.

== Education ==
Yeargin-Allsopp was the first African-American student to attend and graduate from Sweet Briar College; she entered the school in 1966, and graduated in 1968. She received her M.D. from Emory University in 1972, where she was the first black woman to enroll in the medical school, and completed her residency in preventive medicine in 1984. She also completed a fellowship in developmental pediatrics at Albert Einstein College of Medicine, where she was affiliated from 1975 to 1981, as well as a pediatric internship and residency at Montefiore Medical Center. She is board-certified in pediatrics and in developmental disabilities.

== Career ==
Yeargin-Allsopp is the chief of the developmental disabilities branch of the National Center on Birth Defects and Developmental Disabilities at the Centers for Disease Control and Prevention (CDC). She has worked with the CDC since 1981.

Yeargin-Allsopp is also a former member of Autism Speaks' scientific advisory board and scientific affairs committee. In addition, she is the chair of the Interagency Coordinating Committee for the National Children's Study. In 2008, the American Academy of Pediatrics gave Yeargin-Allsopp the Arnold J. Capute Award for her work in the field of children's disabilities.

== Research ==
Yeargin-Allsopp's research focuses mainly on the epidemiology of autism and other developmental disabilities such as cerebral palsy, especially in urban areas. She was the first to develop a population-based surveillance system to measure the prevalence of such disabilities among school-age children. In 2003, she published results which identified 987 confirmed cases of autism among a group of three- to ten-year-old children in Atlanta, resulting in a prevalence of 34 cases per 10,000. This rate is much higher than traditional estimates of the disorder, but one textbook still characterizes it as likely underestimating the issue.
