= Sweet Briar College =

American private women's college in Amherst County, Virginia, US

- Motto: Rosam quae meruit ferat (Latin)
- Motto in English: "She who has earned the rose may bear it"
- Type: Private women's liberal arts college
- Established: 1901; 125 years ago
- Endowment: $73.9 million (2017)
- President: Mary Pope M. Hutson
- Faculty: 74 (fall 2022)
- Students: 460 (fall 2022)
- Location: Amherst County, Virginia, U.S.
- Campus: Rural, historic, 2,840 acres (1,150 ha)
- Colors: Pink and green
- Nickname: Vixens
- Sporting affiliations: NCAA Division III, ODAC
- Website: sbc.edu
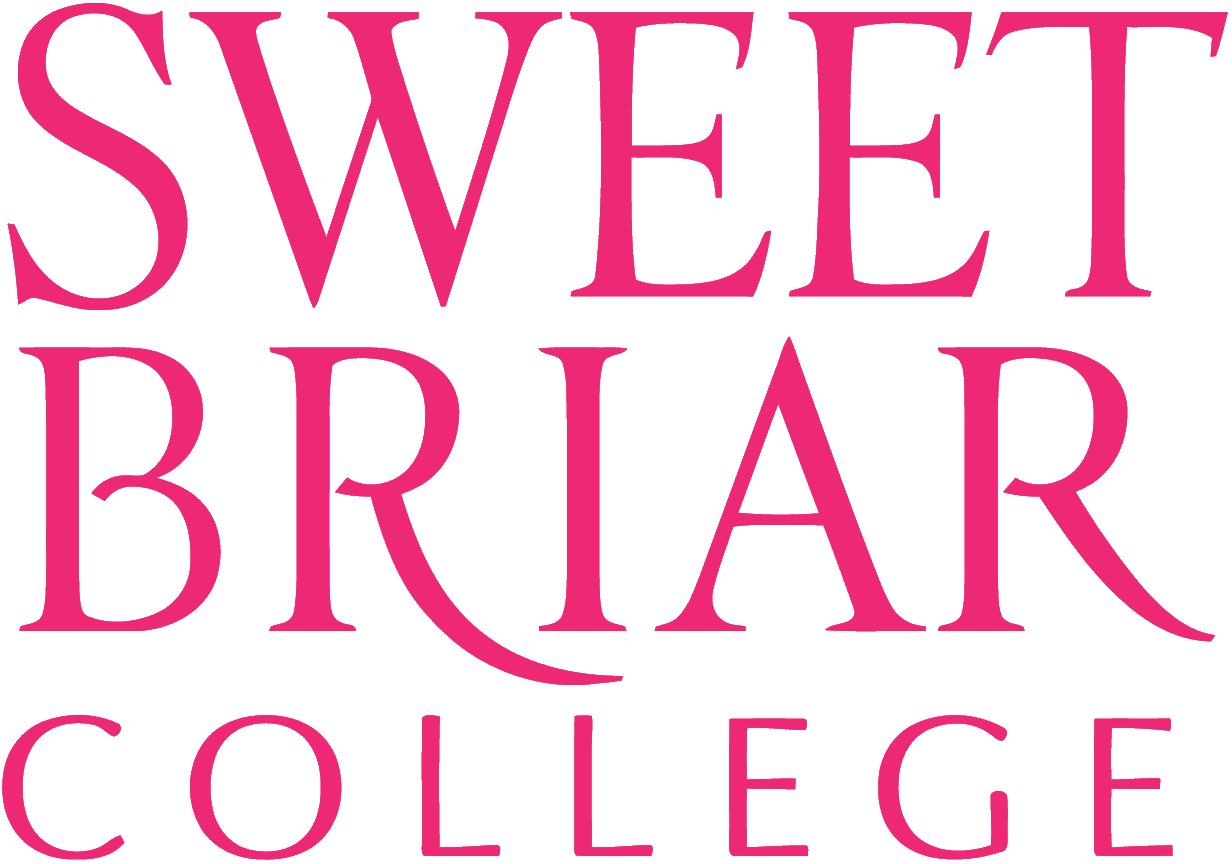

Sweet Briar College (Sweet Briar or SBC) is a private women's liberal arts college in Sweet Briar, Amherst County, Virginia, United States. It was established in 1901 by Indiana Fletcher Williams in memory of her deceased daughter, Daisy, and began holding classes in 1906. Sweet Briar is known for its campus with its historic Georgian Revival architecture by Ralph Adams Cram and its 3,250 acres (13.2 km^{2}) of hills, forests, and fields.

== History ==
=== Sweet Briar plantation ===
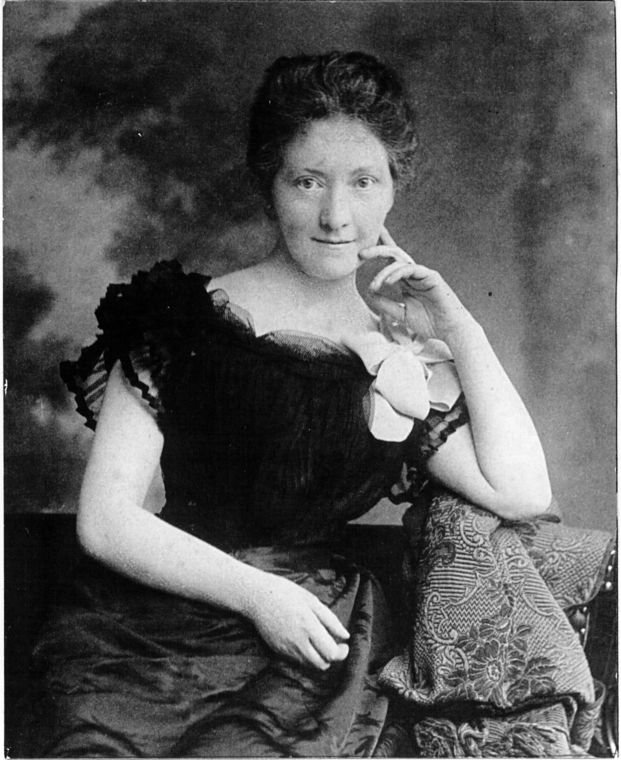
Indiana Fletcher Williams (1828–1900), founder of Sweet Briar College

The college is named after the former plantation of Elijah Fletcher and his descendants. Fletcher was a 19th-century teacher, businessman and mayor of Lynchburg, Virginia. He married Maria Antoinette Crawford in 1813 and purchased the Sweet Briar property from her aunt and uncle, using slave labor to run both the plantation and his household. The plantation was initially known as Locust Ridge; Crawford supposedly renamed it "Sweet Briar" after the roses which grew on the land. Their daughter, Indiana Fletcher, was born in 1828 in Lynchburg.

Indiana attended the Georgetown Visitation Preparatory School, Doane Academy, and later toured Europe with her brother and sister. She met James Henry Williams, a student at Union Theological Seminary in 1858, and after reuniting in Virginia following the American Civil War, they were married in 1865.

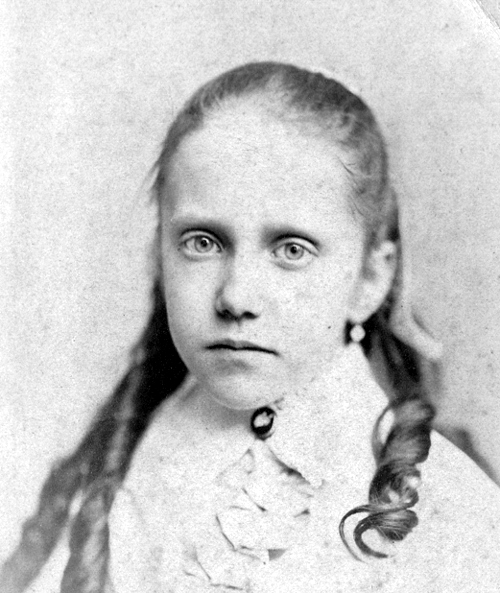
Daisy Williams, Indiana's daughter

Their daughter, Maria Georgiana "Daisy" Williams, was born in 1867. At Elijah Fletcher's death, Indiana inherited the plantation. James Williams gave up his initial career as a clergyman to maintain the property. Daisy Williams died at the age of 16 in 1884. Both James and Indiana Fletcher-Williams were devastated at her death, and James expressed a wish in his own will that a school might be established in honor of Daisy. William died in 1889, leaving his entire estate to his wife, and Indiana's brother Sidney also gave her additional property upon his death in 1898. When Indiana died in 1900, she bequeathed Sweet Briar plantation to become a school for young women.

By his death in 1858, Elijah Fletcher enslaved over 110 people. After the emancipation in 1865, several formerly enslaved people and descendants of enslaved people continued to work for pay and live at Sweet Briar, including Martha Penn Taylor, who worked for three generations of the Fletcher-Williams family, and Signora Hollins (who was Indiana Fletcher's childhood playmate). Some descendants of the people enslaved by the family still work at the college, and others hold family reunions on campus.

=== Indiana Fletcher Williams' bequest and official opening ===
In 1901, with the assistance of then Virginia state senator Carter Glass, the Virginia General Assembly issued a charter to Sweet Briar Institute as indicated in the will of Indiana Fletcher Williams. The will stated that the land of Sweet Briar plantation must be used as a "school or seminary to be known as the "Sweet Briar institute," for the education of white girls and young women. It shall be the general scope and object of the school to impart to its students such education in sound learning, and such physical, moral and religious training as shall, in the judgment of the directors, best fit them to be useful members of society".

In 1906, Sweet Briar College officially opened with 51 students and granted its first AB degrees in 1910. In 1932, Sweet Briar's study abroad exchange program with the University of St. Andrews, Scotland, was established. In 1948, the Junior Year in France (JYF) program was launched, followed by other study abroad programs.

=== Civil Rights era changes ===
Legal action to alter Indiana Fletcher Williams' will was required to admit African-American students, as it had limited the purpose of the college to the education of solely white women. On August 17, 1964, wishing to eliminate "white" from the charter and comply with the Civil Rights Act of 1964, Sweet Briar filed a bill of complaint with the Amherst County Circuit Court. The request was initially denied at the state level, with the Commonwealth's Attorney General stating that the will was "plain, unambiguous, conclusive, and binding".

After several years of unsuccessful state litigation, the college filed a complaint with the federal United States District Court for the Western District of Virginia. On April 25, 1966, Judge Thomas J. Michie issued a temporary restraining order that prevented enforcement of the racial restriction. On July 17, 1967, a three-judge Charlottesville court confirmed permanence of the restraining order. The first African-American student, Marshalyn Yeargin-Allsopp, was admitted to the college in September 1966.

=== Distinguishing features and early decades ===
Sweet Briar long held a robust academic reputation. During its first decade, Sweet Briar ran a "sub-college" department to prepare students for college-level work. The original board of trustees appointed in Williams' will maintained that the college would be the academic equivalent of Smith, Wellesley and Mount Holyoke. The difference in Sweet Briar's curriculum was the inclusion of "hands-on" or "practical" courses, as well as physical education, in accordance with Williams' directive that the school produce "useful members of society". This forward-thinking approach evolved into the college's core mission, where students have direct access to their disciplines while gaining real-world and classroom learning experience. During the first few years of the college, this concept quickly gave way to a more traditional liberal arts curriculum.

=== 2015 closure attempt ===
==== Pending closure announced by board ====
On March 3, 2015, the college's board of directors, following a unanimous vote on February 28, 2015, announced the college would close on August 25, 2015, due to "insurmountable financial challenges". They cited declining enrollment and an endowment insufficient to cover potentially large-scale changes needed to boost enrollment, like coeducation. Another possible factor presented by the board was a declining interest in the traditional women's college model. Sweet Briar had explored merging with other stronger institutions including the University of Virginia, but nothing came of it.

The board announced that academic activity was to cease on August 25, 2015, the college's pending closing date. Some professors said they received termination notices stating their last day of work would be May 30, 2015; the last day of employment for most was June 30, 2015.

Between 2011 and March 2015, Sweet Briar's endowment had dropped from $96.2 to $84 million, as the college drew on endowment for operating expenses. Most of the college's endowment is restricted, meaning the money must serve designated purposes, such as scholarships or faculty chairs. According to Standard & Poor's (S&P), which rates the college's bond debt, only $19 million was unrestricted, $18 million temporarily restricted, and $53 million permanently restricted. Sweet Briar is burdened with about $25 million in debt owed primarily to bondholders, and the college faced the possibility of default and an accelerated lump-sum payment of the entire amount.

College Board representatives explained that with insolvency inevitable—even though the college was still technically solvent—the Board felt the responsible course was an advance announcement of the closing. That would let enrolled students transfer at the beginning of a new academic year and prevent an entering first-year class from having to transfer after only one semester. It would also allow the college to honor financial obligations and provide severance to faculty and staff.

==== Efforts to forestall closing ====
A group of Sweet Briar alumnae, students, faculty, and supporters united to save the college from closing through legal action, social media and a fundraising campaign, "Saving Sweet Briar". Saving Sweet Briar, Inc. asserted that the financial decline cited as the reason for closing was overstated or illusory, and sought the resignation of interim President James F. Jones and the board of directors. In a return statement, the President and the Board declined resignation, saying that doing so would "further destabilize an already fragile situation", and that allegations against them were "wrong and unfair".

A majority of Sweet Briar faculty members passed a resolution opposing the Board's decision to close the college and subsequently issued a vote of no confidence in the school's Board and its president. Over 50 tenured and untenured Sweet Briar faculty members later joined a lawsuit against the college, seeking $42 million in damages, reinstatement of employment, and injunctions to prevent the closure of the college and termination of its faculty.

On March 30, 2015, the Amherst County attorney filed a separate lawsuit, this one on behalf of the Commonwealth of Virginia, seeking an injunction to block the closing of Sweet Briar College and to force the removal and replacement of the president and board of directors. Following an amicus curiae brief released by Virginia Attorney General Mark Herring, who argued that the Amherst County Attorney did not have the standing to seek an injunction, a Bedford County judge ruled that the county attorney had standing to sue under Virginia's charitable solicitation law, but not under its trust law. At a hearing on the Amherst County Attorney's lawsuit on April 15, 2015, the judge granted a 60-day injunction to prevent the college from shifting endowment money solicited for its continued operation to its closing. The judge did not halt the closing, remove the president and board, require the college to continue operations, or appoint a special fiduciary to review college finances. The college's attorney said the college would continue the process of closing, using unrestricted funds.

On April 20, following the decision on the injunction, a group of Sweet Briar students, parents, and alumnae filed a third lawsuit calling the Board decision to close the school a breach of contract. Rather than monetary damages, the suit requested injunctions to prevent the college from taking more steps to shut down or sell assets, and a permanent injunction requiring Sweet Briar to continue operating. The college's spokeswoman contested the allegations. After a hearing on April 29, the same Bedford County judge ruled that the college could not sell any of its assets for six months, although he still did not enjoin the closing.

The college embarked on negotiations to transfer some time-sensitive assets despite the court's injunction. The parties negotiated an agreement to transfer hazardous chemicals, to sell to faculty their personal computers, and to keep Sweet Briar's study abroad program functioning. In adopting the agreed order, the judge declined to allow the transfer of the college's horses. On his own, he added to the injunction for the first time a restriction that the college shall "engage in no such act during the period of this injunction that has as its goals facilitating the closing of the college unless such act is authorized by further order of this court".

On behalf of the Commonwealth, the Amherst County Attorney filed an appeal of the judge's April 15 decision on trust law applicability with the Virginia Supreme Court. Following a hearing on June 4, the Supreme Court ruled in favor of the Commonwealth on June 9, stating that Virginia trust laws can apply to Sweet Briar, and referred the case back to the Bedford county circuit court judge for consideration of a temporary injunction to halt the closing of the college.

==== Agreement to keep the college open ====
On June 20, 2015, the Virginia Attorney General's office announced a mediation agreement to keep Sweet Briar College open for the 2015–16 academic year. The agreement called for Sweet Briar College president James Jones to resign, as well as at least 13 members of the college's board of directors to allow Saving Sweet Briar to appoint a new majority. Lawyers for Saving Sweet Briar contacted Phillip Stone, the former president of Bridgewater College, to ask him to serve as Sweet Briar's new president. Saving Sweet Briar agreed to contribute $12 million, and the state Attorney General agreed to release restrictions on an additional $16 million of endowment money, to pay for continuing operations. On June 22, 2015, the Bedford County judge approved the agreement, and dismissed the pending lawsuits.

=== Revitalization ===
==== Change of leadership ====
Sweet Briar's board is historically elected annually in the spring, however Saving Sweet Briar and plaintiffs in the litigations appointed an entirely new board in July 2015. In a conference call vote, the new board unanimously installed Phillip Stone as the new president and formally rescinded the previous board's announcement that the school was closing.

Stone announced in newspaper interviews that he did not regard this as an interim or one-year appointment, and that in years to come he intended to increase enrollment beyond Sweet Briar's highest past student count. Stone invited most faculty and staff members to remain in their positions; the settlement included paying six months' severance to any who elected to depart. The settlement required Saving Sweet Briar to deliver $12 million by September 2015 to help cover 2015–16 operating costs. The group met and exceeded its target, providing $12.143 million by September 2. In November 2015 the college finances proved strong enough that the board decided not to draw on the promised $16 million which the court had made available from the endowment, reserving the option to do so later if necessary.

On April 23, 2016, the Board of Directors announced that Stone would be stepping down as the president to allow the Board to appoint a permanent leader. On February 6, 2017, the college announced that Meredith Jung-En Woo would become the 13th president of the college, to be instated on May 15, 2017.

==== Academic re-structuring ====
Under Woo the college announced a radical departure from the traditional academic curriculum at Sweet Briar for the fall 2018 semester, restructuring it to remove historic academic departments and replace them with three "centers": Engineering, Science and Technology in Society; Human and Environmental Sustainability; and Creativity, Design and the Arts. The traditional general education requirements was replaced with a new core curriculum program based around women's leadership.

Semesters changed from a 15-week system to "3-12-12-3"-week semesters, with the three-week terms allowing for focus on opportunities such as intensive classes, study abroad, and research opportunities.

==== Financial status and enrollment ====
In January 2016, the college announced that it had received more than 1000 applications for the 2016–2017 academic year and that it did not plan to touch the $16 million of restricted funds initially planned to be released from the endowment by the attorney general.

In June 2018, the regional accreditor, the Southern Association of Colleges and Schools Commission on Colleges, placed Sweet Briar on "warning" status based on a review of its fiscal-year 2017 finances. The college was required to demonstrate to the accreditor within the subsequent 12 months that its finances were sound and soundly managed, or further action, including revocation of accreditation and loss of federal financial aid, could have followed. In June 2019, the commission lifted the warning status.

==== Admissions policy barring transgender students ====
In August 2024, Sweet Briar's leaders announced that the college would not accept transgender students. The Common Application, which Sweet Briar requires applicants to complete, had recently changed to list four possible genders, something the college's administrators found unacceptable saying that the change "presents a challenge both for students applying for admission and administrators and staff making admissions decisions".

College policy now says students can be admitted "if she confirms that her sex assigned at birth is female and that she consistently lives and identifies as a woman". Before this it just required a birth certificate. Sweet Briar's student government association and other campus groups have used social media to criticize the change. On August 26, 2024, the college's faculty senate approved a resolution in favor of reversing the new policy, writing that transgender students are "precisely the students who benefit from attending an institution that is historically dedicated to gender equity in a world where women were underserved and undervalued". John Gregory Brown, chair of the faculty senate, described the new policy as "morally repugnant".

=== Presidents ===
- Mary K. Benedict (1906–1916)
- Emilie Watts McVea (1916–1925)
- Meta Glass (1925–1946)
- Martha B. Lucas (1946–1950)
- Anne Gary Pannell (1950–1971)
- Harold B. Whiteman Jr. (1971–1983)
- Nenah Elinor Fry (1983–1990)
- Barbara A. Hill (1990–1996)
- Elisabeth Showalter Muhlenfeld (1996–2009)
- Jo Ellen Parker (2009–2014)
- James F. Jones Jr. (interim president, 2014–2015)
- Phillip C. Stone (2015–2017)
- Meredith Jung-En Woo (2017–2023)
- Mary Pope Maybank Hutson (2023–present)

== Academics ==
The college offers 17 majors, 21 minors, 3 preprofessional programs (pre-law, pre-medicine, and pre-veterinary), 2 certificate programs (arts management and equine studies), teacher licensure in 10 areas, and 1 graduate degree (Master of Arts in Teaching).

Sweet Briar offers the Bachelor of Arts, Bachelor of Fine Arts, and Bachelor of Science degrees for undergraduate students. It is the second women's college to offer an ABET-accredited engineering degree.

Sweet Briar has a student/faculty ratio of 9 to 1, with 84% of classes having fewer than 20 students. For 2023, U.S. News & World Report ranked the college tied for No.29 in Most Innovative Schools and tied for No.35 in Top Performers on Social Mobility, both out of 210 national liberal arts colleges.

The college offers several study abroad programs, most with a focus on foreign language, such as its Junior Year in France (JYF) program. Other programs include the Japanese Studies Program at Doshisha Women's College of Liberal Arts, Wake Forest/Southern Atlantic States Association for Asian and African Studies (SASASAAS) Program in China-Beijing, Intercollegiate Center of Classical Studies in Rome, the American School of Classical Studies Summer Program at Athens, the National Security Education Program (NSEP) in multiple countries, and other programs in different locations. With approval, students earn credit for international internships.

Sweet Briar offers several academic fellowships and grants for its existing students, including:

- Sweet Briar College's Honors Program offers fellowships to students to support independent-research projects under the supervision of faculty mentors. Projects may be interdisciplinary and include multiple mentors.
- The Student Research and Creative Endeavors Grants provide up to $500 to offset costs associated with student research or creative projects. Grant applications may be from individual students or teams of students.
- Student Travel Grants from the Honors Program supports academic-related travel during the academic year.
- Several scholarships are available for academic travel, which may be used to attend conferences.

=== Undergraduate admissions ===
In 2026, Sweet Briar accepted 71.7% of undergraduate applicants, with admission standards considered challenging and with those enrolled having an average 3.54 high school GPA. The college does not require submission of standardized test scores but they will be considered if submitted, Sweet Briar being a test optional school. Those enrolled that submitted test scores had an average 1210 SAT score (25% submitting scores) or average 24 ACT score (9% submitting scores). Sweet Briar does not have an application fee; it is free to apply. Applicants are required to submit GPAs, to submit recommendations, and to complete a college preparatory program. Submission of high school class rank is not required, but will be considered if submitted.

=== Rankings ===
Academic rankings

Liberal arts
- U.S. News & World Report: 164 (tie) out of 207

For 2026, Sweet Briar is ranked tied for No. 164 out of 207 National Liberal Arts Colleges by U.S. News & World Report, tied for No. 56 in Best Undergraduate Teaching, tied for No. 78 in Top Performers on Social Mobility, and tied for No.113 out of 292 in Best Undergraduate Engineering Programs where a doctorate is not offered for its ABET-accredited program.

== Architecture ==
- Sweet Briar College Historic District
- U.S. National Register of Historic Places
- U.S. Historic district
- Virginia Landmarks Register
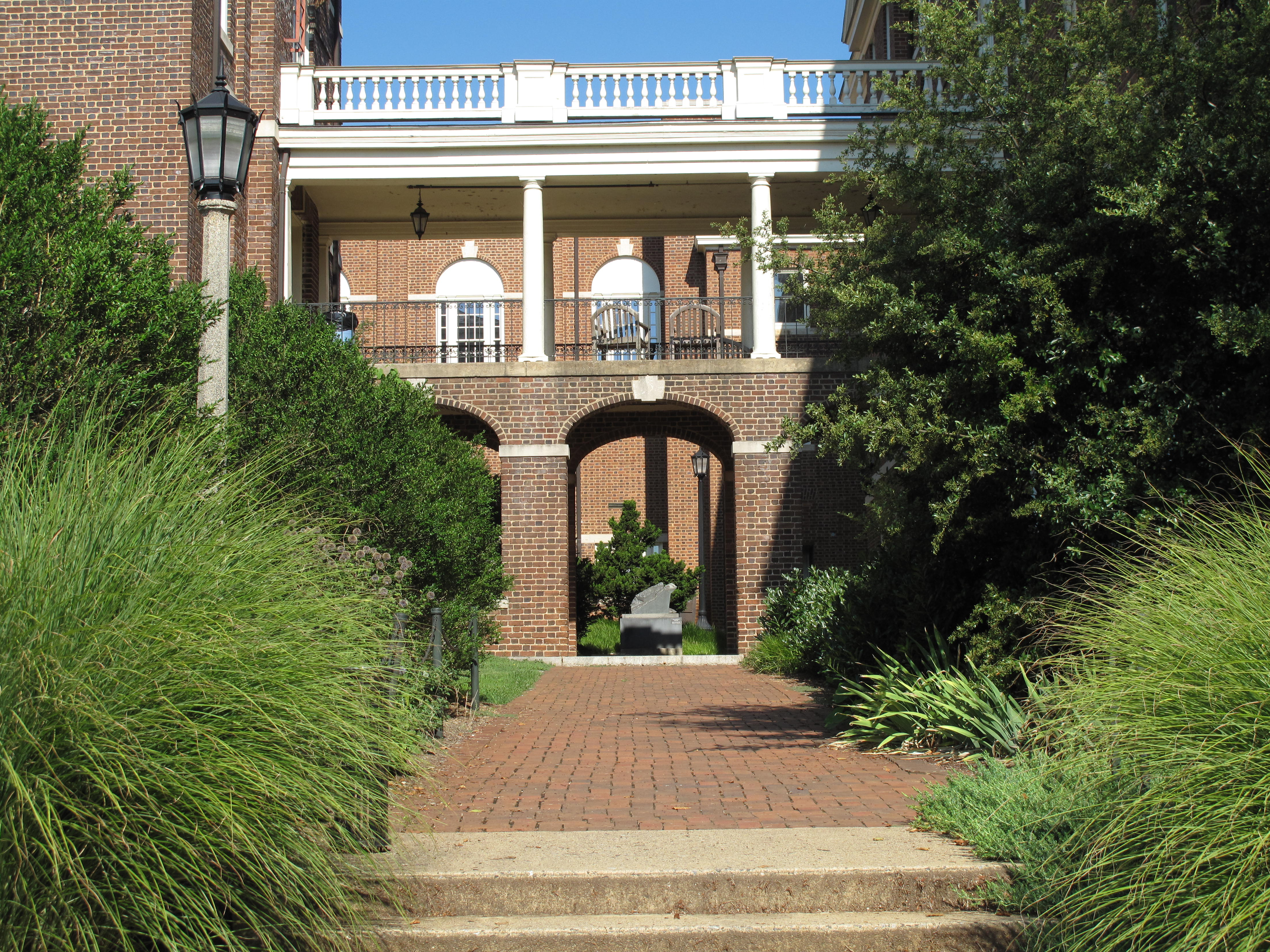
- Arcade between Pannell Art Gallery and Randolph Hall

- Location within Virginia
- Location: Sweet Briar Dr., 0.5 miles west of US 29, Amherst, Virginia
- Coordinates: 37°33′20″N 79°4′50″W
- Area: 27.2 acres (11.0 ha)
- Architect: Ralph Adams Cram; et al.
- Architectural style: Colonial Revival
- NRHP reference No.: 95000240
- VLR No.: 005-0219

Significant dates
- Added to NRHP: March 30, 1995
- Designated VLR: January 15, 1995

The college's architecture is dominated by the work of Ralph Adams Cram, who also lent his architectural expertise to the campuses of Princeton University and West Point, among others. Although Cram's forte was Gothic Revival, he designed Sweet Briar in the Colonial Revival style, using red brick buildings with white balustrades and arcades.

Twenty-one of the thirty campus buildings were designated as the "Sweet Briar College Historic District" by the National Register of Historic Places. Sweet Briar House, which traditionally houses the college president, is among these buildings.

The campus property includes the Sweet Briar plantation burial ground (known as the slave cemetery), where upwards of 60 slaves are buried.

Archaeologists have uncovered many slave artifacts on campus. A slave cabin from the 1840s, which was also used for early college employees, is behind Sweet Briar House.

Many of the college's faculty and staff live on campus, in homes that they rent or privately own. The land these homes are on belongs to the college.

== Campus life ==
Sweet Briar is a residential campus, and nearly all students live on campus. There are seven standard dormitories and additional independent living options for upperclasswomen in the Green Village and Patterson House. The college has over 50 clubs and organizations.

Like other women's colleges in the United States, Sweet Briar College has many traditions. The most prominent is the annual Founder's Day, when students, faculty and staff walk to Monument Hill to place daisies at Daisy Williams's grave site and memorial.

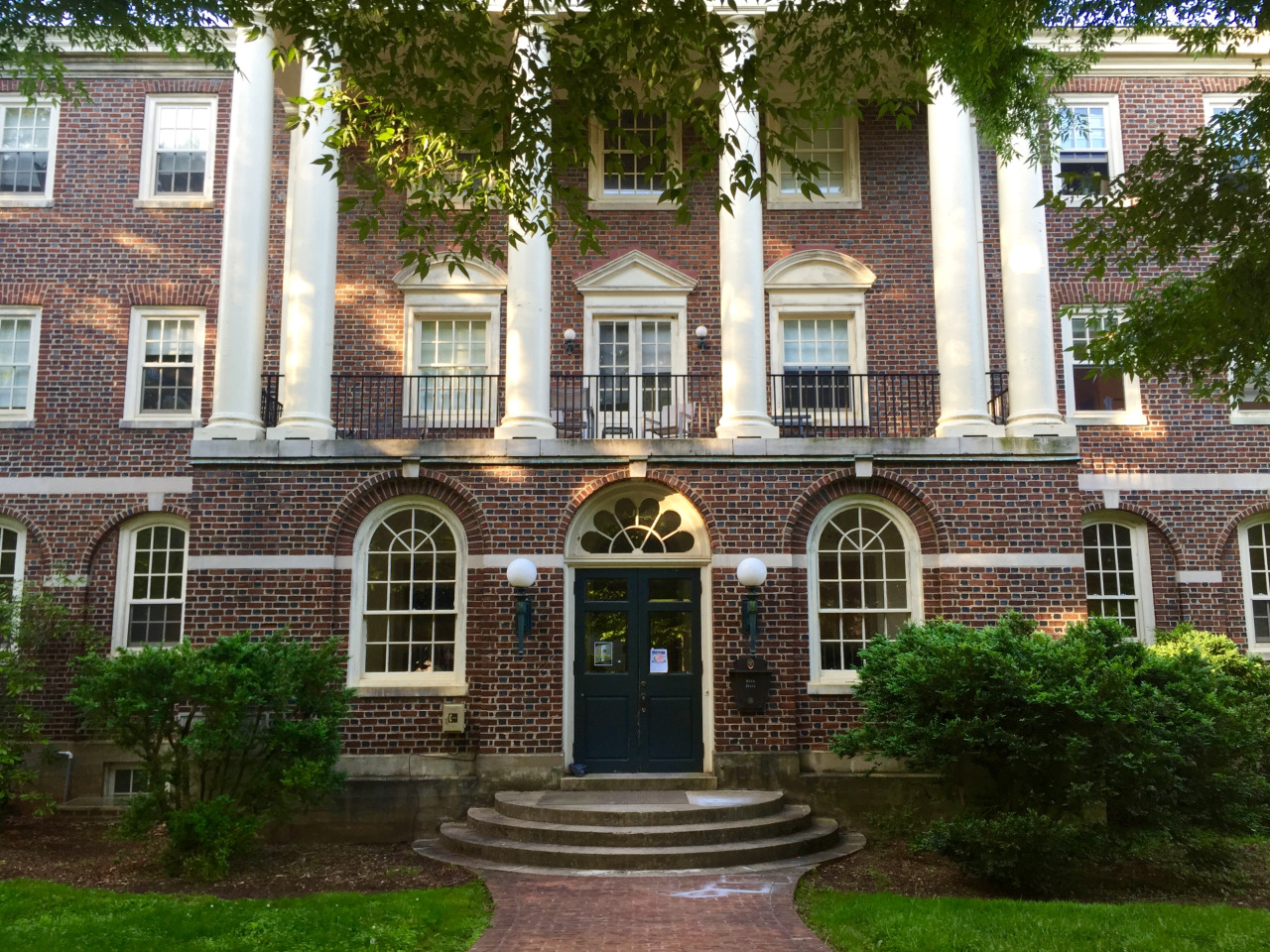
Reid Hall, a dormitory on campus

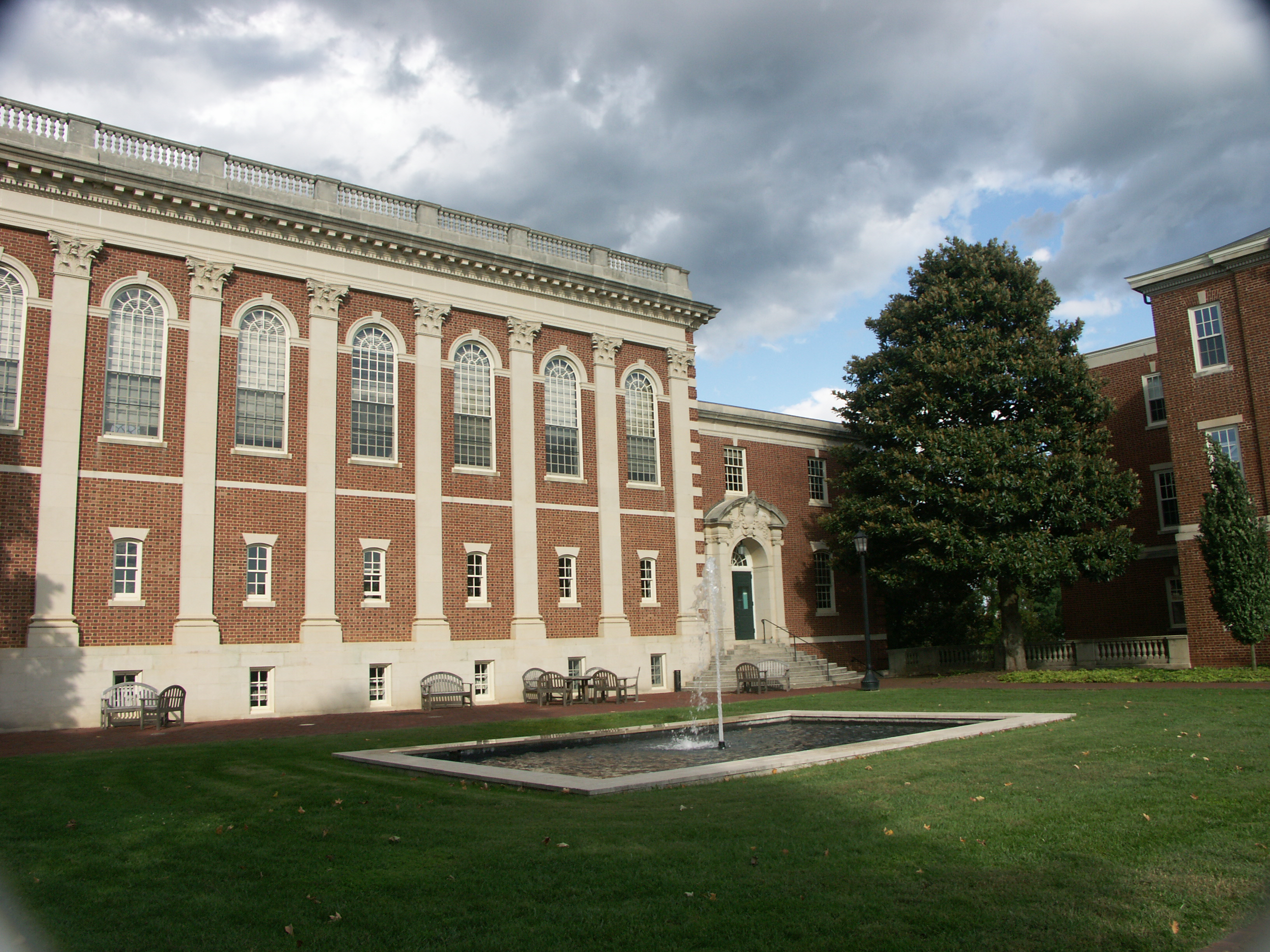
Benedict Hall

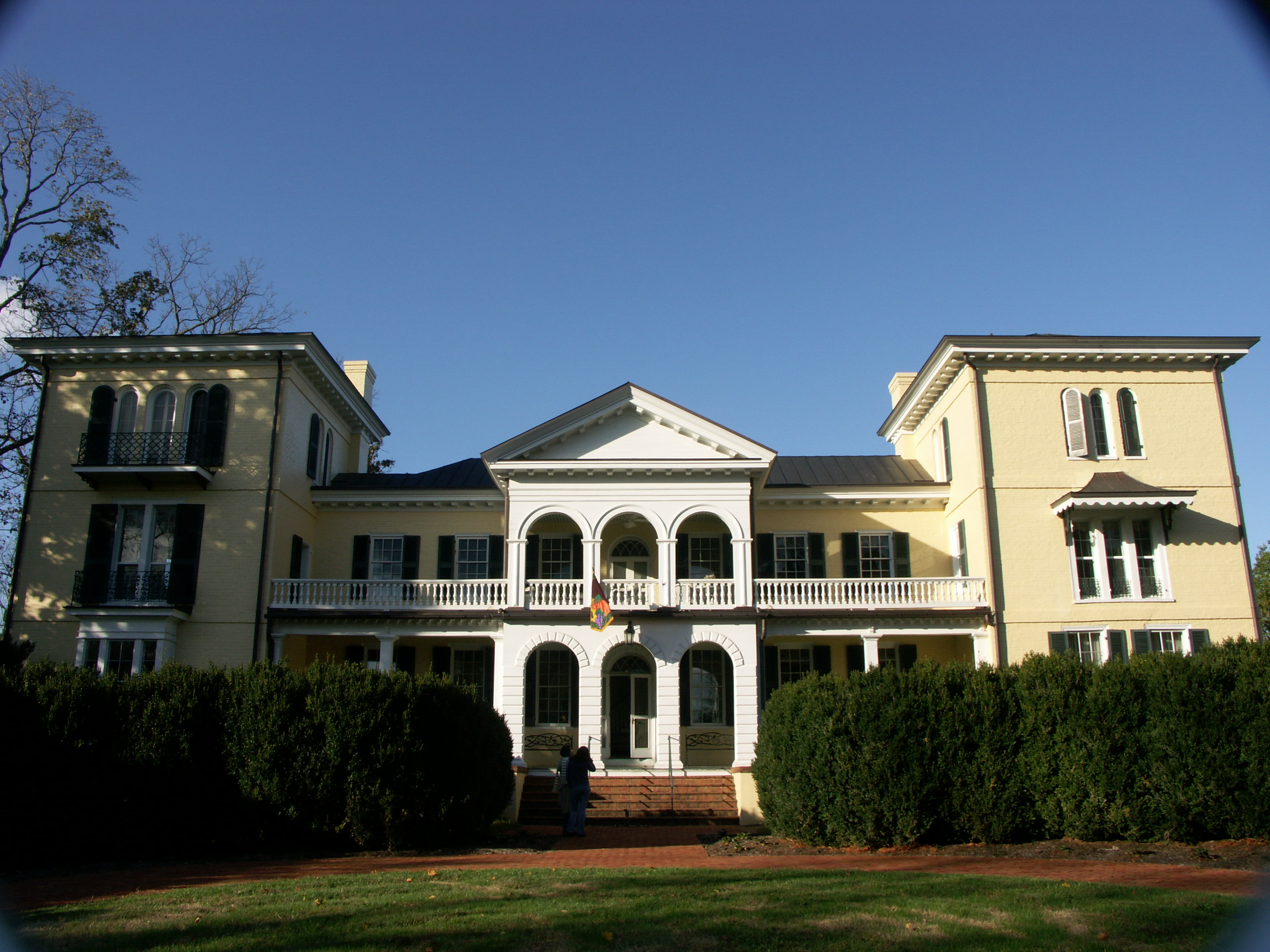
Residence

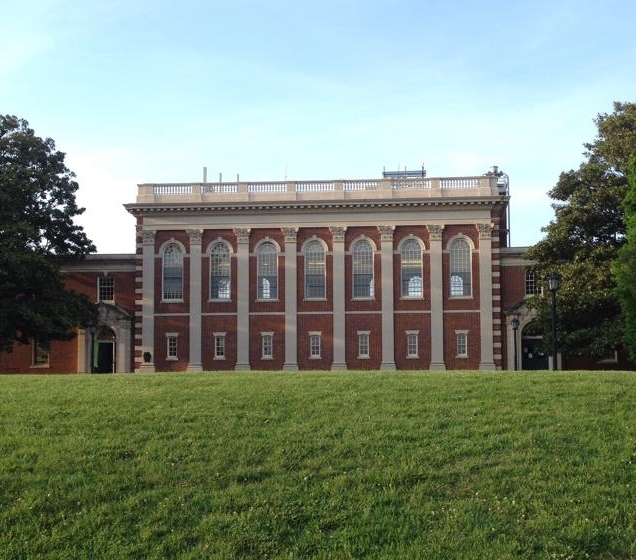
Mary Helen Cochran Library

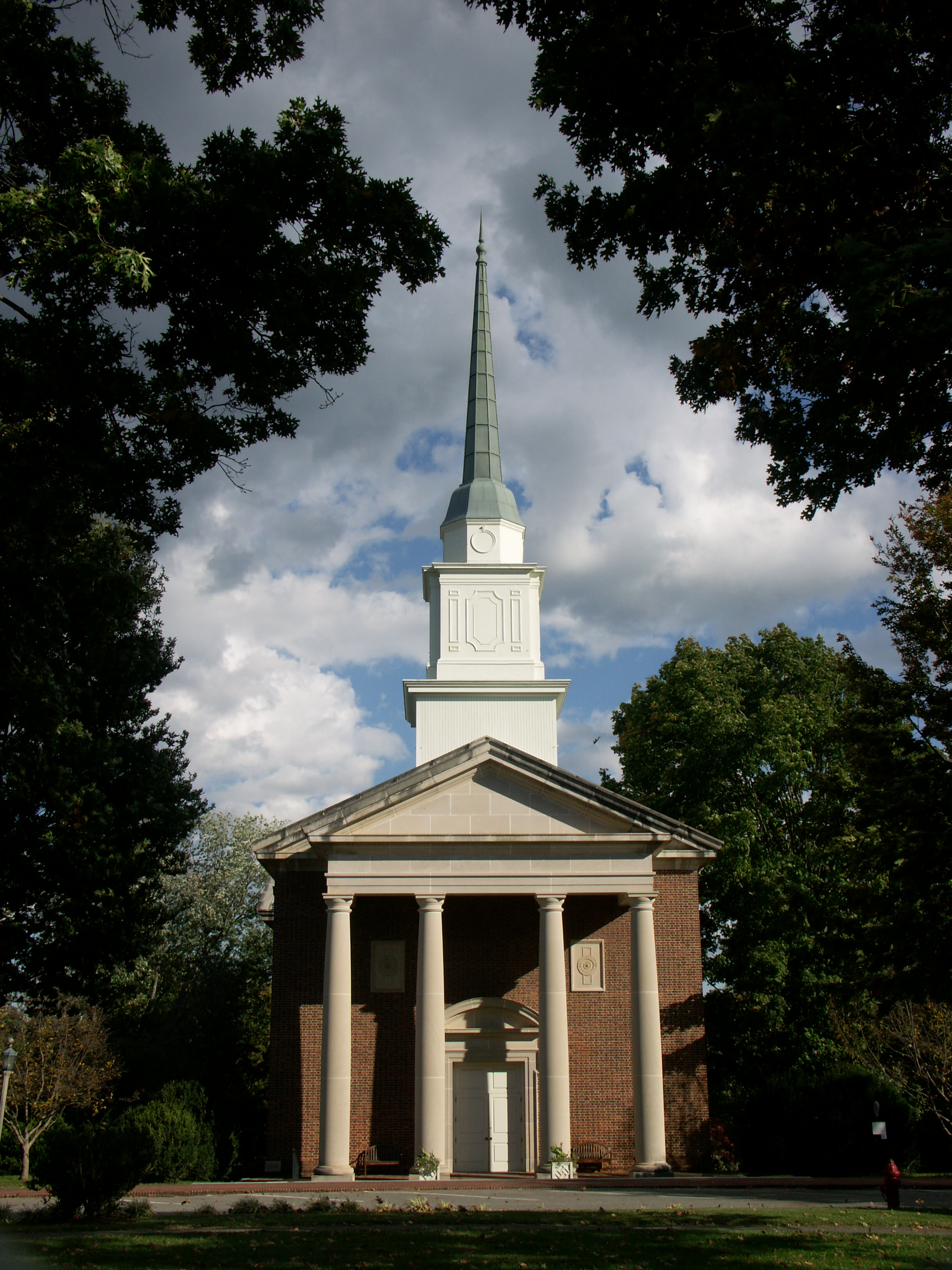
Chapel

== Athletics ==
Sweet Briar athletics wordmark

Sweet Briar athletic teams are the Vixens. The college is a member of the Division III level of the National Collegiate Athletic Association (NCAA), primarily competing in the Old Dominion Athletic Conference (ODAC) since the 1982–83 academic year.

Sweet Briar competes in nine intercollegiate varsity sports: Women's sports include cross country, equestrian, field hockey, golf, lacrosse, soccer, softball, swimming and tennis. Fencing is a Sweet Briar club sport.

Students also participate in recreational sports through the Sweet Briar Outdoor Program (SWEBOP), which organizes a number of trips throughout the year. These include hiking, fly fishing, caving, rock climbing and weekly kayaking and skiing.

=== Riding ===
The college is known for its horseback riding program, which focuses on show and field hunters, hunt seat equitation, and show jumping. The school has seven riding teams. These include a jumper team, a hunter show team, a JV hunter show team, an American National Riding Commission (ANRC) team, a field team and an Intercollegiate Horse Show Association (IHSA) team. As part of its program, students can study for an Equine Studies Certificate with a focus in training or equine management.

Sweet Briar hosted the 23rd Annual ANRC Intercollegiate Equitation Championship judged by Victor Hugo Vidal & Dacia Funkhouser in 2000, and the 37th Annual ANRC Intercollegiate Equitation Championship judged by George H. Morris in 2014.

Sweet Briar's accolades include four ODAC titles (1987, 2012, 2015, 2016), nine ANRC team national championship titles (1978–1980; 1986–1990; 1999), and 10 ANRC team reserve national championships titles (1981–1985; 2000–2002; 2004–2005). Sweet Briar students have been individual national champions nine times, and individual reserve ANRC national champions seven times. In 2006, Sweet Briar's IHSA team won their region (Zone 4, Region 1) and placed second at Zones, qualifying the team for the Nationals Competition. The team placed third overall. In 2008, Sweet Briar's IHSA team again won their region and proceeded to the Nationals, where team members collected individual ribbons.

== Notable people ==
=== Alumnae ===
- Irene Beasley, entertainer
- Colleen Bell, former United States ambassador to Hungary
- Janet Lee Bouvier, mother of Jacqueline Lee Bouvier Kennedy Onassis
- Kate Campanale, former member of the Massachusetts House of Representatives
- Verda Colvin, justice, Supreme Court of Georgia
- Elaine Dundy, author and actress
- Katherine Emery, actress
- Sally Miller Gearhart, educator and writer
- Lendon Gray, Olympic dressage rider
- Angelia Lawrance Morrison Harris, First Lady of North Carolina
- Molly Haskell, feminist film critic and author
- Marie S. Klooz, lawyer and pacifist
- Felisha Leffler, current member of the Vermont House of Representatives
- Marguerite McKee Moss, socialite
- Diana Muldaur, actor and former president of the Academy of Television Arts & Sciences
- Anna Chao Pai, geneticist and professor emerita at Montclair State University
- Anne Poulet, art historian
- Carolyn L. Rose, archaeological conservator for the Smithsonian Institution, one of the first ethnographic conservators in the United States
- Fleming Rutledge, Episcopal priest, author, and Tolkien scholar
- Mary Lee Settle, author, winner of the National Book Award in 1978; founder of the PEN/Faulkner Award for fiction
- Leah Solivan, entrepreneur, founder of TaskRabbit
- Ann Taylor, newscaster
- Elkanah East Taylor (1888–1945), poet; poetry magazine founder
- Patsy Ticer, politician, former mayor of Alexandria, former member of Virginia senate
- Teresa Tomlinson, former mayor of Columbus, Georgia and candidate in the 2020 Democratic Primary to contest the Senate seat of David Perdue
- Marshalyn Yeargin-Allsopp, first African-American student admitted to Sweet Briar College, director of the Developmental Disabilities Branch of the National Center on Birth Defects and Developmental Disabilities (NCBDDD) at the Centers for Disease Control and Prevention

=== Faculty ===
- Carrie Brown, former Margaret Banister Writer-in-Residence, English professor, novelist
- John Gregory Brown, English professor, novelist

=== Previous faculty ===
- Adeline Ames, botany professor
- Marion Elizabeth Blake, classics professor
- Gladys Boone, economics professor from 1931 to 1960
- Lincoln Pierson Brower, entomology and ecology research professor, advocate and world expert on monarch butterflies over six decades
- Seth Clabough, English professor, novelist
- Paul D. Cronin, director of Riding Emeritus, author of Schooling and Riding the Sport Horse
- Cornelius Eady, poet
- Connie Myers Guion, professor of physics, professor and head of the chemistry department at Sweet Briar College 1908–1913 who later earned an M.D. from Cornell University's Weill Medical College
- Mary Harley – campus physician 1906–1935, taught physiology and hygiene classes
- Elizabeth Friench Johnson – assistant professor of Modern Languages, 1917 to 1922
- Iren Marik, classical pianist
- Constance Merritt, former Margaret Banister Writer-in-Residence
- Eugenie Maria Morenus, taught mathematics and Latin
- Elsie Murray, taught psychology 1919–1922
- Mary Oliver, Pulitzer Prize-winning poet
- Barbara A. Perry, Carter Glass Professor of Government, author
- Eva Matthews Sanford, history professor
- Isabelle Stone, physics professor
