= Sweet Briar House =

Historic house in Virginia, United States

- U.S. National Register of Historic Places
- Virginia Landmarks Register
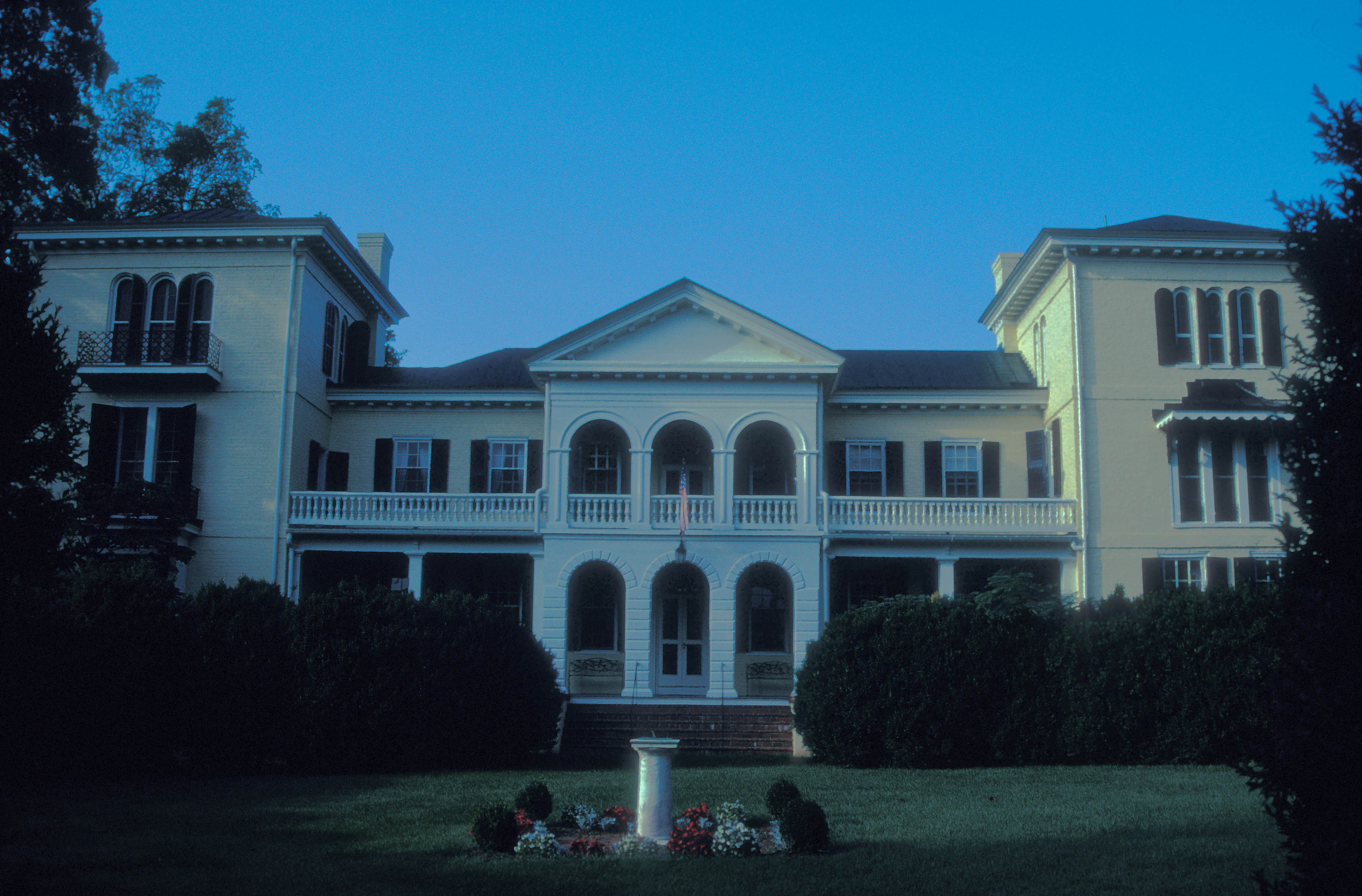
- Sweet Briar House, April 1971

- Location within Virginia Location within the United States
- Location: SW of jct. of U.S. 29 and VA 624, Sweet Briar, Virginia
- Coordinates: 37°33′26″N 79°4′59″W
- Area: 3 acres (1.2 ha)
- Built: c. 1825, 1851
- Architectural style: Italian Villa, Federal
- NRHP reference No.: 70000783
- VLR No.: 005-0018

Significant dates
- Added to NRHP: September 15, 1970
- Designated VLR: July 7, 1970

Sweet Briar House, also known as Locust Ridge, is a historic home located at Sweet Briar, Amherst County, Virginia. The original house was built about 1825, and was a Federal style brick farmhouse with a hipped roof. The house was extensively remodeled in 1851 in the Italian Villa-style. The remodeling added a two-level arcaded portico with a one-story verandah across the facade and two three-story towers of unequal height and form. Also on the property is a late-19th century latticed well house. The house now serves as the residence for the president of Sweet Briar College.

It was added to the National Register of Historic Places in 1970.
