= William Overton Callis =

American politician

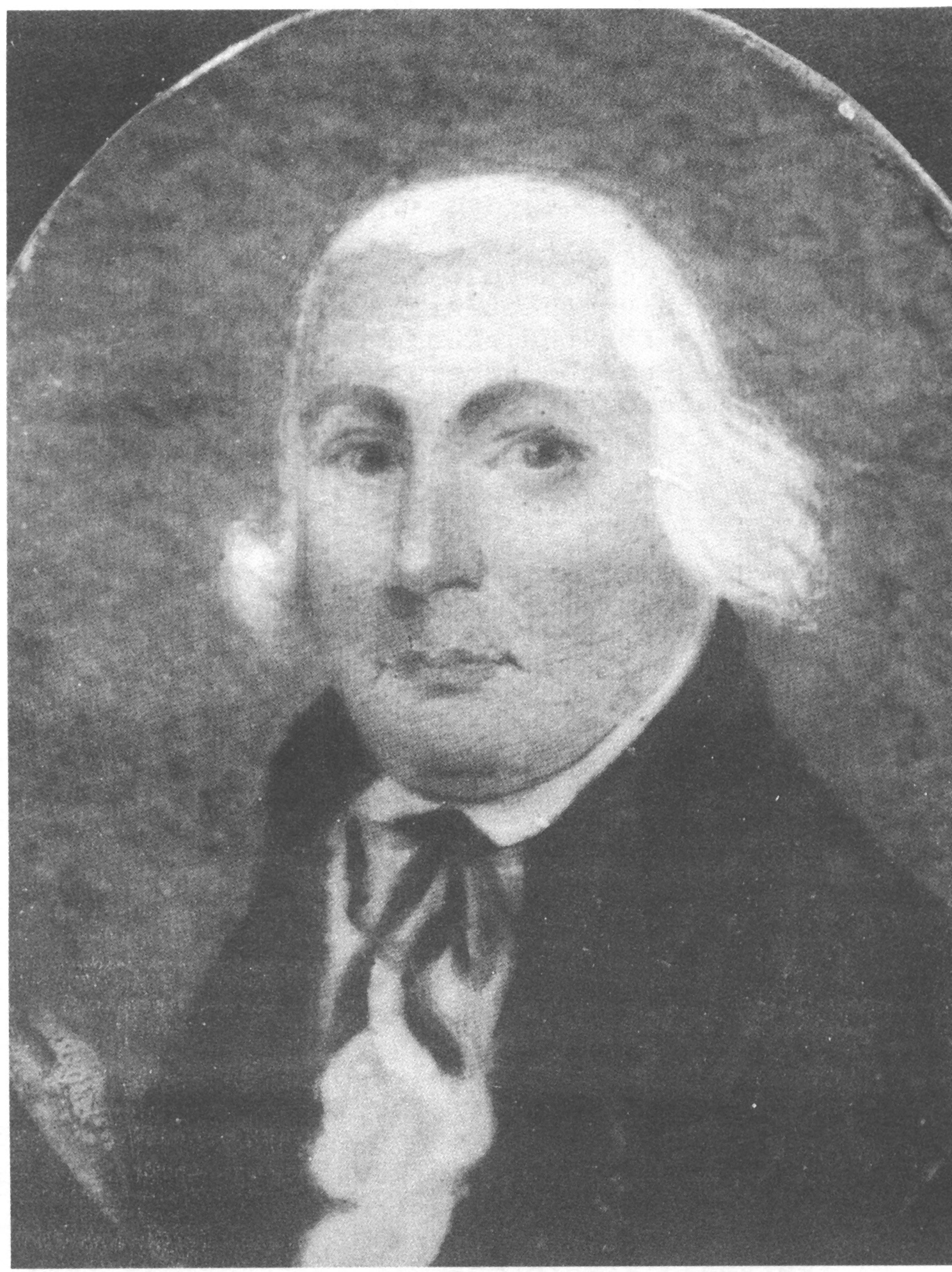
- William Overton Callis by Lawrence Sully (1769–1804).

Personal details
- Born: March 4, 1756 Urbanna, Virginia, US
- Died: March 14, 1814 (aged 58) Doswell, Virginia
- Spouses: Martha Elizabeth Winston; Anne Price
- Education: Hampden-Sydney College; College of William & Mary
- Profession: Politician; Lawyer; Soldier

William O. Callis (March 4, 1756 – March 14, 1814) was the son of William Harry Callis and Mary Jane Cosby. He was a childhood friend of Presidents James Madison and James Monroe, was with Washington at Yorktown, and was known to Lafayette, Thomas Jefferson, and Benedict Arnold.

== Early life ==
William Overton Callis was born March 4, 1756, near Urbanna, Virginia. He was the son of William and Mary (Cosby) Callis. His mother was third in descent from William Overton and Mary Waters.

His mother's first cousin was Dabney Carr, a member of the Virginia House of Burgesses and his wife, Martha Jefferson. Martha was the sister of President Thomas Jefferson and she was also a cousin of William's second wife, Anne Price. Martha's mother was Jane Randolph, daughter of Isham Randolph, a ship's captain and sometime planter, first cousin to Peyton Randolph, and granddaughter of wealthy English gentry. Martha's father was Peter Jefferson, a planter and surveyor in Albemarle County (Shadwell, then Edge Hill, Virginia.) He was of Welsh descent. When Colonel William Randolph, an old friend of Peter Jefferson, died in 1745, Peter assumed executorship and personal charge of William Randolph's estate in Tuckahoe as well as his infant son, Thomas Mann Randolph, Jr. That year the Jeffersons relocated to Tuckahoe where they would remain for the next seven years before returning to their home in Albemarle. Peter Jefferson was then appointed to the Colonelcy of the county, an important position at the time.

Dabney and Martha were the parents of Dabney Carr and nephew of Dabney Smith Carr, who was a newspaper publisher and later was U.S. Minister to Turkey (1843–49).

In 1774, he was tutored, along with James Madison and James Monroe, by Parson John Todd who established in his home near Ochid the first classical school in Louisa County. With Monroe, Callis entered the College of William & Mary at age 17; he left college in late 1775 to join the Continental Army.

== Marriage and family ==
He married first, about 1783, Martha Elizabeth Winston (June 21, 1765 - April 29, 1788). They were the parents of three children.

He married, as his second wife, on May 4, 1790, in Louisa County, Virginia, Anne Price. She was born on November 4, 1774, at "Cool Water", Hanover County, Virginia and died on September 8, 1846, at Doswell, Hanover County, Virginia. They were the parents of nine children.

She was the daughter of Captain Thomas Randolph Price, who served as an officer in the Virginia militia during the American Revolutionary War and was a participant in the Gunpowder Incident and Barbara Overton "Betsy" Winston. Barbara was a first cousin of Martha Elizabeth Winston, the first wife of William Overton Callis.

Anne was a descendant of Cicely Wilford and the Most Reverend Dr. Edwin Sandys, an Anglican church leader who successively held the posts of the Bishop of Worcester (1559–1570), Bishop of London (1570–1576), and the Archbishop of York (1576–1588); Sir George Barne III (1532- d. 1593), the Lord Mayor of London and a prominent merchant and public official from London during the reign of Elizabeth I; William Randolph (bapt. November 7, 1650 – April 11, 1711) was a colonist and land owner who played an important role in the history and government of the Commonwealth of Virginia. He and his wife, Mary Isham, are referred to as "the Adam and Eve of Virginia"; Richard Lovelace, an English poet in the seventeenth century and Francis Lovelace (1621–1675), who was the second governor of the New York colony appointed by the Duke of York, later King James II of England.

Anne was the great great great granddaughter of Captain Thomas Todd who married Elizabeth Bernard making her a cousin of Mary Todd Lincoln. Thomas and Elizabeth were also the great great grandparents of President James Madison. In 1664 Thomas Todd came from England and settled in Ware Parish, Gloucester Co., Va., bringing with him his wife and one or two children born in England. He was a ship master and died at sea in 1676. His wife was Ann Gorsuch, dau, of Rev. John Gorsuch, Rector of Walkham, Hertfordshire and his wife Anne, dau. of Sir William Lovelace. Their children were Thomas, Christopher, James, William, Philip, Joanna, Anne, Frances and Isabella. One of the descendants of Capt. Thomas Todd, the eldest child, was the distinguished jurist, Thomas Todd of Kentucky, who after filling the highest judicial offices in that State was appointed by President Jefferson one of the Associate Justices of the Supreme Court of the United States, and held that office from 1807 till his death in 1824. His abilities and character won him the personal friendship of Chief Justice Marshall, and of the foremost men in the country. His eldest son, Charles Scott Todd was graduated at William and Mary College, practiced law in Frankfort, Ky. In the war of 1812 he was appointed Secretary of State of Kentucky by Gov. Madison; he was sent on a confidential mission to Colombia by the United States Government in 1820, and was appointed minister to Russia by President Tyler in 1841.

Judge Todd's second wife was Lucy Payne sister of Mrs. President Madison; but when he married her she was the widow of George Steptoe Washington, youngest son (by the fourth of his five wives,) of Samuel Washington, brother of George Washington first President of the United States. Isabella the youngest child of Capt. Thomas Todd the immigrant, married John Madision the son of a wealthy planter of the same name, who was the original immigrant of that family. They had two sons, Ambrose and John, the latter was the father of the Right Rev. James Madison, President of William and Mary College, and first Protestant Episcopal Bishop of Virginia, and of his brother George Madison, Gov. of Kentucky. Ambrose married Frances Taylor sister of Zachary Taylor, who was the grandfather of Gen. Zachary Taylor, the thirteenth President of the United States. The wife of President Madison was Dorothea (commonly called Dolly) Payne, though when he married her she was the widow of John Todd, a promising and wealthy young lawyer in Philadelphia. She and her sister Lucy (Judge Todd's second wife) were daughters of John Payne and Mary Coles, a first cousin of Patrick Henry, and grand-daughter of John Payne who came to Virginia early in the eighteenth century, and Anna Fleming, grand-daughter of Sir Thomas Fleming, one of the early settlers of Jamestown, Va. Their family belonged to the society of Friends, and their mother and Grandmother had been as celebrated as they were for beauty and charming manners. The Jefferson and Madison families were very intimate, and as President Jefferson was a widower, and his daughters were married and had duties elsewhere, he was accustomed to ask Mrs. Madison to preside at the social functions in the White House. For President Jefferson's two terms, and for her husband's two terms, therefore, in other words, for sixteen years, she was virtually mistress of the presidential mansion. During her long tenure of this elevated position she became widely known.

== War service ==
In November 1775, he became a Private, 1st Regiment, Capt. John Belfield's Troop, Light Dragoons, Continental Troops commanded by Col. Theoderick Bland.

On September 27, 1776, he enlisted in Col. Charles Dabney's Reg, Capt. Arthur Smith's Company of the 4th Virginia Regiment commanded by Col. Thomas Elliott. He was in New York City in the Battle of the Heights and in Washington's army through his retreat from New York across New Jersey.

On January 12, 1777, he was commissioned 2nd Lieutenant in Capt. John Smith's Company of the 4th Virginia Regiment of Foot, commanded by Col. Robert Lawson.

=== Valley Forge ===
In June 1778, he was commissioned a 1st Lieutenant in Capt. George Wall's Company of the 5th Virginia Regiment of Foot, commanded by Col. James Wood, where he saw service at Camp Valley Forge, Camp Parsinus, Camp White Plains, and Camp Robert's Farm.

On September 30, 1778, he was wounded and listed as a supernumerary after his lungs were damaged by a cannonball at Monmouth. He left the war to go to the West Indies in Havana and Caracas in 1779 to recuperate. After recuperating, he re-entered the service, and in December 1780, he was a Captain of Volunteer Troop of Horses in the 4th Virginia Militia.^{1}

=== At Yorktown ===
March 8, 1781 Yorktown—Letter from Capt. James Maxwell to Gov Jefferson described how a plundering party of about 300 British regulars under Col. Dundas were chased from Yorktown to Newport News by Maj. Callis & Lt. Allen with a small force of volunteers.

On April 6, 1781, now a Major, Callis delivered letters from Brig Gen. Weedon to the British Maj. Gen. W Phillips, Portsmouth, regarding the exchange of prisoners.

After the Siege of Yorktown, March 8, 1781, Capt. James Maxwell wrote a letter to Gov. Thomas Jefferson and described how a plundering party of about 300 British regulars under Col. Dundas were chased from Yorktown to Newport News by Maj. Callis & Lt. Allen with a small force of volunteers.

=== Meets Benedict Arnold ===
On August 1, 1781, having been promoted to Colonel, Callis reported on the fleet in the Portsmouth area to Brig Gen. Weedon at Williamsburg. Louis L. Kean relates how his great-great-great-grandmother Anne (Price) Callis told her grandchildren that Callis met with Benedict Arnold on the James River to arrange for the exchange of prisoners of war. As they waited for the papers to be processed, Arnold asked what would happen if he, Arnold, were taken prisoner. Callis replied, "Sir, the leg that was wounded in the service of your country would be buried with full military honors. The rest of you, they would hang!" A footnote in Irving's Life of Washington (p. 286) relates this incident but does not name the officer.

=== Aide to General Nelson ===
In his widow's application for a pension in 1847, she stated her husband acted as aide de camp to Gen. Nelson in 1781 during the period when the British fleet under Adm. Graves was in Hampton Roads and Lord Cornwallis was operating by land.

=== Lafayette's letter to Jefferson ===
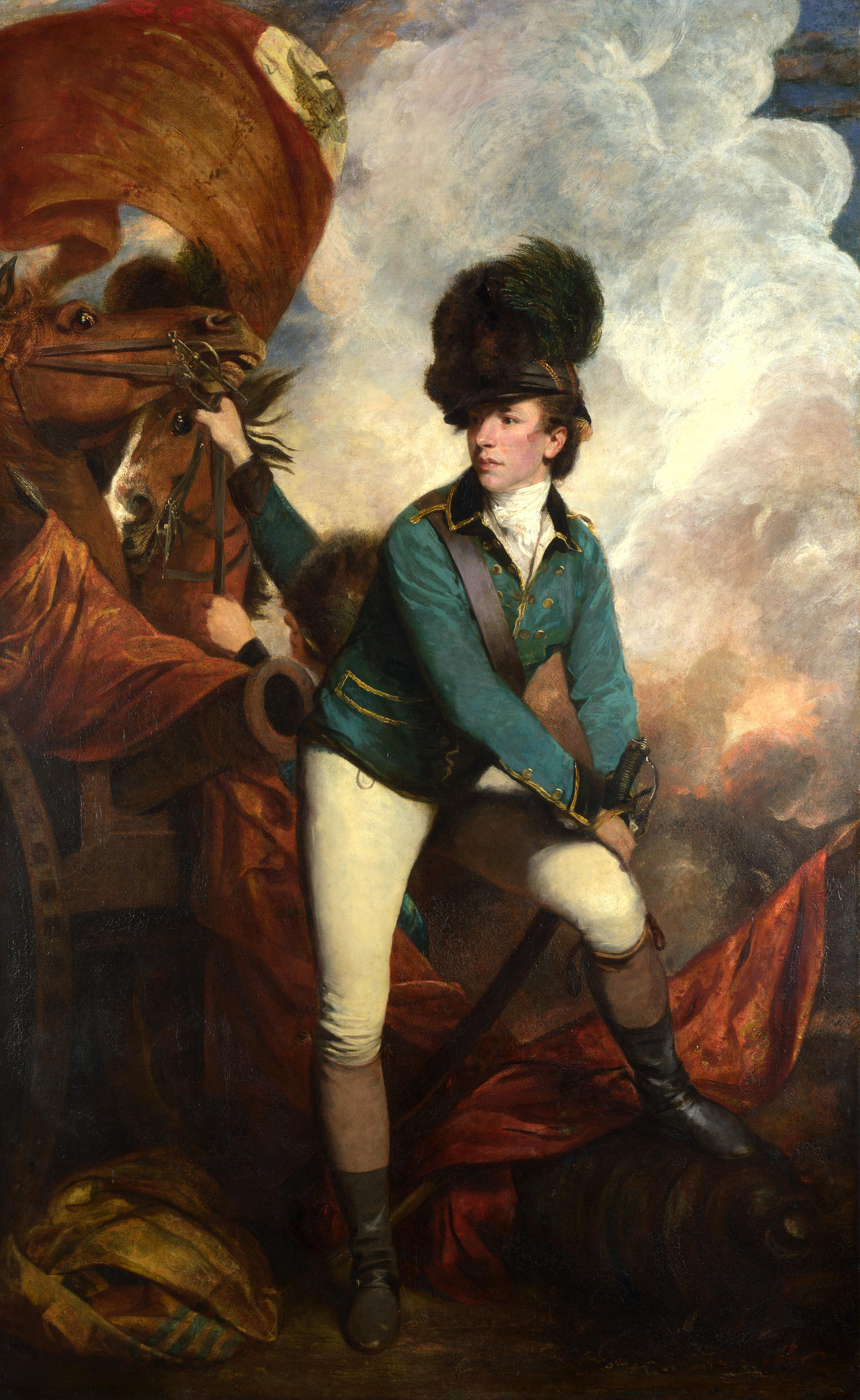
Portrait of Banastre Tarleton by Sir Joshua Reynolds

In the Virginia Magazine of History (V375) was printed a letter from Lafayette to Governor Jefferson, dated July 1, 1781. Lyons Plantation-- "I had yesterday the pleasure to see Maj. Callis and am happy to find you have established a chain of liaison between this camp and the seat of government." Lafayette mentioned the enemy's retreat from Richmond, and their arrival at Williamsburg. He suggested that he go and fight Cornwallis. His troops had managed to get clear of the smallpox; but his men were deserting to harvest their crops. He suggested arming two corps of volunteers of 120 men each with spears (for lack of better weapons), forming a corp of 150 negro pioneers and a corp of 150 negro wagoners to collect horses and weapons from the countryside. "Col. Callis is going up for that same affair (equipping a cavalry) and to him I beg leave to refer your excellency."

In 1782, Col. Callis was at the siege of Yorktown with Lafayette for Cornwallis's surrender; he was an aide to Gen. Nelson.

=== Col. Banastre Tarleton ===
After the British surrender at Yorktown, British officers were paroled. Tarleton was so hated, it was felt an escort away from Yorktown was necessary for Tarleton's safety. Capt. Callis was assigned to the detail. During the trip, Callis became amused when a farmer dashed into the street and grabbed the bridle of the intensely disliked British Col. Tarleton's mount, declaring loudly, "This here be my horse that the damned Britishers stole"—and got his horse back. St. George Tucker, in his journal on the siege of Yorktown, corroborated that Capt. Callis was a witness of this incident. This is the hated British officer portrayed in the movie The Patriot (2000). The character in the movie (Colonel William Tavington) was based on Tarleton as a cruel, sadistic commander who massacred prisoners of war and innocent civilians.

Callis' Revolutionary War service was a total of 7 years and 10 months.

== Later life ==
=== Society of Cincinnati ===
In early May 1783, Callis became a charter member of the Society of Cincinnati, along with Gen. Washington. In 1787, the Society held its meeting a week before the Constitutional Convention when the Articles of Confederation was replaced by the Constitution. 21 of the 55 delegates to the Constitutional Convention were members of the Society. William Overton Callis was one of the 21.

=== Cool Springs ===
On December 7, 1785, he bought Cool Springs plantation, comprising 660 acres (2.7 km^{2}), from Thomas and Lucy Poindexter for 120 pounds. It was near the crossroads of Cuckoo. On January 19, 1788, he bought 340 acres (1.4 km^{2}) from Robert & Barbara Barrett 25 for 320 pounds. By 1788, he was the 50th largest land owner, 57th wealthiest land owner, and the 70th largest slave owner in Louisa County. He owned over 1,000 acres (4.0 km^{2}) worth then around 500 pounds. He owned 15 slaves, 5 horses, and 15 cattle.

==== Constitutional convention and politics ====
In 1788, he was a representative from Louisa County to the Virginia Ratifying Convention where they ratified United States Constitution. Virginia was not necessarily as a whole inclined to ratify. There were eight representatives, one of which is our subject here, whose constituency was decidedly against ratification. Callis was persuaded to vote for the ratification against his citizen's opinion. Had he and the other seven not changed their votes, Virginia would not have ratified the constitution, at least at that vote. (Wm. Writ Henry, Life of Patrick Henry)

He was a representative to the Virginia General Assembly from Louisa County for 17 years.

Callis was an elector from Virginia in Washington's unanimous election to a second term in 1793. Until 1800, each elector had two votes. Callis voted with all the other electors unanimously using one vote for Washington. His second vote went for Republican George Clinton of New York as did the other electors from Virginia. Washington won president with 132 votes, but Clinton came in third with 50 votes behind Federalist John Adams (77 votes), who became vice president. George Clinton later became Governor of New York (1777) and ultimately become VP (1805–1812) under both Jefferson and Madison.

==== Letters from Thomas Jefferson ====
During the time between serving as the first Secretary of State and as the second vice president on May 8, 1795, Thomas Jefferson wrote to Callis at Cuckoo, requesting him to negotiate the purchase of Nance, a 34-year-old weaver, from Jefferson's brother-in-law Hastings Marks; Jefferson was resuming the business of domestic manufacture and needed a weaver but must pay for her out of next year's crops. Callis lived less than 40 miles from Monticello.

While serving as president, Jefferson responds to a letter from Callis asking Jefferson for a position for Callis' son in the Navy. "Washington, July 19,04 In receipt of your letter asking employment in the Navy for your son. I enclosed it to the Secretary of the Navy. He is at present at Baltimore. His answer is that your son can take his station with the midshipmen, and that his first employment will be in one of the gunboats. You omitted to mention his name, or the warrant would now have been sent. As I set out for Montecello in six days, it will be shorter for you to address the information to Robert Smith, Secretary of the Navy at Baltimore. He will forward the warrant and instructions to whatever place you shall direct. Accept my friendly salutations and assurances of great asteem and respect. Thos Jefferson"

==== Retirement, death, and burial ====
In 1790, he built his last home, "Needmore", in Cuckoo, Virginia across the road from his ordinary Cuckoo Tavern which he also bought in 1807. Needmore was a large two-story southern style frame farmhouse.

It was at Cuckoo Tavern during the war that Jack Jouett overheard English officers plotting the capture of Gov. Jefferson and the Virginia legislature, then convened at Monticello. Jouett made the perilous ride over back roads in the dead of night to warn them so they were long gone when the British arrived the next day.

In 1800, Callis retired from politics. On March 14, 1814, he died at his Needmore home; he is buried in Fork Episcopal Church Cemetery, Point of Fork, 12566 Old Ridge Road, Doswell, Va Hanover County, Virginia, with his second wife Ann (Price) Callis. General Nelson's wife is also buried in this cemetery.(3) The Fork Church is 15 miles (24 km) north of Richmond and 1/2 mile east of Cool Water. This church was also that of Patrick Henry, and they were fellow attendees during their lives.

After Callis' death in 1814, Needmore was sold four years later in 1818 to Henry Pendleton. In 1912, it was torn down and replaced by the home of the present Pendleton family.

== See also ==
- Virginia Regiment
