= Peter Carr (Virginia politician) =

American politician

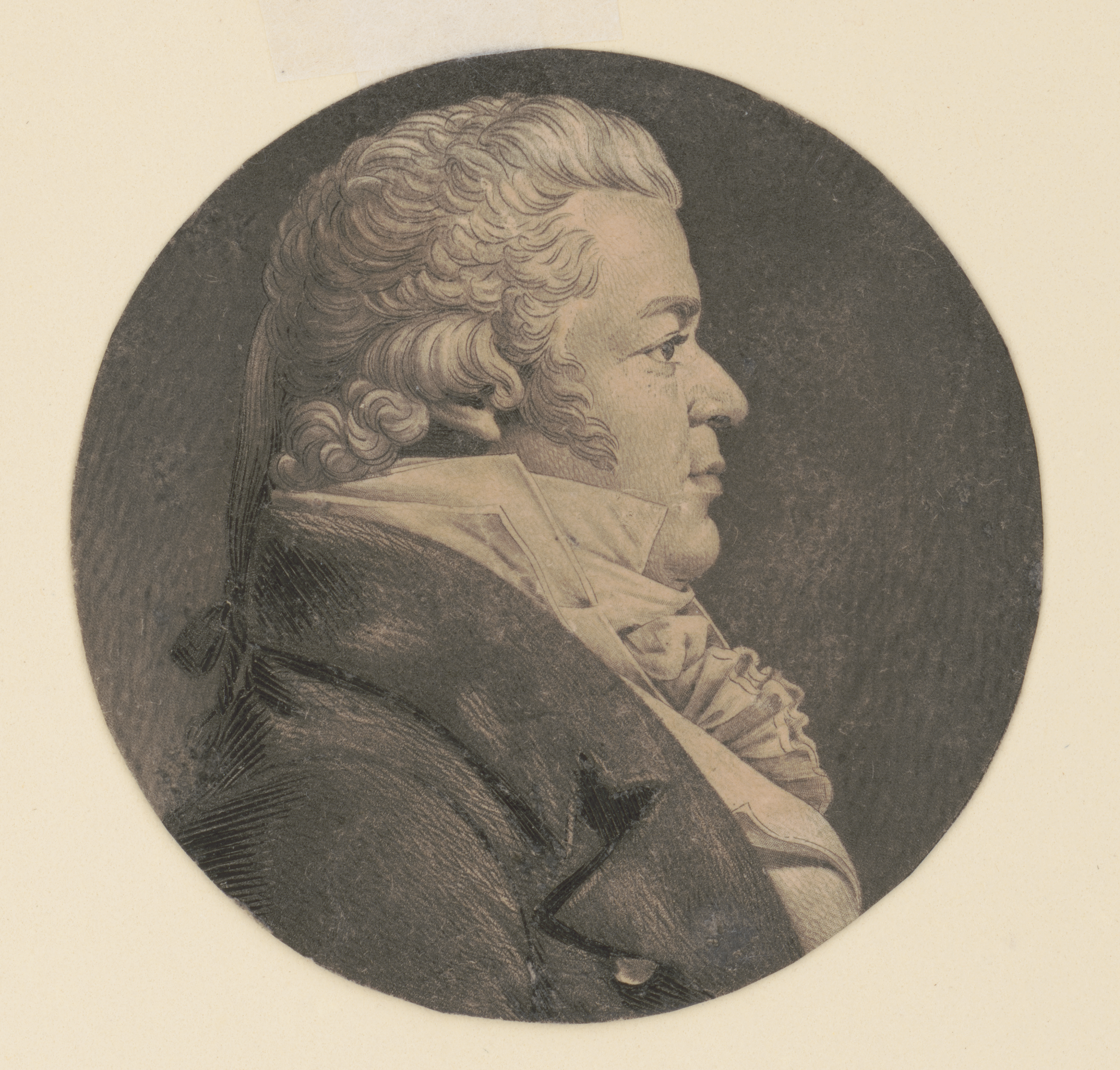
- portrait by Charles Balthazar Julien Fevret de Saint-Mémin

Member of the Virginia House of Delegates from Albemarle County, Virginia
- In office December 7, 1807 – December 4, 1808 Serving with Hugh Nelson
- Preceded by: Walter Leake
- Succeeded by: Rice Garland
- In office December 7, 1801 – December 2, 1804 Serving with Peter Garland, Edward Garland
- Preceded by: Francis Walker
- Succeeded by: William Waller Hening

Personal details
- Born: January 2, 1770 Goochland County, Virginia
- Died: February 17, 1815 (aged 45) Carrsbrook
- Spouse: Esther "Hetty" Smith Stevenson
- Children: 8
- Parent(s): Dabney Carr; Martha Jefferson Carr
- Relatives: Thomas Jefferson (uncle); Samuel Carr (brother); Dabney Carr (brother)
- Occupation: Politician, planter, educator

Peter Carr (January 2, 1770 – February 17, 1815) was a Virginia planter, lawyer and politician who served several terms in the Virginia House of Delegates representing Albemarle County. While he founded an academy which evolved into the University of Virginia, he may now be known primarily for his correspondence with his uncle Thomas Jefferson, or for fathering children by enslaved women per the Jefferson–Hemings controversy.

== Early life and education ==
Carr was born in Goochland County, Virginia on January 2, 1770, to Dabney and Martha Jefferson Carr, sister to Thomas Jefferson. His father died when he was three years old, and his mother while initially remaining at their Spring Forest plantation, by 1781 moved to Monticello with her three sons and three daughters. While his younger brothers were educated in Maryland near the new national capital under an uncle's supervision (and ultimately married two of Overton Carr's daughters), Peter Carr was educated at a boarding school run by Rev. Walker Maury in Orange and continued after it was moved to Williamsburg. Carr then attended the College of William and Mary (1786–1789) and read law with first George Wythe, then Thomas Jefferson at Spring Forest and Monticello.

== Personal life ==
Carr married the widow Esther "Hetty" Smith Stevenson on June 6, 1797, and helped raise her son by her first husband. The couple also had four sons and four daughters children together, although only two sons (the eldest being Dabney S. Carr) and three daughters reached adulthood.

== Career ==
=== Planter ===
Although Jefferson had hoped Carr would have a distinguished legal or political career, neither materialized. In late 1794, Carr inherited about 500 acres of land and some slaves after his father died, but primarily lived at Monticello until Jefferson's construction projects caused him to move to nearly Charlottesville (also the Albemarle county seat). Carr was admitted to the bar by the summer of 1793, but only briefly practiced as a lawyer. After 1798 Carr lived at "Carrsbrook," a plantation of about 900 acres about five miles north of Charlottesville that Carr purchased from Wilson Cary Nicholas, his wife's brother in law. In the 1810 federal census, Carr's household included 9 free whites and 30 enslaved people in Albemarle County. By the time of his death, Carr also owned 199 acres that adjoined Carrsbrook, but only 14 slaves and ten horses.

=== Politician ===
Carr became a justice of the peace in Albemarle County in 1801. He supported Jefferson's Republican Party and in 1799 had unsuccessfully sought a seat in the Virginia House of Delegates. Another attempt proved successful in 1801 and Carr was re-elected four times, with a gap (thus from 1801 to 1804, then in the 1807 to 1808 session). Carr's campaign for Virginia State Senate also failed.

Carr triggered the final breach between his uncle and George Washington by writing a seemingly sympathetic letter to the president on September 27, 1797 under the pseudonym "John Langhorne." Washington was suspicious, and John Nicholas (the Federalist clerk of Albemarle County, Jefferson's home county), informed Washington that "Langhorne" was actually Carr and leagued with Republican interests, and thus may have been attempting to bait Washington into revealing High Federalist principles. Nonetheless, Carr's exact purpose in writing the letter remains unknown.

=== Educator ===
Carr long supported education, and in 1811, he opened up a short-lived academy at Carrsbrook. In 1803 he had become a founding trustee of the Albemarle Academy, and in 1814 he and the academy's other trustees added Jefferson to the governing board. Jefferson wrote Carr about his educational philosophy in that year. Eventually the Albemarle Academy evolved into the Central College then the University of Virginia.

=== Jefferson–Hemings controversy ===
In 1802 journalist James Thomson Callender claimed that Thomas Jefferson had fathered at least three sons and three daughters with one of his slaves, Sally Hemings. These claims were given some credence because of Jefferson's presence at Monticello during the time periods that the children were conceived and the lack of pregnancies when he was not present, but the controversy exploded long after both men had died, as discussed below. Carr and his brother Samuel were among Virginia aristocrats who during their lifetimes had reputations for requesting sexual favors from enslaved women while visiting plantations owned by other men.

== Military service, death and legacy ==
After British forces burned Washington, D.C. in August 1814, despite his corpulence and reputation for "extreme indolence", Carr joined the Virginia militia guarding approaches to Richmond, although the British armies instead moved northward against Baltimore. Carr returned home, but his delicate health worsened. Carr wrote Jefferson about his rheumatism, ague and fever two weeks before his death. Carr died in his home at Carrsbrook on February 17, 1815. Because his last will and testament requested that he be buried alongside his parents, he is presumed buried in the family cemetery at Monticello, but no grave marker survives.

Jefferson died more than a decade later. He freed two of Hemings' children in his own last will and testament, and is believed to have let two others escape to free states in the North. In the 1870 federal census in Ohio and in a newspaper article published in 1873, Madison Hemings claimed Jefferson was his father, reigniting the controversy, which Jefferson's former overseer, Edmund Bacon had attempted to quench in his 1862 memoir which denied Jefferson fathered Hemings' children (and Bacon claimed to know the father but refused to name him). Secondhand accounts written by Thomas Jefferson Randolph (Jefferson's grandson) in 1858 and 1868 named this man and his younger brother Samuel Carr (who fathered children by Sally's sister Betsy) as the father. In a private letter to her husband in 1858, Ellen Randolph Coolidge called Carr, " the most notorious good-natured Turk that ever was master of a black seraglio kept at other men's expense" and also condemned "dissipated young men in the neighborhood who sought the society of the mulatresses." Further literary paternity analyses in the 1950s continued to blame the Carrs. However, in 1997 historian Annette Gordon-Reed made a strong case for Jefferson's paternity, prompting DNA analyses of descendants of Eston Hemings, which concluded neither Carr brother could have fathered that child, and suggested Jefferson as the father. Some scholars nonetheless give credence to these claims for Hemings' other children, or those of other enslaved women at Jefferson's residences.
