= David S. Garland =

American politician (1769–1841)

David Shepherd Garland

Member of the U.S. House of Representatives from Virginia's 21st district
- In office January 10, 1810 – March 3, 1811
- Preceded by: Wilson C. Nicholas
- Succeeded by: Hugh Nelson

Personal details
- Born: September 27, 1769 New Glasgow, Virginia Colony, British America
- Died: October 7, 1841 (aged 72) Clifford, Virginia, U.S.
- Resting place: Winton, Virginia, U.S.
- Party: Democratic-Republican; Whig

David Shepherd Garland (September 27, 1769 – October 7, 1841) was a U.S. representative from Virginia.

== Family ==
Garland was the son of William Garland and Ann Shepherd. He married Jane Henry Meredith. They had 11 children. Jane was the daughter of Colonel Samuel Meredith and Jane Henry, sister of Patrick Henry. Jane grew up in the Winton House, neighboring the Garland home.

== Early life and education ==
Born near New Glasgow (now Clifford) in the Colony of Virginia, Garland pursued an academic course. He studied law.

== Career ==
Garland was admitted to the bar and commenced practice in Virginia. He served as member of the Virginia House of Delegates during the periods 1799–1802 and 1805–1809. He served in the Senate of Virginia in the years 1809–1811. A wealthy man, he built the Brick House and was involved with the New Glasgow Academy, an early public school.

Garland was elected as a Democratic-Republican to the Eleventh Congress to fill the vacancy caused by the resignation of Wilson Cary Nicholas and served from January 17, 1810, to March 4, 1811, and was succeeded by Hugh Nelson. In the election, he defeated Thomas M. Randolph, nephew of Thomas Jefferson. He was again a member of the State house of delegates in 1814, 1815, from 1819 to 1826, and 1832 to 1836. In 1828, he was a member of a 13 man committee in the Virginia legislature which made recommendations for the internal improvements, particularly in the course of the James River, but also of the course of the Potomac River and the Roanoke River and in the condition of the roads. For many years he was chairman of the Committee of Finance.

He was a member of the Electoral College from Virginia in 1828 and cast his vote with the rest of the state's electors for Andrew Jackson. In the 1810s, Garland was president of the Board of Trustees of the New Glasgow Female Academy, and served the board for many years. In 1824 and 1825 he was a director of the Lynchburg branch of the Bank of Virginia. In the 1820s, he served as Commissioner of the Kanawah road and river. Late in his life he was a member of the Whig Party.

He died in Clifford, Virginia on October 7, 1841. He was interred in the Meredith and Garland families' graveyard at Winton, Clifford, Virginia.

U.S. House of Representatives
Preceded by Wilson C. Nicholas	Member of the U.S. House of Representatives from Virginia's 21st congressional district January 10, 1810 - March 3, 1811	Succeeded by Hugh Nelson
