= Geddes (Clifford, Virginia) =

Historic house in Virginia, United States

- U.S. National Register of Historic Places
- Virginia Landmarks Register
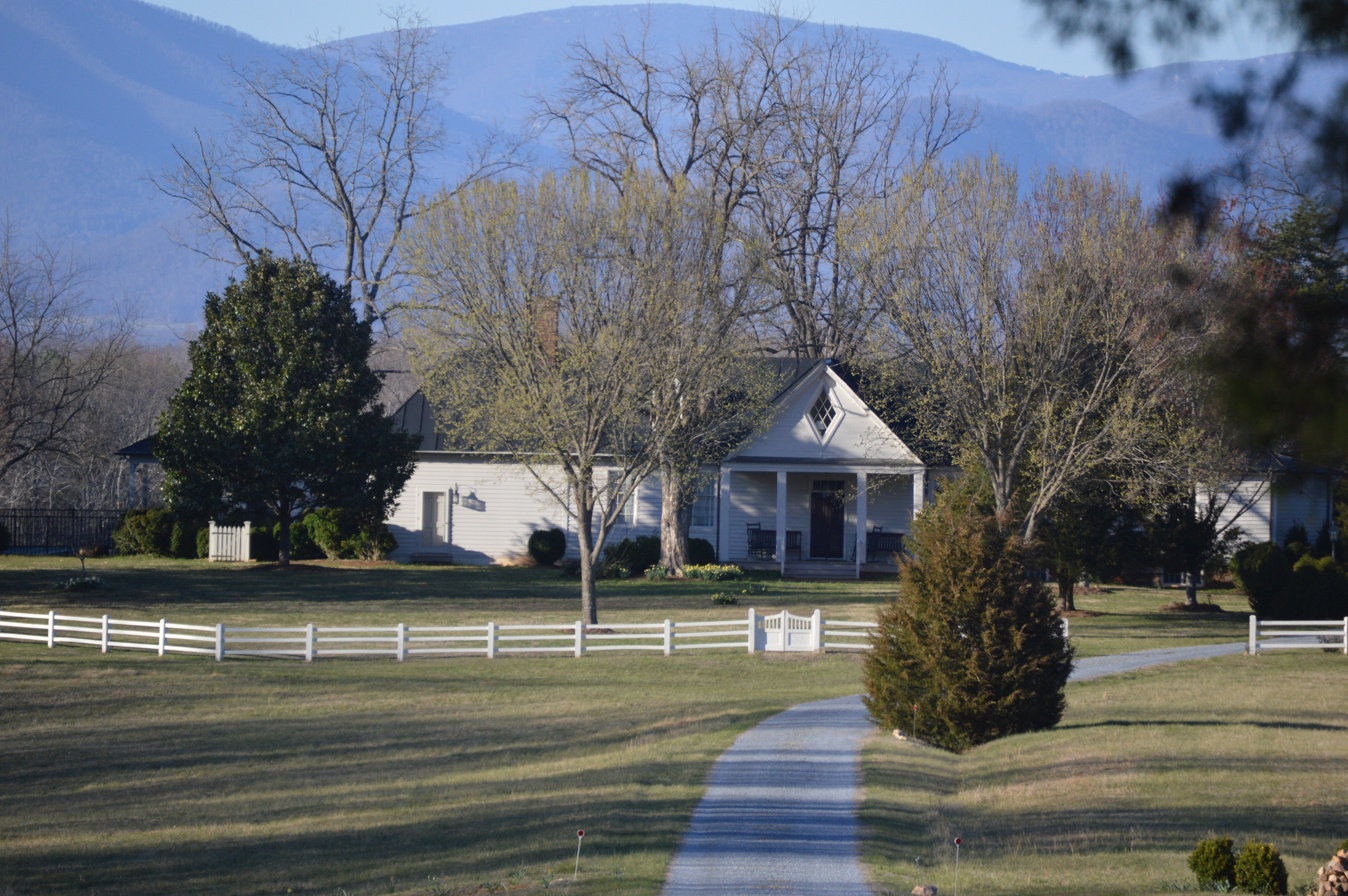
- Roadside view of the farmhouse

- Location within Virginia Location within the United States
- Location: Jefferson Trace, near Clifford, Virginia
- Coordinates: 37°39′57″N 78°59′15″W
- Area: 13 acres (5.3 ha)
- Built by: Col. Hugh Rose
- Architectural style: Colonial
- NRHP reference No.: 83003257
- VLR No.: 005-0007

Significant dates
- Added to NRHP: February 24, 1983
- Designated VLR: October 19, 1982

Geddes is a historic home located near Clifford, Amherst County, Virginia. It was built in several stages between about 1762 and the mid-19th century. It is a 1 1/2-story, Colonial era frame house of post and beam construction with a hipped roof. It is referred to as the oldest house in Amherst County by area residents. Its builder, Hugh Rose, is best remembered as the friend of Thomas Jefferson who looked after Jefferson's family at Geddes during the British raid on Charlottesville in 1781.

It was added to the National Register of Historic Places in 1983.
