= Mountain View Farm (Clifford, Virginia) =

Historic house in Virginia, United States

- U.S. National Register of Historic Places
- Virginia Landmarks Register
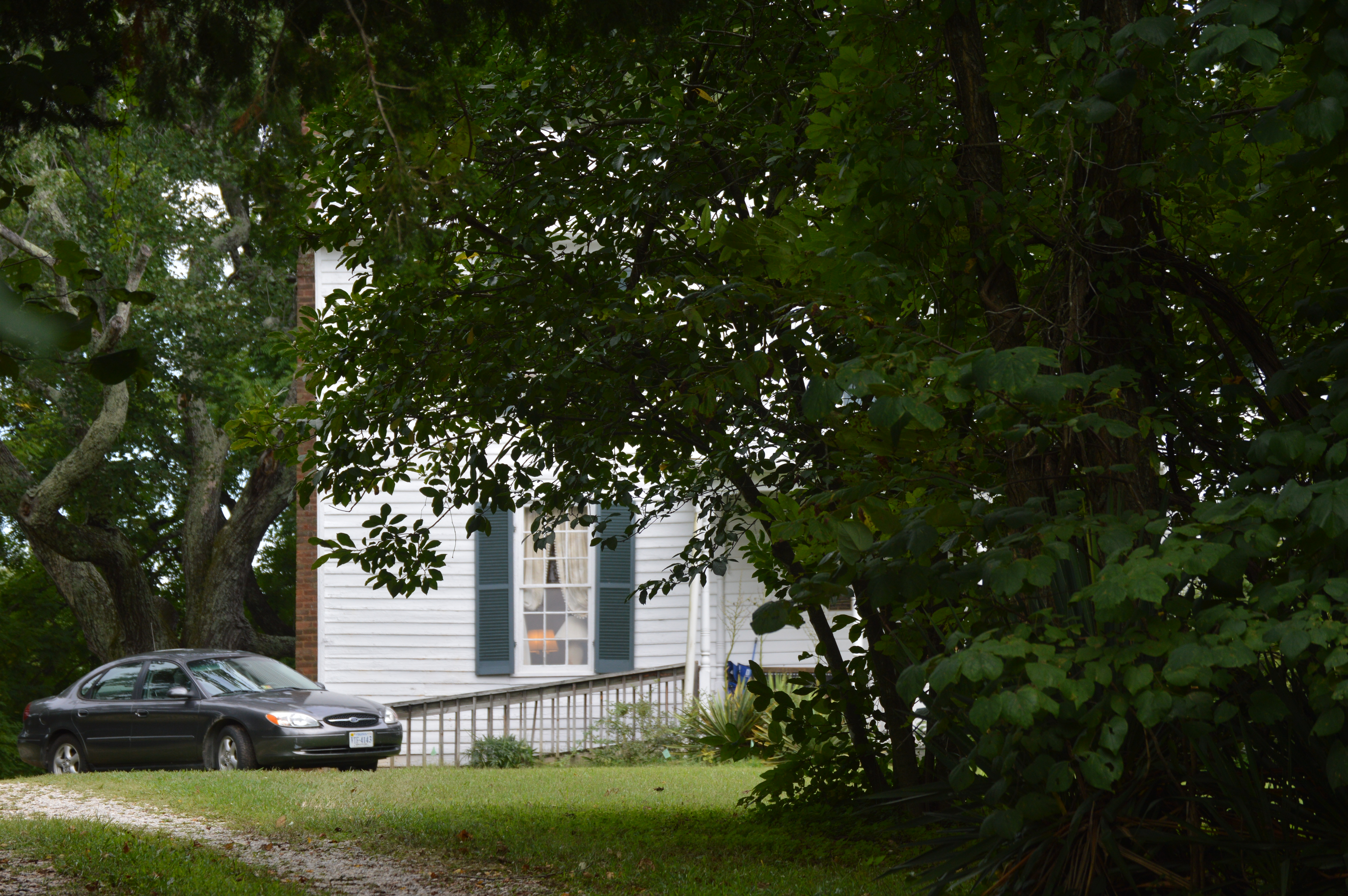
- Farmhouse, seen through the trees

- Location within Virginia Location within the United States
- Location: Junction of County Route 3 and US 29 (2229 North Amherst Hwy.), near Clifford, Virginia
- Coordinates: 37°38′32″N 78°59′10″W
- Area: 65.3 acres (26.4 ha)
- Built: c. 1777, 1831
- Built by: Col. Hugh Rose, Paul Carrington Cabell
- Architectural style: Colonial, Georgian
- NRHP reference No.: 96001453
- VLR No.: 005-0011

Significant dates
- Added to NRHP: September 3, 1997
- Designated VLR: September 19, 1996

Mountain View Farm, also known as Spencer Plantation and Mountain View Farm at Rebec Vineyards, is a historic home and farm located near Clifford, Amherst County, Virginia. The property includes an 18th-century mansion, built about 1777, a 19th-century cottage and five other supporting buildings. The main house is a standard timber frame, two-story, three-bay, I-house with a rear ell addition. It is sheathed in weatherboard with end chimneys. It was moved to its present site in 1831. The cottage is a one-room building with a lean-to shed addition. It was originally used as a doctor's office by Dr. Paul Carrington Cabell, and probably dates to the 1830s or 40s. Also on the property are the contributing well house, a playhouse (originally a chicken coop), a smokehouse, an ice house, carriage house, and a chicken coop. The property has been home to Rebec Vineyards since 1987.

It was added to the National Register of Historic Places in 1997.
