= Samuel Carr (politician) =

American politician, nephew of Thomas Jefferson

Member of the Virginia Senate from Albemarle, Nelson and Amherst Counties
- In office December 7, 1835 – December 1, 1839
- Preceded by: Charles Cocke
- Succeeded by: Charles Cocke

Member of the Virginia House of Delegates from Albemarle County, Virginia
- In office December 7, 1818 – December 5, 1819
- Preceded by: Dabney Minor
- Succeeded by: Thomas Mann Randolph

Member of the Maryland House of Delegates from Prince George's County, Maryland
- In office 1801–1803

Personal details
- Born: October 9, 1771 Goochland County, Virginia
- Died: July 26, 1855 (aged 83) Charleston, West Virginia
- Spouse(s): Ellen Boucher, Maria Watson Dabney
- Children: 5–7
- Parent(s): Dabney Carr; Martha Jefferson Carr
- Relatives: Thomas Jefferson (uncle); Dabney Carr (brother); Peter Carr (brother)
- Occupation: Politician, Planter

Samuel Carr (1771-1855) was an American politician, soldier, and planter who served in the Maryland House of Delegates, the Virginia House of Delegates, and the Virginia Senate. However, he is today best known for being named in the Jefferson-Hemings controversy as he, alongside his brother Peter, was at one time rumored to have fathered children by Sally Hemings.

== Early life and education ==
Carr was born on October 9, 1771, at Spring Forest, a plantation in Goochland County, Virginia, the middle son of Virginia politician, planter, and lawyer Dabney Carr and Martha Jefferson Carr. Martha was the sister of Thomas Jefferson, and therefore Samuel Carr was Jefferson's nephew. His father died when Carr was less than two years old. For a time his mother attempted to continue raising her 3 young sons and 3 daughters at Spring Forest, but by 1781 the family had moved to Monticello, Jefferson's main plantation. Jefferson was an executor of Dabney Carr's estate, and arranged for relative, Overton Carr, to guide Samuel's education. Overton Carr had married Anne Addison, who inherited a plantation in Oxon Hill, Maryland. Thus Samuel moved to Prince George's County, Maryland, where he and his younger brother Dabney met and ultimately married two of Overton Carr's daughters (though they were first cousins). Jefferson also helped to secure the promised inheritance of a nearby plantation in Albemarle County, Dunlora, which had been promised to Samuel by his namesake uncle (Samuel Carr 1746-1777) at his birth, shortly before Capt. Carr (who served in the 9th Virginia Regiment as lieutenant before commanding the marines aboard the brigantine 'Northampton') died fighting for the new country. Dunlora plantation had been patented by his great-great grandfather Thomas Carr in 1730, possibly when he was representing King William County in the House of Burgesses, the predecessor of the Virginia General Assembly in which this man served (also part-time).

== Personal and plantation life ==
After reaching legal age and securing Dunlora, Carr moved back to Virginia to with his wife and his mother. He farmed using enslaved labor, as had his father and many other relatives, some sharing the same name. In 1800, Overton Carr (either his father-in-law or brother-in-law) owned 8 slaves in Prince George's County, Maryland, and Samuel Carr seven slaves. In the 1810 census this man owned 33 slaves in Albemarle County, Virginia while his younger brother Dabney owned five enslaved people. In the 1840 census, Samuel owned 29 enslaved people in the same county.

Carr would have four children with his first wife Ellen Boucher Carr, before a prolonged illness ended her life in July, 1815, leaving Samuel a widower. Carr would outlive their daughter Martha (1808-1816) and their sons John Carr (1801-1839, who became a lieutenant in the U.S. Navy) and H. Dabney Overton Carr (1806-1841, a West Point graduate killed in Mexico), so only James Lawrence Carr (1813-1875) who moved to Kanawha County in 1830 survived his father. During the interval before he remarried, Carr may have fathered at least one child, and perhaps two children, with a free woman of color named Judath Barnett who lived near Dunlora. Two of Barnett's children, Miles and Zachariah, later changed their last name to Carr, and Samuel helped secure an apprenticeship for Miles, although at no point did he publicly acknowledge that either of the boys were his.

In December 1818, Samuel Carr remarried, taking a much younger Maria Watson Dabney as his wife, with whom he would have one more son, George Watson Carr (1823-1899) and two daughters who married (Maria Jefferson Miller and Sally Carr), the latter dying shortly after her son's birth. Over the next decade, Carr rebuilt the plantation house at Dunlora, in part using brick leftover from the construction of the main buildings at the University of Virginia. He continued to expand plantation operations, and by 1830 he owned 44 slaves.

By the mid-1840s, Carr had deeded all his property to his children. In the 1850 census, he continued to live in Albemarle County, in the household of relative William S. Dabney. Carr eventually moved closer to his eldest son in Kanawha County in the western reaches of Virginia, which after his death and during the American Civil War separated to form West Virginia.

== Public career ==
Carr served, from 1792 to 1802, as Captain of Cavalry in Albemarle County's First Battalion, 47th Regiment. During the War of 1812, he again served a Captain of Cavalry, this time with the Albemarle Volunteers, First Elite Corps, under Colonel Thomas Mann Randolph (his second cousin once removed). This unit's mission was to defend Norfolk, but they saw little, if any, action. Carr was discharged in Richmond on September 20, 1814.

Carr served in the Maryland House of Delegates during the 1801–1802 and 1802–1803 terms, representing Prince George's County, Maryland, before his return in 1803 to Virginia. He later served in both the Virginia House of Delegates (1818-1819) and the Virginia Senate (1835-1839). Carr also a justice of the peace in Albemarle County, Virginia.

== Jefferson-Hemings controversy ==
In 1802 journalist James Thomson Callender claimed that Thomas Jefferson had fathered children with one of his slaves, Sally Hemings. These claims were given credence due to several factors such as Jefferson's presence at Monticello during the time periods that the children were conceived and the lack of pregnancies when he was not present. However, the controversy did not erupt until after this man's death, as related below.

== Death and legacy ==
Carr died on July 26, 1855, in Charleston, later the capital of West Virginia, at age 83. His remains were transferred to Monticello for burial near his mother and father. Both his sons who survived until the Civil War fought for the Confederacy. James Lawrence Carr (at whose home he died) attained the rank of Major. His youngest son, George Watson Carr (who had graduated from the University of Virginia and began a legal career but abandoned for a military career), served first with the U.S. Army in the Mexican American War, then as a mercenary in Crimea, and finally in the Confederate States Army, where he attained the rank of Colonel and served under Gen. Jubal S. Early before moving to Roanoke, Virginia for his final years.

Theories that Carr and his brother Peter could have fathered the Hemings children surfaced, not long after this man's death, both in 1858 and during the American Civil War, particularly due to secondhand accounts by Thomas Jefferson Randolph, Ellen Randolph Coolidge and Jefferson's former overseer concerning claims that this man or his brother Peter were responsible. While the overseer did not name the white man repeatedly visiting the enslaved women, the Randolphs named this man as fathering the last children born to Sally's sister, Betty Hemings Brown, Robert and Mary, circa 1800. These claims are still given credence by some scholars, even though DNA tests in 1998 ruled that neither of the Carr brothers could have fathered one of Sally Hemings's children, Eston. Dunlora survived the American Civil War and the Great Depression, but was razed in modern times.
