= Clifford–New Glasgow Historic District =

Historic district in Virginia, United States

- U.S. National Register of Historic Places
- U.S. Historic district
- Virginia Landmarks Register
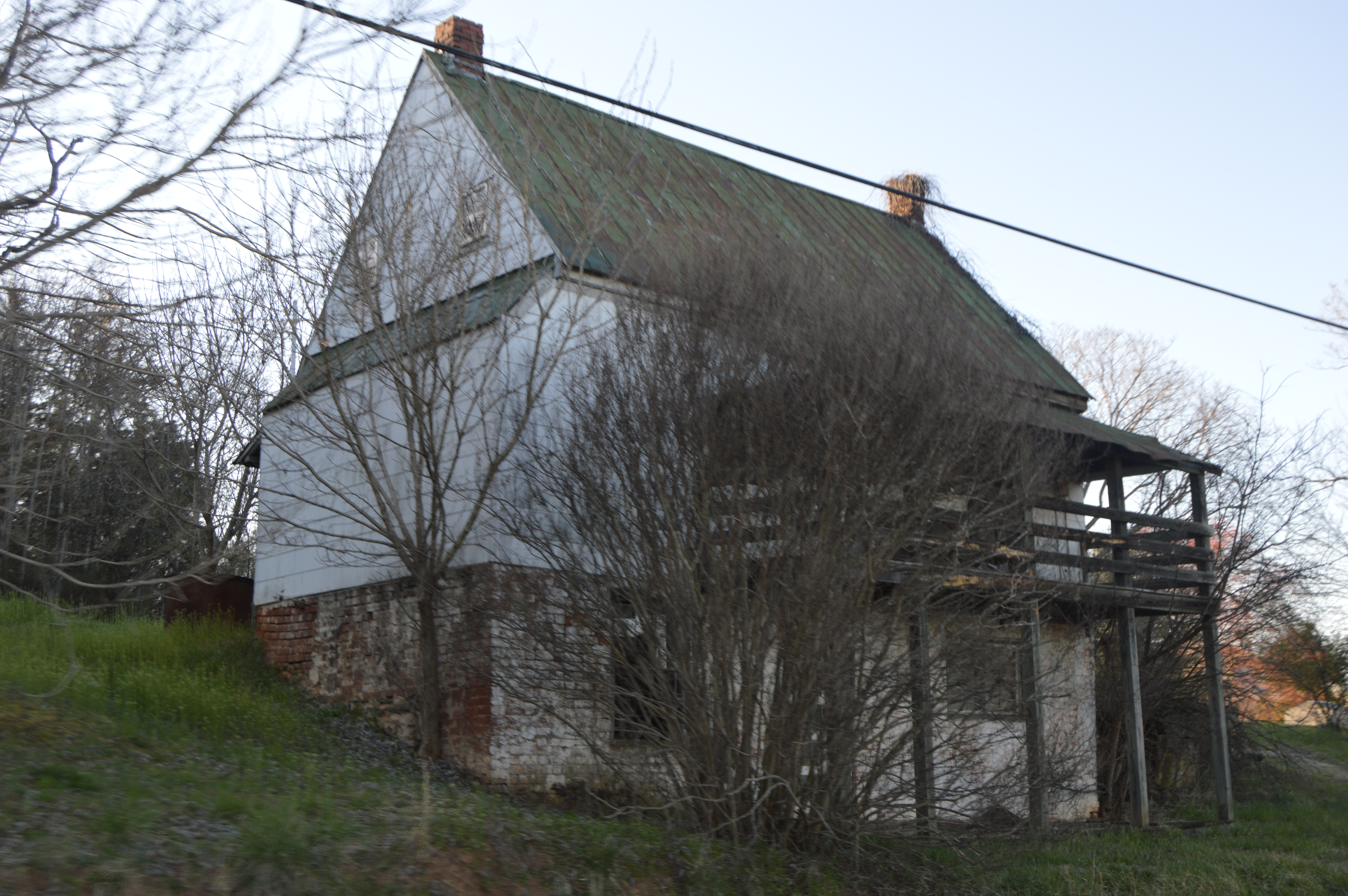
- The Saddlery, c. 1814

- Location within Virginia Location within the United States
- Location: State Route 151 and Fletchers Level Rd., Clifford, Virginia
- Coordinates: 37°38′37″N 79°01′20″W
- Area: 176.02 acres (71.23 ha)
- Built: c. 1772-1961
- Architectural style: Colonial, Federal, Late 19th and early 20th century revivals, Late 19th and early 20th century American movements
- NRHP reference No.: 12000122
- VLR No.: 005-5042

Significant dates
- Added to NRHP: March 12, 2012
- Designated VLR: December 15, 2011

Clifford–New Glasgow Historic District is a national historic district located at Clifford, Amherst County, Virginia. The district encompasses 43 contributing buildings, 6 contributing sites, and 6 contributing structures in the village of Clifford. The district includes a variety of residential, commercial, and institutional buildings built between about 1772 and 1961. Notable buildings include the St. Mark's Episcopal Church (c. 1816), the Saddlery (1814), and the Clifford Ruritan Building (c. 1938). Located in the district and separately listed are Brick House and Winton.

It was listed on the National Register of Historic Places in 2012.
