= Brick House (Clifford, Virginia) =

Historic house in Virginia, United States

- U.S. National Register of Historic Places
- U.S. Historic district – Contributing property
- Virginia Landmarks Register
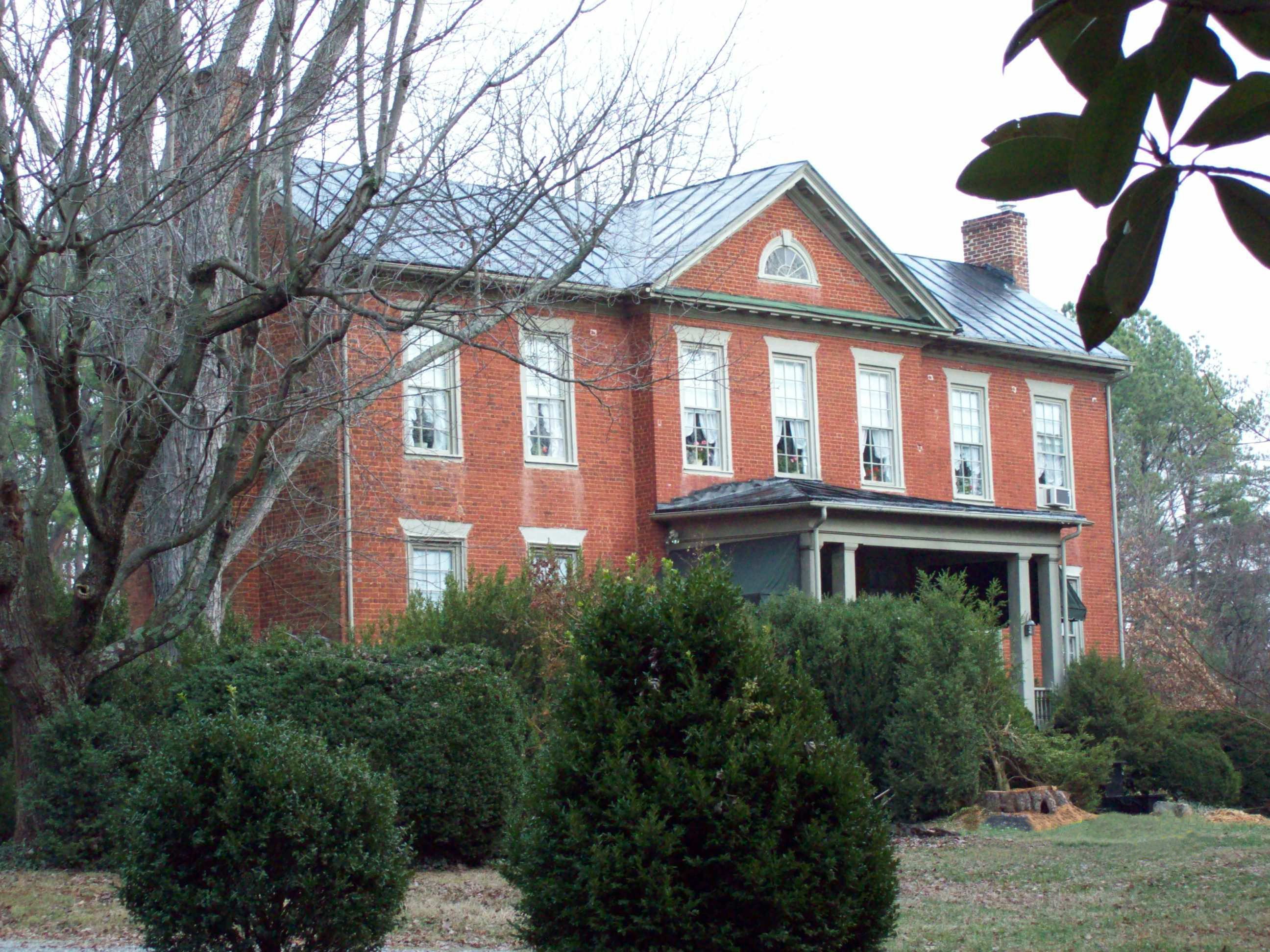
- Brick House, December 2008

- Location within Virginia Location within the United States
- Location: 854 Fletcher's Level Rd., Clifford, Virginia
- Coordinates: 37°38′44″N 79°1′17″W
- Built: 1803
- Architectural style: Federal
- NRHP reference No.: 05001620
- VLR No.: 005-0002

Significant dates
- Added to NRHP: February 1, 2006
- Designated VLR: December 7, 2005

Brick House, also known as Garland House or King David's Palace, is a historic home located in the village of Clifford (formerly, New Glasgow), Amherst County, Virginia. It is a two-story Federal Style, Flemish bond brick house with a projecting pavilion. It was built about 1803 by David Shepherd Garland, later a U.S. Congressman, and measures 65 feet by 44 feet. Two additions were made during the nineteenth century; the first, about 1830, behind the east parlor and the second, about 1850, was adjacent to the dining room and the first addition.

It was listed on the National Register of Historic Places in 2006. It is located in the Clifford-New Glasgow Historic District.
