= Carrsbrook =

Historic house in Virginia, United States

- U.S. National Register of Historic Places
- Virginia Landmarks Register
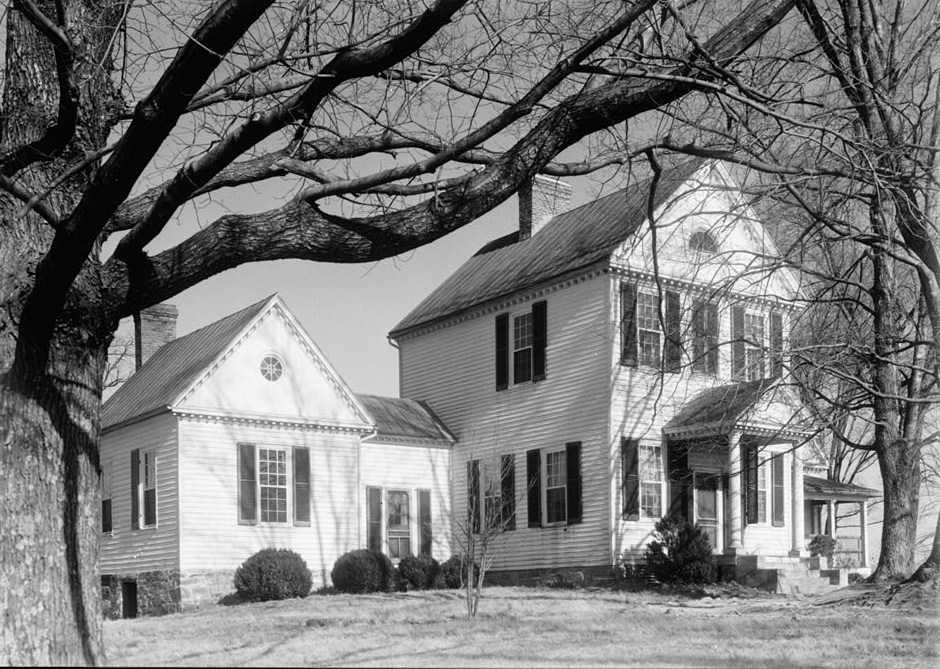
- Carrsbrook, South Fork River vicinity, Charlottesville vicinity (Albemarle County, Virginia).jpg

- Location within Virginia Location within the United States
- Location: VA 1424, near Charlottesville, Virginia
- Coordinates: 38°5′36″N 78°27′19″W
- Area: 4 acres (1.6 ha)
- Built: c. 1785
- Architectural style: Colonial, Palladian
- NRHP reference No.: 82004532
- VLR No.: 002-0011

Significant dates
- Added to NRHP: July 8, 1982
- Designated VLR: July 21, 1981

Carrsbrook is a historic home and farm complex located near Charlottesville, Albemarle County, Virginia. The main house was built about 1785, and is a five-part Palladian style dwelling. It has a central, projecting 2 1/2-story, three-bay-wide section flanked by 1 1/2-story, single-bay wings connected by hyphens. The front facade features a single-story dwarf portico, supported by Doric order columns. From 1798 to 1815 the house served as the residence and school of Thomas Jefferson's ward and nephew, Peter Carr.

It was added to the National Register of Historic Places in 1982.
