= William Waller Hening =

American lawyer and politician (1767–1828)

William Walter Hening

Virginia Executive Council
- In office 1805–1810

Member of the Virginia House of Delegates for Albemarle County, Virginia
- In office December 3, 1804 – December 1805 Serving with Walter Leake
- Preceded by: Peter Carr
- Succeeded by: Hugh Nelson

Personal details
- Born: 1767 Stafford County, Virginia
- Died: April 2, 1828 (aged 60–61) Richmond, Virginia
- Spouse: Agatha Banks
- Children: 5 daughters, 2 sons
- Occupation: attorney, politician, author

William Waller Hening (1767–1828) was a 19th-century attorney, legal scholar, publisher and politician during the formative years of the United States.

== Early life ==
Hening was born in modest circumstances to David Hening and his wife Maria Waller in then-large Stafford County, Virginia, according to various sources around 1750 or 1767.

== Career ==
=== Lawyer and politician ===
In 1789 Hening was admitted to the practice of law in the city of Fredericksburg together with future Supreme Court justice John Marshall and future President James Monroe. Although Fredericksburg was most important town for lawyers in what was then the Northern Neck of Virginia, within five years Hening moved considerably south and west along what had been Virginia's western frontier to Albemarle County, as did James Monroe.

Hening lived in Charlottesville (the Albemarle County seat) on University Street from 1793 until 1805, during which time he began what became a short political career. Charlottesville is now known for associations with Presidents Jefferson, Madison and Monroe, and as discussed below, Jefferson may have been a patron of Hening, as well as a rival in finding and preserving old records in Virginia's earliest counties. In 1795, Hening wrote to Chancellor George Wythe, Jefferson's law teacher, mentor and judge, suggesting that the legislature republish the entire body of the law at public expense, which was not well received. However, with access to Jefferson's library, Hening continued restorating county records that had been destroyed by the British during the Revolutionary War. That effort became his life work and claim to fame as discussed below, especially after his move to Richmond in 1805.

In 1804, Albemarle County voters elected Hening as one of their two representatives in the Virginia House of Delegates. Hening won re-election to that part-time legislative position, but was disqualified because he had been appointed to Virginia's Executive Council. Thus, Revolutionary War veteran Hugh Nelson replaced him as a delegate. President Thomas Jefferson appointed Hening as a Federal Commissioner of Bankruptcy for Virginia.

After moving to Richmond, Hening served on Virginia's executive council for several years or until 1810. He was Deputy Adjutant General (1808–14), thus responsible for coordinating or paying for Virginia's troops during the War of 1812. Hening served as clerk of the Superior Court of Chancery for the Richmond District beginning in 1810 until his death in 1828. The chancery court was responsible for hearing many cases involving slaves, since it handled probate matters (and slaves could be sold to satisfy a decedent's debts, or freed or transferred in a decedent's will), as well as because slaves could not avail themselves of any other court.

Hening himself owned slaves. Federal census records document he owned 6 slaves in 1810 and 16 slaves a decade later.

=== Antiquarian, compiler and editor ===
One author noted Hening as Jefferson's rival in collecting legal documents, but he may be best known for publishing various legal compilations and manuals that were among the most read of his time. His published statutory codifications are routinely cited by historians and genealogists, even if many individual laws were superseded after the American Civil War, as well as later industrialization. Moreover, the rivalry may be overstated, as Jefferson subscribed to Hening's works, as well as allowed Hening to borrow from Jefferson's personal book collection to track down early sources of Virginia law.

=== The New Virginia Justice ===
Hening's first important work was the New Virginia Justice (Richmond, 1795; Sowerby, no. 1971), designed as a handbook for local justices of the peace following the Revised Code of 1794, in the tradition of Webb's Justice and Starke's Justice (1774). Hening may have realized that a new guide for magistrates was need when he was admitted to the bar in 1789. It became a popular authority for lawyers and businessmen and went through four editions in Hening's lifetime. The New Virginia Justice incorporated Virginia laws and forms dating back to the Revolution and included new magistrate duties under federal law. Thomas Jefferson commended the book as "a work of great utility for the public". Although the second printing by a different publishing house mostly omitted the list of 1500 subscribers and with different pagination, the second edition (published in 1810) was revised and improved, and Benjamin Watkins Leigh assisted Hening with the third edition, adapted to the Code of 1819. Although Hening died not long after publication of the fourth edition, another edition filed for copyright in 1844, presumably by another editor although no copy still exists.

=== The Statutes at Large ===
Hening is best known for his important role codifying the law in Virginia. At the time, Virginia was the largest of the original thirteen colonies, which produced four of the first five U.S. Presidents. The Virginia General Assembly authorized Hening's work to allow public access for the first time to all early statutes that had previously only been available in rare publications and abridgments. As such, Hening's work "immediately became, and remains, an essential source for all researchers working on colonial and Revolutionary Virginia history".

Perhaps his most famous work is Hening's edition of The Statutes at Large; being a Collection of all the Laws of Virginia. The well researched 13 volume magnum opus of legal scholarship that codified the Commonwealth of Virginia's laws from 1619–1792, along with an extensive appendix which describes trials and historical events. With Jefferson's encouragement and possible financial aid, Hening spent at least two decades tracking down fugitive session acts, Jefferson warning that unprinted laws are dispersed throughout his printed acts and several of them so decayed that the leaf cannot be opened without disintegrating into powder. The 13 volumes are cited collectively as William Waller Hening, The Statutes at Large; Being a Collection of All the Laws of Virginia, from the first session of the Legislature in the year 1619, 13 vols. (Richmond, Philadelphia, and New York, 1809-1823). After Hening's death, others published Shepherd's Continuation of Hening (1835 and 1836), and Genealogists published Casey's Index (1896) of personal names in the Hening and Shepherd volumes.

=== Other legal works and comparisons ===
Between 1794 and 1826 Hening also published one scholarly or legal publication per year, on average, making him the most prolific legal writer of his time. Hening claimed to be collecting materials on pleading for three decades, and published volume one of The American Pleader and Lawyers Guide in New York in 1811 and volume two in Richmond in 1826, but died before completing his proposed third volume. Other popular text writers of the era were Everard Hall, Joseph Tate, John Robinson and Thomas Cooper (whom Jefferson had selected as the first law professor of the University of Virginia).

Hening also published American editions (bound together and separately) of English works on legal maxims and precedents: Francis' Maxims in Equity (1823), Branch's Maxims (1824), and the second American Edition of Noy's Grounds and Maxims of the Laws of England. Perhaps the closest compariton is to Blackstone (1803), with notes and appendices by future federal judge and law professor St. George Tucker of Williamsburg published

Between 1808 and 1811 Hening also published four volumes of court reports in collaboration with William Munford (including the first advance sheet system in Virginia). Comparable reporters of judicial decision in the era were Daniel Call reporter judges Bushrod Washington and George WyteDuring this period, Hening

== Personal life ==
Hening married Agatha Banks, who had five daughters. Only Maria Waller Hening (1794-1861) did not marry. The eldest and longest surviving daughter was Anna Matilda Hening Cabanis (1793-1873) who married and survived the clerk of the Williamsburg, Virginia court. Her youngest sister also was the first to die after their parents' death: Virginia Hening Abbot (1803-1830) married a Quaker and died in childbirth in Williamsburg. Betsy Hening Spotswood Schermerhorn (1798-1873) married twice and like both her husbands died in Indiana. Another middle sister, Martha (1807-1852) married Jefferson Swann of Powhatan County. Of their two brothers, William Henry Hening (1791-1848) fought in the War of 1812 after which he moved to Powhatan County, and Rev. Edmund Hening (1810-1884) married three times, died in Philadelphia and left a son Crawford Dawes Hening (1866-1944). C.D. Hening continued his grandfather's tradition in part by becoming the reporter for the New Hampshire Supreme Court, legal textbook author and professor of law at the University of Pennsylvania.

== Death and legacy ==
Hening died in Richmond on April 2, 1828. His great-grandsons fought on opposite sides in the American Civil War, including Confederate private James W. Hening of the 5th Virginia infantry, Major Hening fought for an Indiana regiment of federal troops.
