= Winton (Clifford, Virginia) =

Historic house in Virginia, United States

- U.S. National Register of Historic Places
- U.S. Historic district – Contributing property
- Virginia Landmarks Register
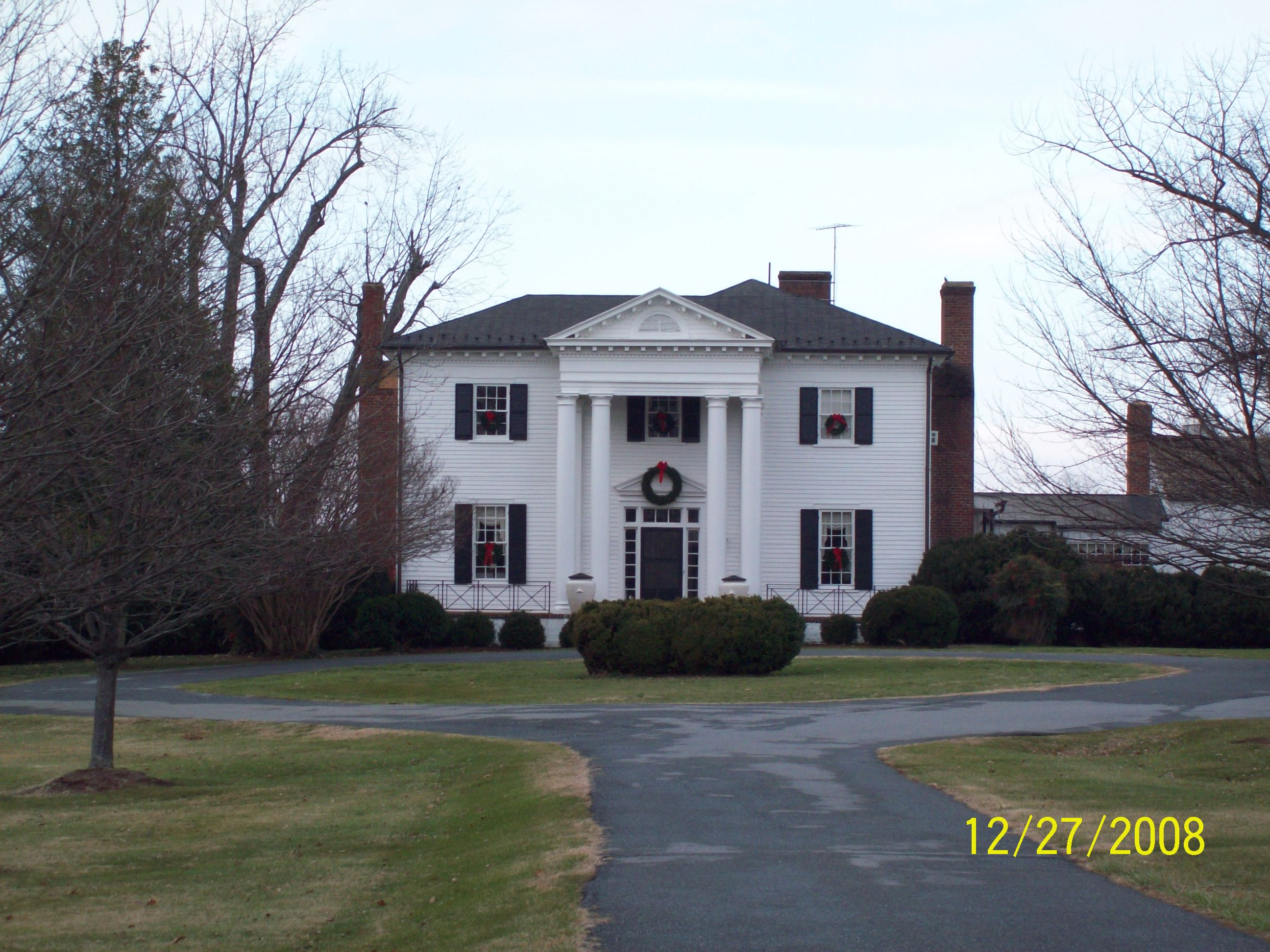
- Winton, December 2008

- Location within Virginia Location within the United States
- Location: W of VA 151, Clifford, Virginia
- Coordinates: 37°38′24″N 79°1′40″W
- Built: 1770
- Architectural style: Georgian
- NRHP reference No.: 74002104
- VLR No.: 005-0021

Significant dates
- Added to NRHP: May 2, 1974
- Designated VLR: November 20, 1973

Winton is a historic home located at Clifford, Amherst County, Virginia. It is a two-story, late-Georgian, frame structure with three bays on the main facade, several additions to the rear, and a prominent two-story portico. It is said to have been built by Colonel Joseph Cabell (1732-1798) in about 1770, who sold Winton to his friend Colonel Samuel Meredith, Jr. in 1779. He was a close friend of his near neighbor Patrick Henry, and married Patrick's sister, Jane Henry. Patrick Henry's mother, Sarah Winston Syme Henry, lived at Winton and is buried in the cemetery on the grounds. In 1967, an anonymous donor gave it to the County of Amherst to be leased to a corporation and run as a country club.

It was listed on the National Register of Historic Places in 1974. It is located in the Clifford-New Glasgow Historic District.

== Gallery ==
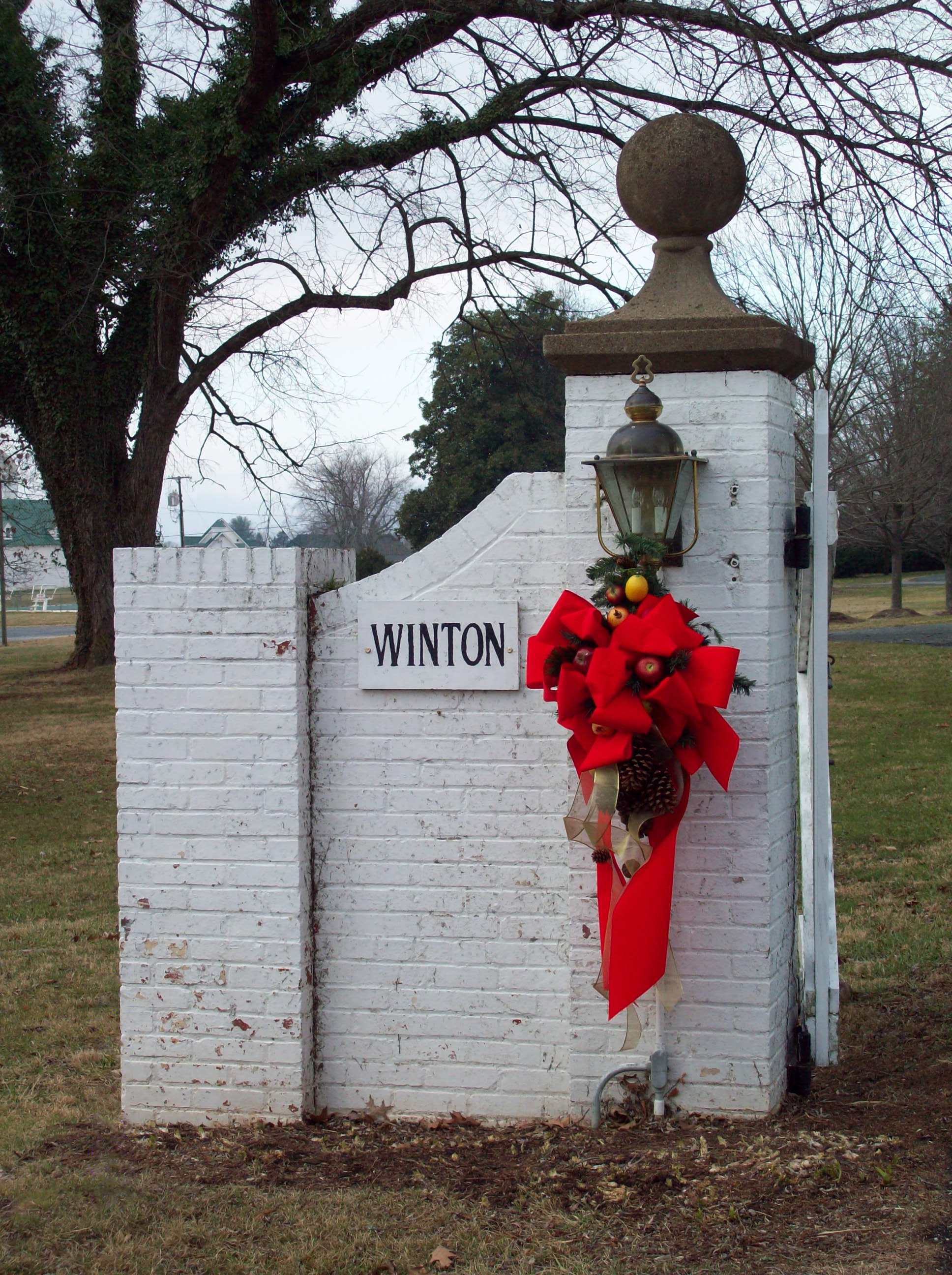
Winton Entry Gate, Clifford, Va., December 2008
