= Dabney Carr =

American judge

Justice of the Virginia Supreme Court
- In office February 24, 1824 – January 8, 1837

Personal details
- Born: April 27, 1773 Goochland County, Virginia
- Died: January 8, 1837 (aged 63) Richmond, Virginia
- Spouse: Elizabeth Carr
- Relatives: Thomas Jefferson (uncle); Peter Carr (brother); Samuel Carr (brother); Dabney S. Carr (nephew)
- Education: Hampden-Sydney College
- Profession: Lawyer, writer, judge

Dabney Carr (April 27, 1773 – January 8, 1837) was a Virginia lawyer, writer and a justice of the Virginia Supreme Court of Appeals.

== Early and family life ==
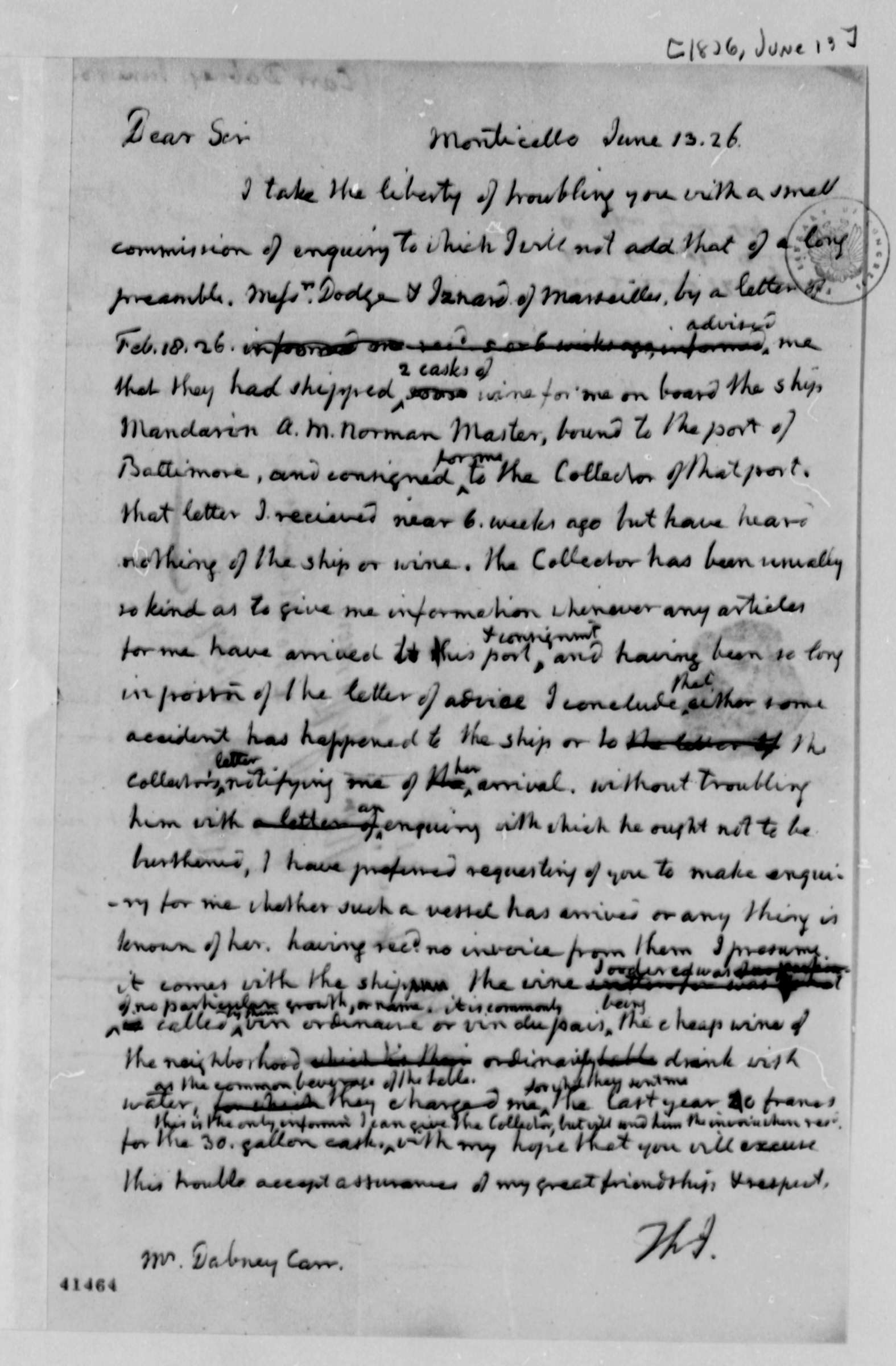
Letter from Thomas Jefferson to Dabney Carr, 1826. Library of Congress

Martha Jefferson Carr gave birth to this Dabney Carr at Spring Forest, a Goochland County, Virginia, plantation just three weeks before the death of his father, also named Dabney Carr. The Carrs were descended from Thomas Carr who represented King William County in the House of Burgesses and invested in real estate to the west, then moved to what became Caroline County. There his son (also Thomas) held various local offices, and his grandson Dabney (this man's father) began a near life-long close friendship with Thomas Jefferson and seemed to begin a promising political career before an early death. His mother was Jefferson's sister and initially tried to raise her three young sons and three young daughters at her former husband's plantation, but moved her family to Monticello by 1781. His elder brothers Peter Carr (who served in the Virginia General Assembly) and Samuel Carr (who served in the War of 1812 as well as the Maryland House of Delegates and both houses of the Virginia General Assembly) received posthumous notoriety as possible fathers of Sally Hemings's children. Jefferson took an active role in guiding and educating this fatherless nephew, as would his friend James Madison while Jefferson was pursuing diplomatic duties in France.

The younger Carr attended Hampden-Sydney College from 1786 to 1789 and returned home to study law with William Wirt, who was just one year older. The two men (and Francis Walker Gilmer, another Jefferson correspondent) remained friends for the rest of their lives. An extensive collection of their letters can be found in the Manuscripts Department, Library of the University of North Carolina at Chapel Hill.

== Career ==
Carr started his private legal practice in Albemarle and adjoining counties in 1796. In 1802 Albemarle voters elected him commonwealth's attorney (prosecutor), and Carr served for a decade, winning re-election several times. In March 1811 he resigned to become an interim judge when William H. Cabell was elevated to what was later known as the Virginia Supreme Court (and on which Carr would also later serve). Although Virginia's legislature ended up electing another man to fill that judicial vacancy, it created a new district court for chancery matters, and elected Carr as Chancellor for the Winchester District in January 1812, so he moved to Winchester. Meanwhile, Carr published several articles on non-legal topics. Using the pseudonym "Obediah Squaretoes," Carr contributed a satirical article to his friend William Wirt's The Old Bachelor (1814). The Library of Virginia has correspondence between Wirt and Carr, including their discussions of the War of 1812 and varied legal careers.

On February 24, 1824, Virginia legislators elected Carr a judge of the Supreme Court of Appeals. He moved to the outskirts of Richmond and held this office until his death. In April 1825 he declined Jefferson's offer to become a professor of law at the University of Virginia, believing himself unqualified to teach. Judge Car became known as hardworking, as well as somewhat eccentric for the long walks he favored on a physician's recommendation, particularly because his exercise also involved flinging his arms.

Although Carr owned no slaves in the 1800 census and only 5 slaves in 1810, in the 1820 census (before his daughters married), Carr owned 22 slaves and his household also included 8 other white people. In the 1830 census, Judge Carr owned 5 slaves.

== Personal life ==
This Dabney Carr married his paternal cousin, Elizabeth Carr (daughter of Maryland planter and relative Overton Carr), in June 1802. Three years later, his somewhat elder brother Samuel married Elizabeth's sister (who would die about a decade later, and her husband remarried). Although both this man's sons died young (Dabney Jefferson Carr at age 9), their daughters Nancy Addison Conrad (1803-1868) and Jane Cary Henderson (1807-1859) would marry and have children. Notwithstanding the satirical essay discussed above), Carr educated his daughters.

== Death and legacy ==
Judge Dabney Carr died at his home on January 8, 1837, and is interred in Richmond's Shockoe Hill Cemetery. His nephew, Dabney Smith Carr (1802-1854), was a newspaper publisher in Baltimore, Maryland and later U.S. Minister to the Ottoman Empire (1843–49) before moving back to Albemarle County, Virginia. Judge Carr did not live to see six of his daughters' sons fight for the Confederate States of America, although several of their names honored him and his closest friends. Holmes and Tucker Conrad, as well as Peyton Randolph Harrison of the 2nd Virginia Infantry both died at the First Battle of Manassas. Captain Dabney Carr Harrison of the 56th Virginia Infantry died at the Battle of Fort Donelson and Capt. Randolph Harrison also died during the conflict, although Capt. William Wirt Harrison would survive his wounds and Dr. Henry St. George Tucker Harrison was too young to enlist.
