= Hugh Nelson (Virginia politician) =

American politician (1768–1836)

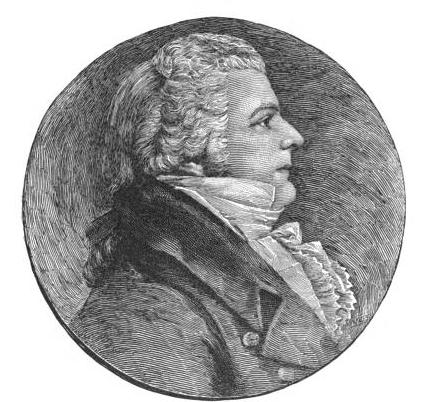

6th United States Minister to Spain
- In office December 4, 1823 – July 23, 1824
- Appointed by: James Monroe
- Preceded by: John Forsyth
- Succeeded by: Alexander Hill Everett

Chair of the House Judiciary Committee
- In office March 4, 1815 – March 3, 1819
- Preceded by: Charles J. Ingersoll
- Succeeded by: John Sergeant
- In office 1822 – March 3, 1822
- Preceded by: John Sergeant
- Succeeded by: Daniel Webster

Member of the U.S. House of Representatives from Virginia
- In office March 4, 1811 – January 14, 1823
- Preceded by: David S. Garland
- Succeeded by: Alexander Smyth
- Constituency: 21st district (1811-1813); 22nd district (1813-1823)

13th Speaker of the Virginia House of Delegates
- In office 1807–1809
- Preceded by: Peter Johnston Jr.
- Succeeded by: James Barbour

Member of the Virginia House of Delegates from the Albemarle district
- In office 1805 – 1809; Alongside Joel Yancey, Walter Leake, Peter Carr, Rice Garland
- Preceded by: William Waller Hening
- Succeeded by: Tucker Coles; William D Meriwether
- In office 1828 – 1829; Alongside John P Drummond, William F. Gordon
- Preceded by: Albert Allmand; Charles Cocke
- Succeeded by: Thomas Walker Gilmer; Rice W Wood

Member of the Virginia Senate from the Elizabeth City, Warwick and York district
- In office 1786–1791
- Preceded by: William Lee
- Succeeded by: Richard Cary Jr

Personal details
- Born: Hugh Nelson; September 30, 1768 Yorktown, Virginia Colony, British America
- Died: March 18, 1836 (aged 67) Albemarle County, Virginia, U.S.
- Resting place: Cismont, Virginia
- Party: Democratic-Republican
- Spouse: Eliza Kinloch
- Parent(s): Thomas Nelson Jr. (father); Lucy Grymes (mother)
- Education: College of William & Mary

Hugh Nelson (September 30, 1768 – March 18, 1836) was an American politician and U.S. representative from Virginia.

== Early and family life ==
Nelson was born in Yorktown in the Colony of Virginia, to the former Lucy Grymes (1743-1830) and her husband, the future general and governor Thomas Nelson Jr. This Nelson could trace his descent from the First Families of Virginia. His paternal grandfather, William Nelson, served in both houses of the Virginia General Assembly, and operated a successful mercantile business and plantations. His maternal grandfather also served as a burgess.

Hugh Nelson graduated from the College of William and Mary in Williamsburg, Virginia, in 1780, although his father suffered severe financial difficulties after the American Revolutionary War. The final battle, the Siege of Yorktown, was over land that his great-grandfather had developed, and many buildings and cultivated (or over-cultivated) were destroyed or lost value. Somewhat complicating matters, his uncle, Col. Hugh Nelson (1749–1799), also distinguished himself during the war, then became a delegate representing Fauquier County.

== Career ==
Following the American Revolutionary War, Nelson was elected to the Senate of Virginia (1786–1791), representing (pert time) a district including the former colonial capital, Williamsburg and James City and York Counties, including many plantations devastated in the war's last campaign, the Siege of Yorktown.

He moved westward to Albemarle County, and voters there elected him as one of their representatives (part time) in the Virginia House of Delegates 1805–1809 and again in 1828–1829. He was speaker of the latter house from 1807 to 1809. Nelson also served as judge of the general court.

Nelson was a presidential elector in 1808.

He was elected as a Democratic-Republican to the Twelfth and to the five succeeding Congresses, and served from March 4, 1811, until his resignation on January 14, 1823, having received an appointment in the diplomatic service. He served as chairman of the Committee on the Judiciary (Fourteenth, Fifteenth, and Seventeenth Congresses). Nelson was appointed by President James Monroe as United States Minister to Spain on January 15, 1823, and served until November 23, 1824.

== Death and legacy ==
Nelson died at his home, "Belvoir," in Albemarle County, Virginia, on March 18, 1836. He was interred in Belvoir Cemetery in Cismont, Virginia.

== Sources ==
- United States Congress. "Hugh Nelson (id: N000035)". Biographical Directory of the United States Congress.

U.S. House of Representatives
Preceded by David S. Garland	Member of the U.S. House of Representatives from Virginia's 21st congressional district March 4, 1811 - March 3, 1813	Succeeded by Thomas Newton, Jr.
Diplomatic posts
Preceded by John Forsyth	United States Minister to Spain; 1823–1824	Succeeded by Alexander Hill Everett
