= Clifford, Virginia =

Unincorporated community in Virginia, United States

- Unincorporated community
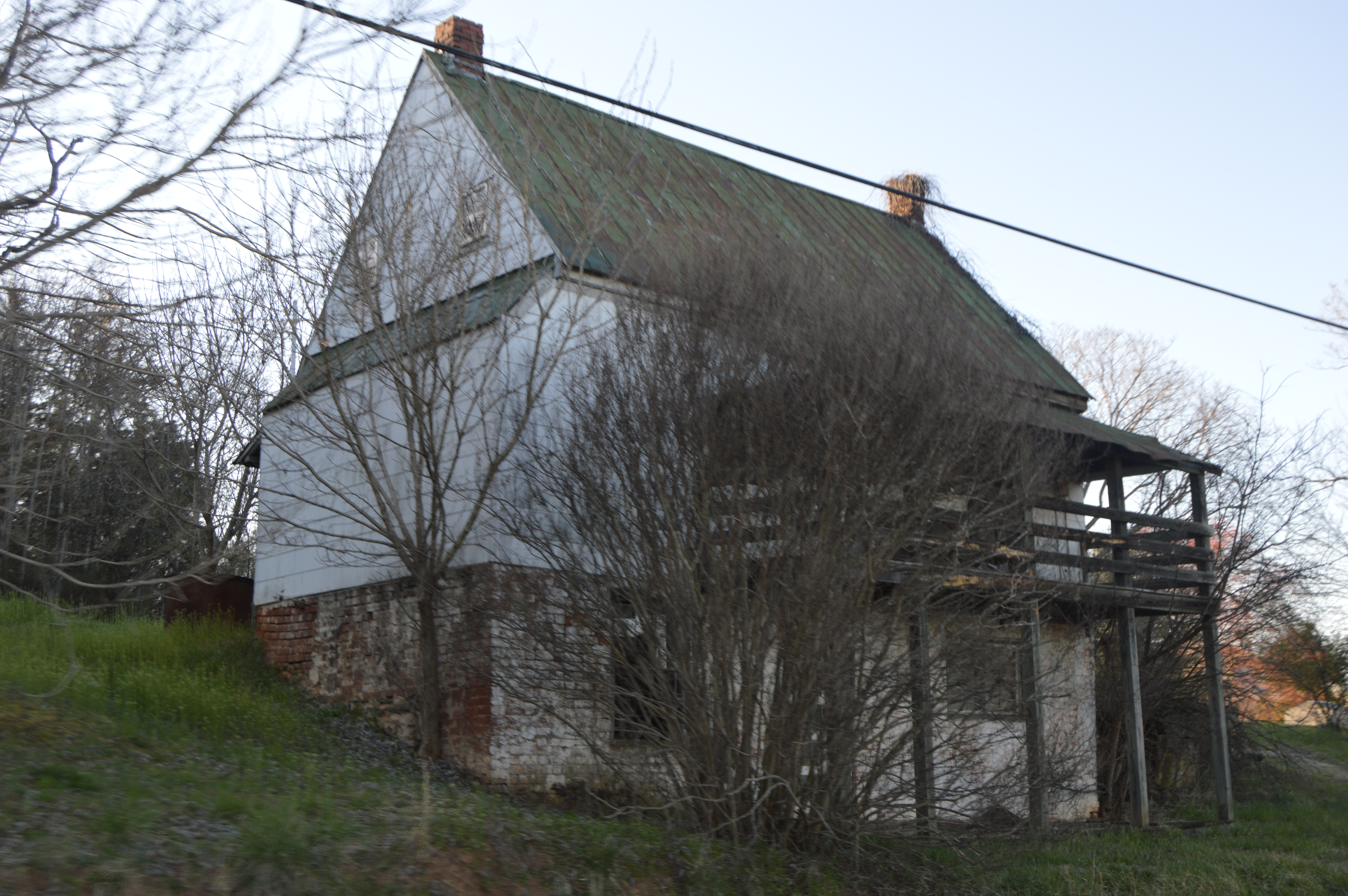
- The Saddlery, built 1814 and part of the Clifford-New Glasgow Historic District

- Location within Virginia Location within the United States
- Coordinates: 37°38′37″N 79°01′20″W
- Country: United States
- State: Virginia
- County: Amherst
- Elevation: 778 ft (237 m)
- Time zone: UTC-5 (Eastern (EST))
  - Summer (DST): UTC-4 (EDT)
- ZIP code: 24533
- Area code: 434
- GNIS feature ID: 1482575

Clifford (formerly New Glasgow) is an unincorporated community in Amherst County, Virginia, United States. Clifford is located on Virginia State Route 151, 4.3 miles (6.9 km) north-northeast of Amherst. Clifford has a post office with ZIP code 24533, which opened on March 23, 1883. Five sites in the vicinity of Clifford are listed on the National Register of Historic Places: Brick House, Clifford-New Glasgow Historic District, Geddes, Mountain View Farm, and Winton.
