= Dabney Carr (Virginia assemblyman) =

American assemblyman

Member of the House of Burgesses from Louisa County, Virginia
- In office 1772 – May 16, 1773 Serving with Richard Anderson
- Preceded by: Thomas Johnson
- Succeeded by: Thomas Johnson

Personal details
- Born: October 26, 1743 Louisa County, Virginia
- Died: May 16, 1773 (aged 29) Shadwell, British America
- Resting place: Monticello, Virginia
- Spouse: Martha Jefferson (m. 1765)
- Children: Jane Barbara Cary (daughter); Lucy Terrell (daughter); Mary (Polly) Carr (daughter); Peter Carr (son); Samuel Carr (son); Dabney Carr (son)
- Relatives: Thomas Jefferson (brother-in-law)
- Occupation: Planter, politician, lawyer

Dabney Carr (October 26, 1743 – May 16, 1773) was a Virginia lawyer and militiaman who served a partial term in the House of Burgesses shortly before the American Revolutionary War. He is known for his friendship since boyhood with Thomas Jefferson and as the husband of Martha Jefferson, Thomas' younger sister. Carr introduced the Committee of correspondence in Virginia, which after his early death became a leading factor in formation of the Continental Congress. Pursuant to a boyhood pact, Jefferson buried Carr on Jefferson's Monticello estate in a newly created graveyard under a particular tree, and also helped oversee the upbringing of Carr's children, including politicians Peter and Samuel Carr and Judge Dabney Carr.

== Early life and education ==
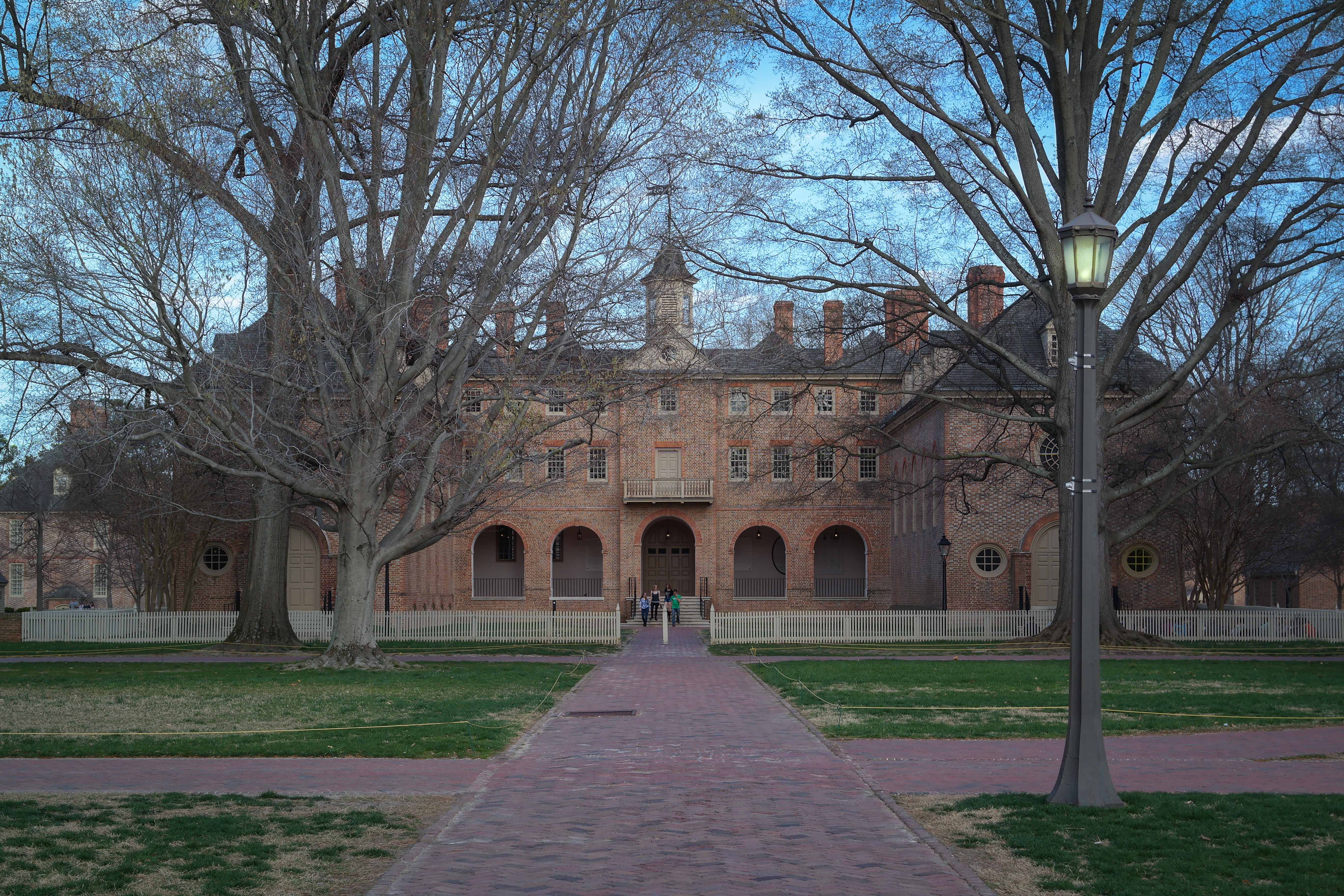
Wren Building, College of William & Mary. With a construction history dating back to 1695, it is part of the college's ancient campus.

Carr was born on October 26, 1743, to planter John Carr (1706–1778) and his second wife, Barbara Overton Carr (died 1794), daughter of Captain James and Elizabeth Overton. The first of John Carr's sons to survive until adulthood was born at Bear Castle, a large farm in Louisa County, Virginia. His planter father John, who attained the title of Colonel, also served as a justice of the peace and sheriff in Louisa County, and provided provisions to the patriot forces as the American Revolutionary War began not long after this man's death. Carr descended from early settlers and men who performed public service and had large landholdings throughout Virginia. His grandfather, Major Thomas Carr (1678-1738) had emigrated from England and developed a plantation in what became Caroline County (but was then King William County, which that Carr represented for a term in the House of Burgesses), as well as acquired lands to the west which his progeny would develop. Dabney had an older half-brother, Thomas who died not long after this boy's birth. His full siblings who reached adulthood were Samuel, Overton, Garland, Mary (who married cousin John Minor of Albemarle County), and Elizabeth.

Educated at Rev. James Maury's School, a private boarding school conducted in a log cabin in nearby Albemarle County, Carr's classmates included Thomas Jefferson. Maury also taught James Madison and James Monroe (thus three of the country's future presidents) and two more future signers of the United States Declaration of Independence. In addition to reading and writing, pupils learned geography, history, mathematics, literature, classics, manners, and morals. Both Jefferson and Carr then traveled to the colony's capital, Williamsburg to study law at College of William & Mary. During his education, Carr also befriended John Taylor and James Madison.

During breaks from classes, Carr often traveled to Jefferson's home, Shadwell, on weekends, where he also grew close to two of Jefferson's sisters, Martha and Jane. The young men often rode horses through what they called "Tom's mountain", on the estate later renamed Monticello.

== Marriage and children ==
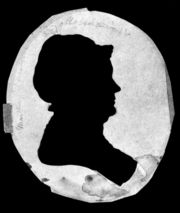
Martha Jefferson Carr (May 29, 1746 - September 3, 1811)

Carr married Jefferson's younger sister, Martha Jefferson (May 29, 1746 - September 3, 1811), on July 20, 1765, and they lived in Goochland County at his plantation, Spring Forest.

Their children were:

- Jane Barbara Carr (1766-1840) also sometimes referred to as Jean or Jenny married Wilson Cary (1760-1793)
- Lucy Carr (March 7, 1768 – 1803) m. Richard Terrell (died 1802) on 5 October 1792
- Mary (Polly) Carr (born March 7, 1768), twin sister of Lucy, never married
- Peter Carr (1770-1815) m. Hetty Smith (1767-1834)
- Colonel Samuel Carr of Dunlora (October 8, 1771 – 1855) married first Eleanor B. Carr (died 1815), and then married Maria Dabney
- Judge Dabney Carr (1773-1837) married Elizabeth Carr

Impressed with the Carr's family life, Jefferson wrote, "...in a very small house, with a table, half a dozen chairs, and one or two servants... [Dabney] is the happiest man in the universe. Every incident in life he so takes as to render it a source of pleasure, with as much benevolence as the heart of a man will hold, but with an utter neglect of the costly apparatus of life, he exhibits to the world a new phenomenon in philosophy—the Samian sage in the tab of the cynic."

In 1784, when Jefferson was leaving for Paris, he wrote to James Madison to entrust the education of Peter Carr, Dabney's oldest son, to him, saying "... it is the son of my friend, the dearest friend I know, who, had fate reversed our lots, would have been a father to my children."

== Career ==
As a young man, in 1763, Carr served in French and Indian War in the Volunteer Rangers under Captain Phillips and received a land bounty for his service. After completing his education, Carr practiced law in Louisa, Goochland, Albemarle, Chesterfield, and Augusta Counties of Virginia. Patrick Henry considered Carr his greatest competitor as a lawyer.

In 1771, Louisa County voters elected Carr to the Virginia House of Burgesses and re-elected him in 1772, but he failed to complete that term due to his death. Relations between the colonists and the King of England were contentious by 1773 and a special session of the House of Burgesses was held by John Murray, Lord Dunmore, the governor of Virginia. On March 12, 1773, Carr proposed the creation of an inter-colony Committee of correspondence to help coordinate communication between Virginia and other colonies. He made a "forceful and eloquent speech" before the other members and the plan was adopted. The next day, a standing committee, which included Carr, began corresponding with other colonies. This became a factor in creating the Continental Congress in 1774.

== Death ==
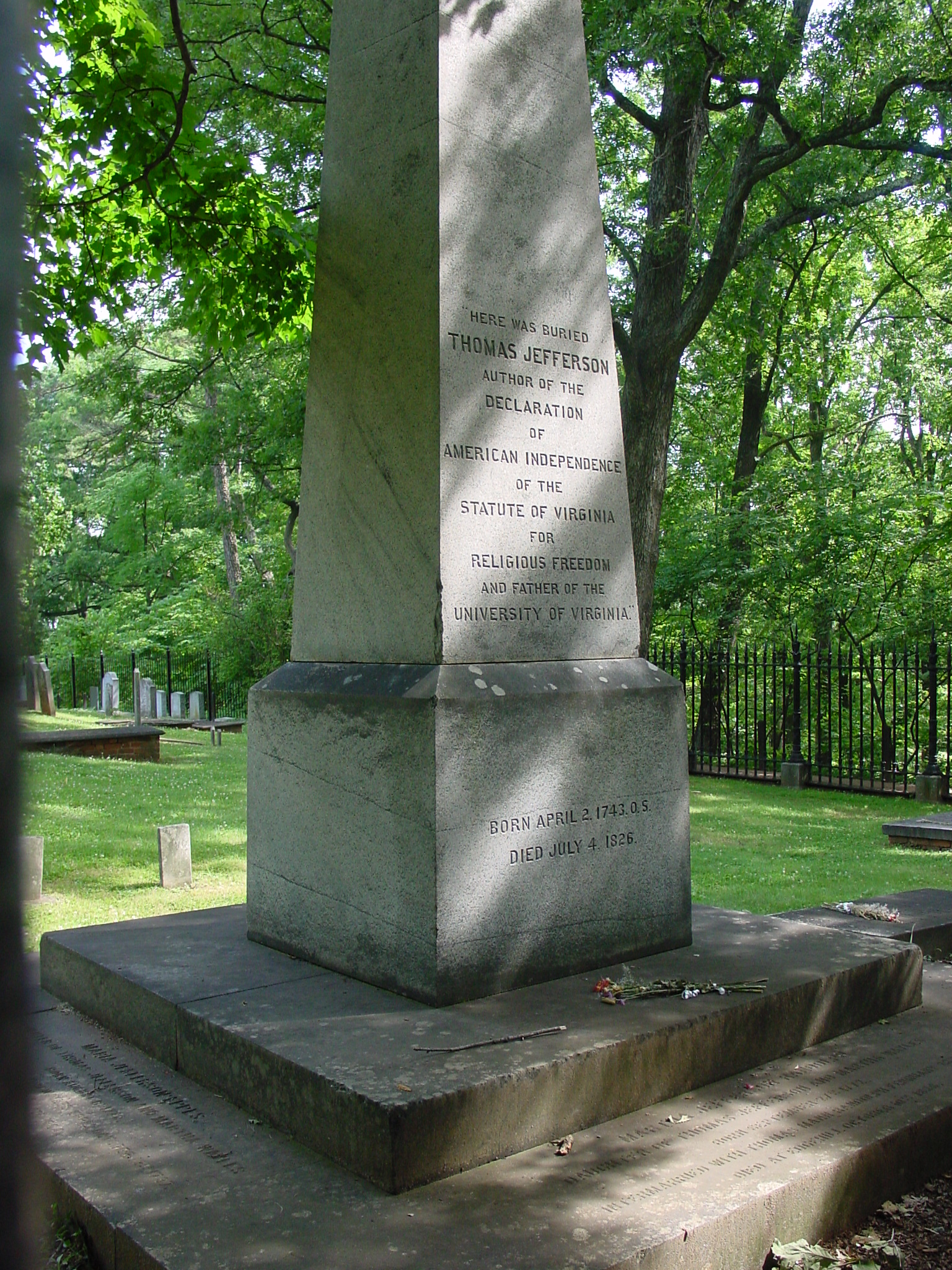
Thomas Jefferson's gravesite, alongside which Dabney Carr was buried. As boys, Thomas Jefferson and Dabney Carr hiked up the summit of the mountain near Jefferson's parents’ Shadwell plantation. They sat for hours under an oak tree on the land that would later become the Monticello estate, reading and planning their futures. They made a pact that they would be buried under that oak tree.

Carr died of a fever on May 16, 1773, at one of Jefferson's plantations but while Jefferson was away a few weeks after the birth of his sixth child, Dabney Carr. Pursuant to a boyhood promise, Jefferson buried Carr on the grounds of Monticello, the first person to be buried there, (Note: Carr died while Jefferson was out of town. It is believed that Carr probably died at Shadwell and was buried there initially. Family tradition holds that when Jefferson returned on May 21, 1773, he had Carr buried at Monticello on or after May 22, when Jefferson had the land cleared for the graveyard. Carr's was the first body to be buried there.) and ultimately next to Jefferson. His grave marker notes that Jefferson "of all men, loved him most."

"The number of his friends and the warmth of their affection were proofs of his worth and of their estimate of it..."

— Thomas Jefferson on Dabney Carr

At the time of Carr's death and Martha's widowhood, their children ranged in age from three weeks (Dabney) to six years (Jane). Jefferson helped Carr's widow raise these children, including overseeing their education. Martha, who became known as "Aunt Carr," and her children were often at Monticello. She was an active presence there, particularly after the death of Jefferson's wife, Martha. She was described as "a gifted woman, and every way worthy of her husband; and their married life was one of peculiar felicity." After what Thomas Jefferson described as "wasting complaint which has for two or three years been gaining upon her," Martha Jefferson Carr died in September 1811 and was buried at the Monticello family graveyard next to her husband and the obelisk for Jefferson.
