= Dabney S. Carr =

American diplomat

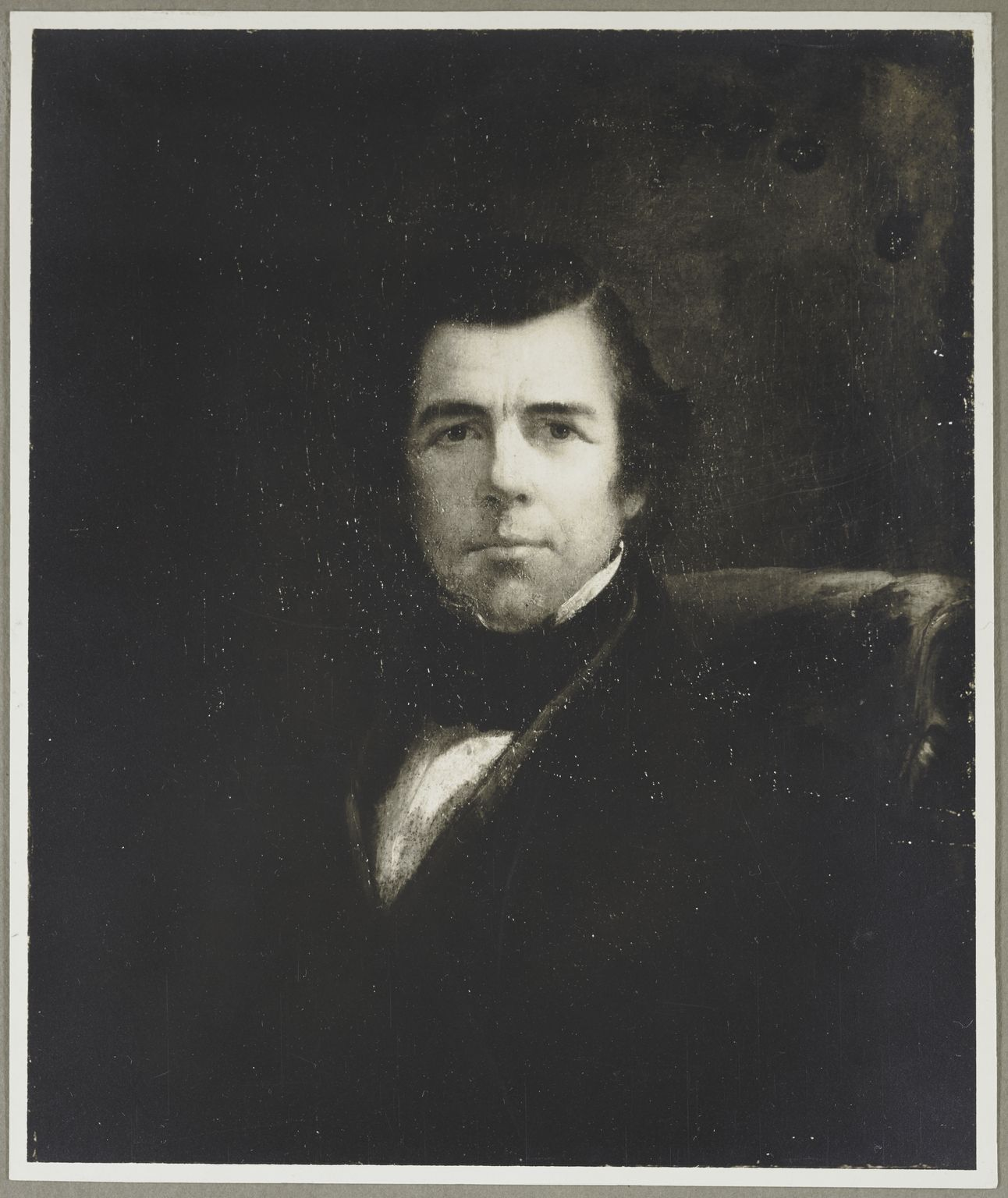
- Official portrait, 1844

United States Minister Resident to the Ottoman Empire
- In office February 29, 1844 – October 20, 1849
- President: James K. Polk; Zachary Taylor
- Preceded by: David Porter
- Succeeded by: George Perkins Marsh

Personal details
- Born: March 5, 1802
- Died: March 24, 1854 (aged 52)
- Relatives: Thomas Jefferson (great-uncle)

Dabney Smith Carr (March 5, 1802 – March 24, 1854) was an American newspaper publisher and diplomat who served as the United States minister to the Ottoman Empire from 1844 to 1849. During his tenure as minister he closed consular generals across the Ottoman Empire and feuded with Warder Cresson.

== Early life ==
Dabney Smith Carr was the grand-nephew of Thomas Jefferson. Carr married Sidney S. Nicholas, the daughter of Governor Wilson Cary Nicholas.

== Career ==
Carr moved to Baltimore, where he was the editor of the Baltimore Republican. His newspaper supported Andrew Jackson during the 1828 presidential election. Jackson appointed Carr to replace William Bedford Barney, who had served in the role since 1818, as naval officer of the port of Baltimore.

David Porter, the American minister to the Ottoman Empire, died in office. President James K. Polk appointed Carr to replace him on October 6, 1843. The United States Senate confirmed his nomination on January 12, 1844. He presented his credentials on February 29, 1844, and held the position until October 20, 1849.

Carr stated that Warder Cresson, the American consular to Jerusalem, was a "religious maniac" and "madman". He later told the Sublime Porte that he disavowed Cresson. In 1849, he closed the consular agencies in Damascus, Acre, Nazareth, and Ramla stating that they were useless.

== Later life ==
Carr died in Charlottesville, Virginia, on March 24, 1854. After Carr's death his widow acquired Carr's Hill, which she was already living in, from Thomas Jefferson Randolph.

== Works cited ==
=== Books ===
- Obituary Record of Graduates of Yale College: Deceased during the Academical year ending in June 1886. Tuttle, Morehouse & Taylor. 1886.
- Feller, Daniel; Moser, Harold; Moss, Laura-Eve; Coens, Thomas, eds. (2007). The Papers of Andrew Jackson. Vol. 7. University of Tennessee Press. ISBN 9781572335936.
- Kark, Ruth (1994). American Consuls in the Holy Land: 1832-1914. Magnes Press. ISBN 0814325238.

=== Journals ===
- Semmes, Raphael (1945). "Vignettes of Maryland History: Part II". Maryland Historical Magazine. 15 (1). Maryland Center for History and Culture: 27–48.

=== News ===
- Gard, Richard (2020). "Carr's Hill reopens". Virginia. Archived from the original on June 19, 2025.

=== Newspapers ===
- "Dabney S. Carr". The Times-Picayune. April 6, 1854. p. 2 – via Newspapers.com.
- "Death of a Well-Known Man". Richmond Dispatch. March 29, 1854. p. 3 – via Newspapers.com.
- "Diplomatic". Weekly Register. January 13, 1844. p. 1 – via Newspapers.com.

=== Web ===
- "Before 1906: Jefferson and the 1800's [sic]". University of Virginia. Archived from the original on March 22, 2025.
- "Former Ambassadors". U.S. Embassy and Consulates in Turkey. Archived from the original on July 8, 2018.
