= Amherst County, Virginia =

County in Virginia, United States

- County
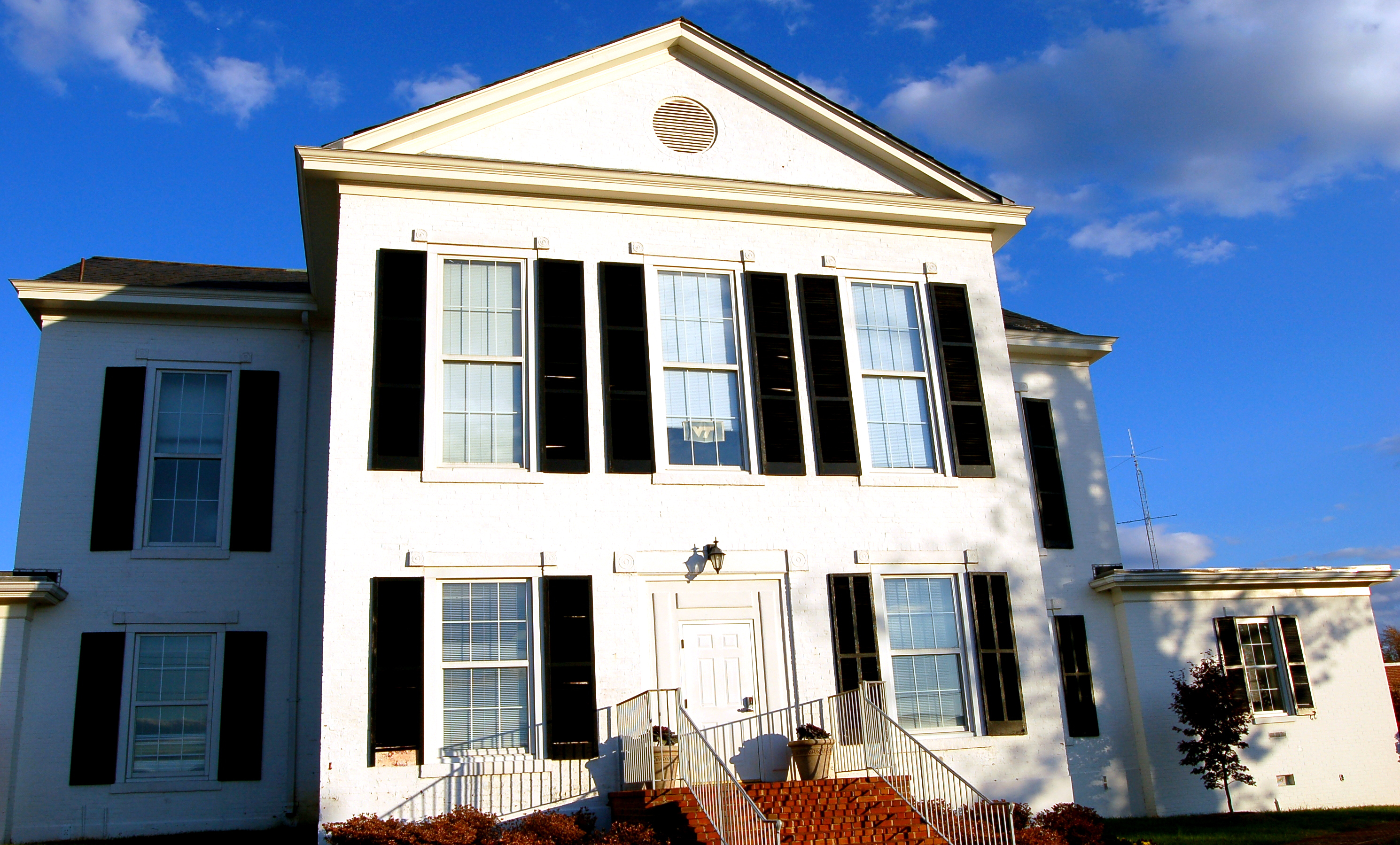
- Amherst County Courthouse

- Flag Seal Logo

- Location within the U.S. state of Virginia
- Coordinates: 37.61°N 79.14°W
- Country: United States
- State: Virginia
- Founded: 1761
- Named for: Jeffery Amherst
- Seat: Amherst
- Largest town: Amherst

Area
  - Total: 479 sq mi (1,240 km^{2})
  - Land: 474 sq mi (1,230 km^{2})
  - Water: 4.9 sq mi (13 km^{2}) 1.0%

Population (2020)
  - Total: 31,307
  - Estimate (2025): 31,962 ▲
  - Density: 66.05/sq mi (25.50/km^{2})
- Time zone: UTC−5 (Eastern)
  - Summer (DST): UTC−4 (EDT)
- Congressional district: 5th
- Website: www.countyofamherst.com

Amherst County is located in the Piedmont region, near the center of the Commonwealth of Virginia in the United States. The county is part of the Lynchburg metropolitan area, and its county seat is also named Amherst.

Amherst County was created in 1761 out of Albemarle County, and named in honor of Lord Jeffery Amherst. In 1807 as population increased, the county was reduced in size in order to form Nelson County. Tobacco was the major cash crop of the county during its early years. Before the American Civil War, this labor-intensive crop was cultivated and processed by African slaves.

As of the 2020 census, the population of the county was 31,307.

== History ==
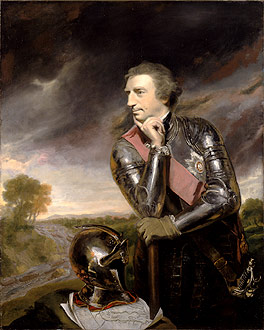
Jeffery Amherst, namesake of the county

Beginning thousands of years in the past, Native Americans were the first humans to populate the area. They hunted and fished mainly along the countless rivers and streams in the county. With the establishment of the Virginia Colony in 1607, English emigrants started to arrive in North America. By the late 17th century English explorers and traders had traveled up the James River to this area. Early trading posts were established between 1710 and 1720. By 1730, many new English colonial families moved into the area currently known as Amherst County, drawn by the desire for land and the good tobacco-growing soil.

Amherst County was formed in 1761, from part of southwestern Albemarle County. The original county seat had been in Cabelsville, now Colleen, in what would later become Nelson County. The county was named for after British military commander Lord Jeffery Amherst, known as the "Conqueror of Canada" for successfully securing Canada from the French during the Seven Years' War. Amherst had previously been named as Governor of Virginia, although he never came to this colony.

In 1806 the county took its present proportions, when Nelson County was formed from its northern half. At that point, the county seat was moved to the village of Five Oaks, later renamed Amherst. The present county courthouse was built in 1870 and has served the county ever since. Amherst County produced more Confederate soldiers per capita than anywhere else in the Confederate States of America.

In the early days, the major crop raised in Amherst County was tobacco. Apple orchards were part of mixed farming that replaced tobacco, especially in the late 19th century. Timber, mining, and milling were also important industries. The introduction of the railroad in the late 19th century greatly influenced the county's growth. The county contains many good examples of 18th, 19th and early 20th century rural and small town architecture. The downtown area of Amherst is a classic example of early 20th century commercial architecture.

== Recreation and attractions ==
Recreational attractions are located throughout the county. There are four recreational and public lakes, namely Mill Creek, Thrashers Lake, Otter Lake and Stonehouse Lake, which offer opportunities to fish, canoe or kayak. There are many parks and trails in the county, including about 25 miles of the Appalachian Trail, which runs through the George Washington National Forest. Offshoot trails lead to peaks in Amherst, such at Mount Pleasant, Cole Mountain, and Tar Jacket Ridge.

== Festivals in the area ==
- Rebec Vineyard's Garlic Festival
- Amherst County Sorghum Festival
- The Batteau Festival
- Amherst Apple Harvest Festival
- Amherst County Fair
- Monacan Indian Nation Pow Wow

== Geography ==
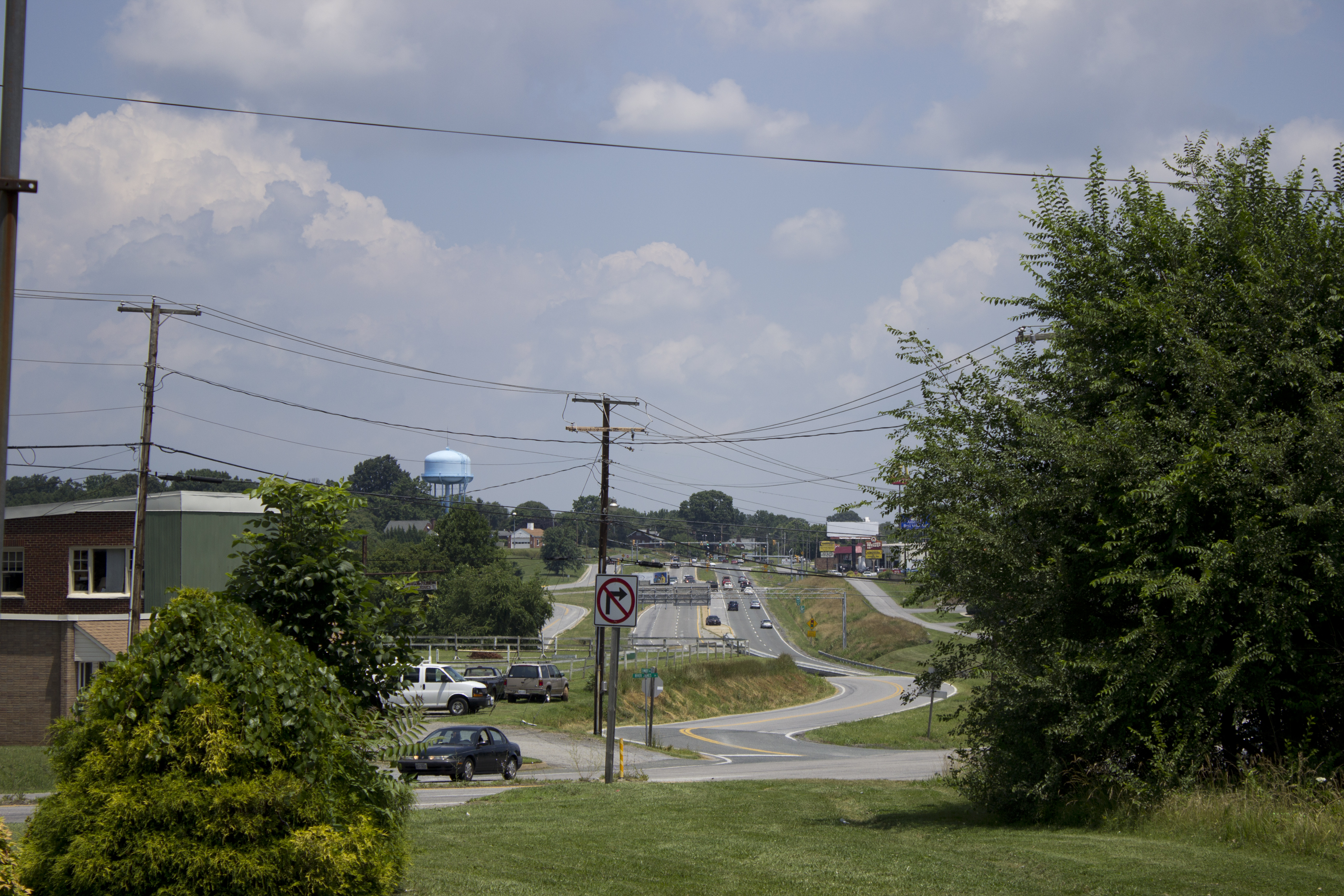
Looking toward U.S. 29 in Madison Heights

According to the U.S. Census Bureau, the county has a total area of 479 square miles (1,240 km^{2}), of which 474 square miles (1,230 km^{2}) is land and 4.9 square miles (13 km^{2}) (1.0%) is water.

=== Adjacent counties / Independent city ===
- Rockbridge County – northwest
- Nelson County – northeast
- Appomattox County – southeast
- Campbell County – south
- Lynchburg – south (independent city)
- Bedford County – southwest

=== National protected areas ===
- Blue Ridge Parkway (part)
- George Washington National Forest (part)

=== Major highways ===
- US 29 (N & S Amherst Hwy, S. Amherst Hwy is US BUS 29 south of Amherst and then turns into the Lynchburg Expressway in Madison Heights; Monacan Trail)
- US 60 (Lexington Turnpike; Richmond Hwy)
- US 501 (joins SR 130 and becomes Elon Rd.)
- SR 130 (Elon Rd; Amelon Hwy)
- SR 151 (Patrick Henry Hwy)
- SR 163 (S Amherst Hwy)
- SR 210 (Old Town Connector)
- Blue Ridge Parkway

== Demographics ==
Historical population
Census	Pop.	Note	%±
1790	13,703		—
1800	16,801		22.6%
1810	10,548		−37.2%
1820	10,423		−1.2%
1830	12,071		15.8%
1840	12,576		4.2%
1850	12,699		1.0%
1860	13,742		8.2%
1870	14,900		8.4%
1880	18,709		25.6%
1890	17,551		−6.2%
1900	17,864		1.8%
1910	18,932		6.0%
1920	19,771		4.4%
1930	19,020		−3.8%
1940	20,273		6.6%
1950	20,332		0.3%
1960	22,953		12.9%
1970	26,072		13.6%
1980	29,122		11.7%
1990	28,578		−1.9%
2000	31,894		11.6%
2010	32,353		1.4%
2020	31,307		−3.2%
2025 (est.)	31,962	▲	2.1%
U.S. Decennial Census; 1790–1960 1900–1990; 1990–2000 2010 2020

=== Racial and ethnic composition ===
Amherst County, Virginia – Racial and ethnic composition Note: the US Census treats Hispanic/Latino as an ethnic category. This table excludes Latinos from the racial categories and assigns them to a separate category. Hispanics/Latinos may be of any race.
Race / Ethnicity (NH = Non-Hispanic)	Pop 1980	Pop 1990	Pop 2000	Pop 2010	Pop 2020	% 1980	% 1990	% 2000	% 2010	% 2020
White alone (NH)	22,818	22,421	24,645	24,491	22,967	78.35%	78.46%	77.27%	75.70%	73.36%
Black or African American alone (NH)	5,880	5,720	6,267	6,104	5,346	20.19%	20.02%	19.65%	18.87%	17.08%
Native American or Alaska Native alone (NH)	157	128	250	296	243	0.54%	0.45%	0.78%	0.91%	0.78%
Asian alone (NH)	48	72	108	153	182	0.16%	0.25%	0.34%	0.47%	0.58%
Native Hawaiian or Pacific Islander alone (NH)	x	x	6	7	25	x	x	0.02%	0.02%	0.08%
Other race alone (NH)	6	6	56	44	145	0.02%	0.02%	0.18%	0.14%	0.46%
Mixed race or Multiracial (NH)	x	x	256	633	1,561	x	x	0.80%	1.96%	4.99%
Hispanic or Latino (any race)	213	231	306	625	838	0.73%	0.81%	0.96%	1.93%	2.68%
Total	29,122	28,578	31,894	32,353	31,307	100.00%	100.00%	100.00%	100.00%	100.00%

=== 2020 census ===
As of the 2020 census, the county had a population of 31,307. The median age was 44.8 years. 20.4% of residents were under the age of 18 and 21.6% of residents were 65 years of age or older. For every 100 females there were 91.6 males, and for every 100 females age 18 and over there were 88.9 males age 18 and over.

The racial makeup of the county was 74.1% White, 17.2% Black or African American, 0.8% American Indian and Alaska Native, 0.6% Asian, 0.1% Native Hawaiian and Pacific Islander, 1.4% from some other race, and 5.8% from two or more races. Hispanic or Latino residents of any race comprised 2.7% of the population.

37.6% of residents lived in urban areas, while 62.4% lived in rural areas.

There were 12,746 households in the county, of which 26.5% had children under the age of 18 living with them and 27.7% had a female householder with no spouse or partner present. About 27.8% of all households were made up of individuals and 14.0% had someone living alone who was 65 years of age or older.

There were 14,232 housing units, of which 10.4% were vacant. Among occupied housing units, 75.6% were owner-occupied and 24.4% were renter-occupied. The homeowner vacancy rate was 2.1% and the rental vacancy rate was 6.5%.

=== 2000 census ===
As of the census of 2000, there were 31,894 people, 11,941 households, and 8,645 families residing in the county. The population density was 67 people per square mile (26 people/km^{2}). There were 12,958 housing units at an average density of 27 units per square mile (10 units/km^{2}). The racial makeup of the county was 77.67% White, 19.79% Black or African American, 0.81% Native American, 0.35% Asian, 0.02% Pacific Islander, 0.41% from other races, and 0.94% from two or more races. 0.96% of the population were Hispanic or Latino of any race.

There were 11,941 households, out of which 31.70% had children under the age of 18 living with them, 56.00% were married couples living together, 12.40% had a female householder with no husband present, and 27.60% were non-families. 24.00% of all households were made up of individuals, and 9.90% had someone living alone who was 65 years of age or older. The average household size was 2.51 and the average family size was 2.95.

In the county, the population was spread out, with 23.50% under the age of 18, 9.70% from 18 to 24, 27.70% from 25 to 44, 25.30% from 45 to 64, and 13.80% who were 65 years of age or older. The median age was 38 years. For every 100 females there were 91.10 males. For every 100 females age 18 and over, there were 87.10 males.

The median income for a household in the county was $37,393, and the median income for a family was $42,876. Males had a median income of $31,493 versus $22,155 for females. The per capita income for the county was $16,952. About 8.00% of families and 10.70% of the population were below the poverty line, including 13.20% of those under age 18 and 11.60% of those age 65 or over.

== Government ==
The Board of Supervisors are elected from single-member districts.

=== Board of Supervisors ===
- District 1: Tom Martin
- District 2: Claudia D. Tucker (R)
- District 3: Chris Adams
- District 4: David Pugh, Jr.
- District 5: Drew Wade (R)

=== Constitutional officers ===
- Clerk of the Circuit Court: Deborah C. Mozingo
- Commissioner of the Revenue: Jane Irby (I)
- Commonwealth's Attorney: W. Lyle Carver
- Sheriff: Jimmy Ayres
- Treasurer: Joanne Carden

Amherst County is represented by Republican Tom A. Garrett, Jr. in the Virginia Senate, Republican T. Scott Garrett and Republican Ronnie R. Campbell in the Virginia House of Delegates, and Republican Ben Cline in the U.S. House of Representatives.

United States presidential election results for Amherst County, Virginia
Year	Republican		Democratic		Third party(ies)	
Year	No.	%	No.	%	No.	%
1912	64	7.13%	765	85.28%	68	7.58%
1916	93	7.46%	1,142	91.58%	12	0.96%
1920	168	13.23%	1,094	86.14%	8	0.63%
1924	129	9.72%	1,092	82.29%	106	7.99%
1928	447	23.66%	1,442	76.34%	0	0.00%
1932	195	9.85%	1,764	89.09%	21	1.06%
1936	236	11.94%	1,734	87.75%	6	0.30%
1940	292	12.44%	2,048	87.26%	7	0.30%
1944	442	14.54%	2,585	85.06%	12	0.39%
1948	460	18.65%	1,481	60.06%	525	21.29%
1952	1,407	40.20%	2,078	59.37%	15	0.43%
1956	1,529	42.59%	1,933	53.84%	128	3.57%
1960	1,455	38.83%	2,280	60.85%	12	0.32%
1964	2,675	49.45%	2,730	50.46%	5	0.09%
1968	2,656	39.80%	1,543	23.12%	2,475	37.08%
1972	4,909	73.94%	1,512	22.77%	218	3.28%
1976	3,956	50.87%	3,675	47.26%	145	1.86%
1980	5,088	57.56%	3,476	39.32%	276	3.12%
1984	7,004	66.51%	3,409	32.37%	117	1.11%
1988	6,507	64.10%	3,567	35.14%	77	0.76%
1992	5,482	50.26%	4,101	37.60%	1,325	12.15%
1996	5,094	46.63%	4,864	44.53%	966	8.84%
2000	6,660	56.86%	4,812	41.09%	240	2.05%
2004	7,758	61.11%	4,866	38.33%	71	0.56%
2008	8,470	57.62%	6,094	41.46%	136	0.93%
2012	8,876	59.29%	5,900	39.41%	194	1.30%
2016	9,719	63.13%	5,057	32.85%	620	4.03%
2020	11,041	64.93%	5,672	33.35%	292	1.72%
2024	11,742	67.65%	5,429	31.28%	187	1.08%

== Education ==
Amherst County is served by Amherst County Public Schools, which operates one central high school, two middle schools, and several elementary schools. Temple Christian School is a private school located on the grounds of Temple Baptist Church. Sweet Briar College is also located in Amherst County, just south of the town of Amherst.

== Communities ==
=== Town ===
- Amherst

=== Census-designated place ===
- Madison Heights

=== Other unincorporated communities ===
- Clifford
- Elon
- Monroe
- Riverville
- Stapleton
- Sweet Briar

== Notable people ==
- James John Floyd (1750–1783), born in Amherst County, co-founder of Louisville, KY and early settler in that area; Kentucky Colonel and pioneer judge
- William Barnett (1761–1834), born in Amherst County, United States Congressman
- William Becknell, born in Amherst County, first white man to open what would become the Santa Fe Trail
- Samuel Jordan Cabell (1756–1818), born in Amherst County, United States Congressman
- Peter Cartwright (1785–1872), born in Amherst County, noted "hellfire and brimstone" preacher
- Abraham Childers (1750–1849), raised in Amherst County, member of the Kentucky Senate
- Powhatan Ellis (1790–1863), born in Amherst County, justice of the Mississippi Supreme Court, United States Senator from Mississippi, and minister to Mexico. Ellisville, Mississippi, is named in his honor
- David S. Garland (1769–1841), Congressman, master of the Brick House (Clifford, Virginia), founder of the New Glasgow Academy
- Ottie Cline Powell (1890–1894), born in Amherst County, four-year-old boy who died after getting lost collecting firewood outside his schoolhouse. There is an urban legend that Ottie haunts the area where he died.
- Pierre Thomas (b.1962) is an American journalist. He serves as a senior justice correspondent at ABC News. He has twice won an Emmy, as well as winning a Peabody Award and DuPont Award and been named "Journalist of the Year" by the National Association of Black Journalists.
- William H. Crawford (7th United States Secretary of the Treasury)

== See also ==
- National Register of Historic Places listings in Amherst County, Virginia
