= Tornadoes of 2018 =

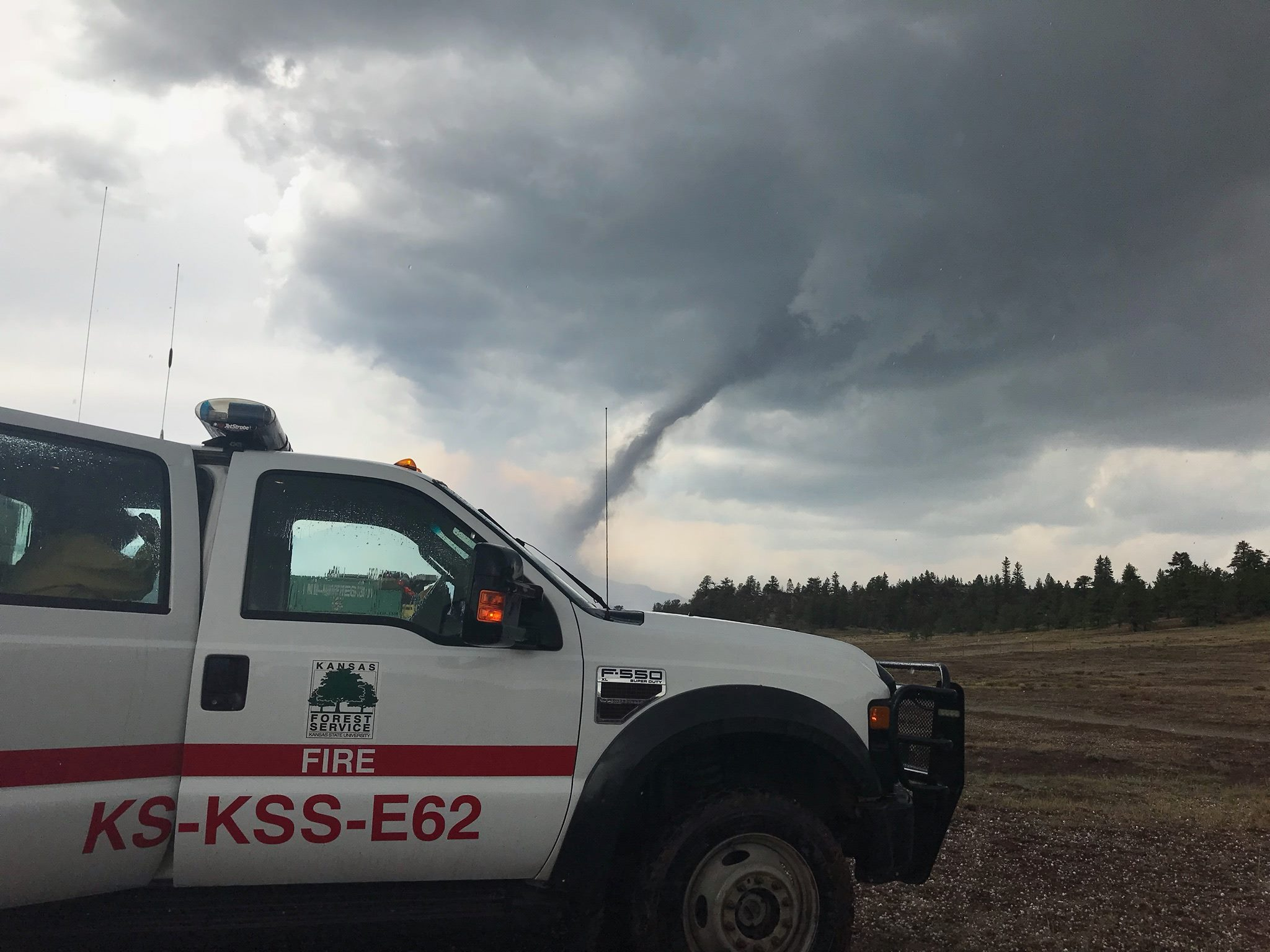
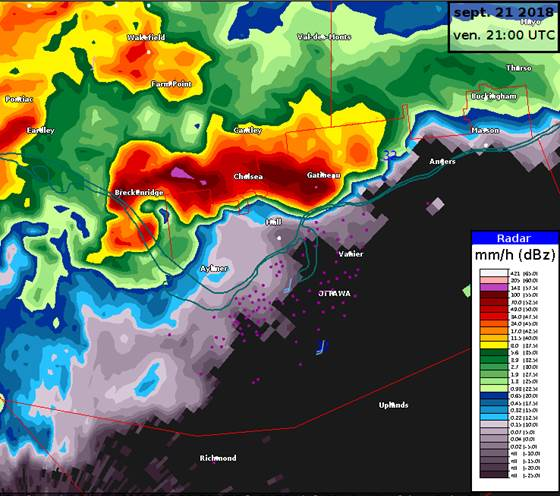
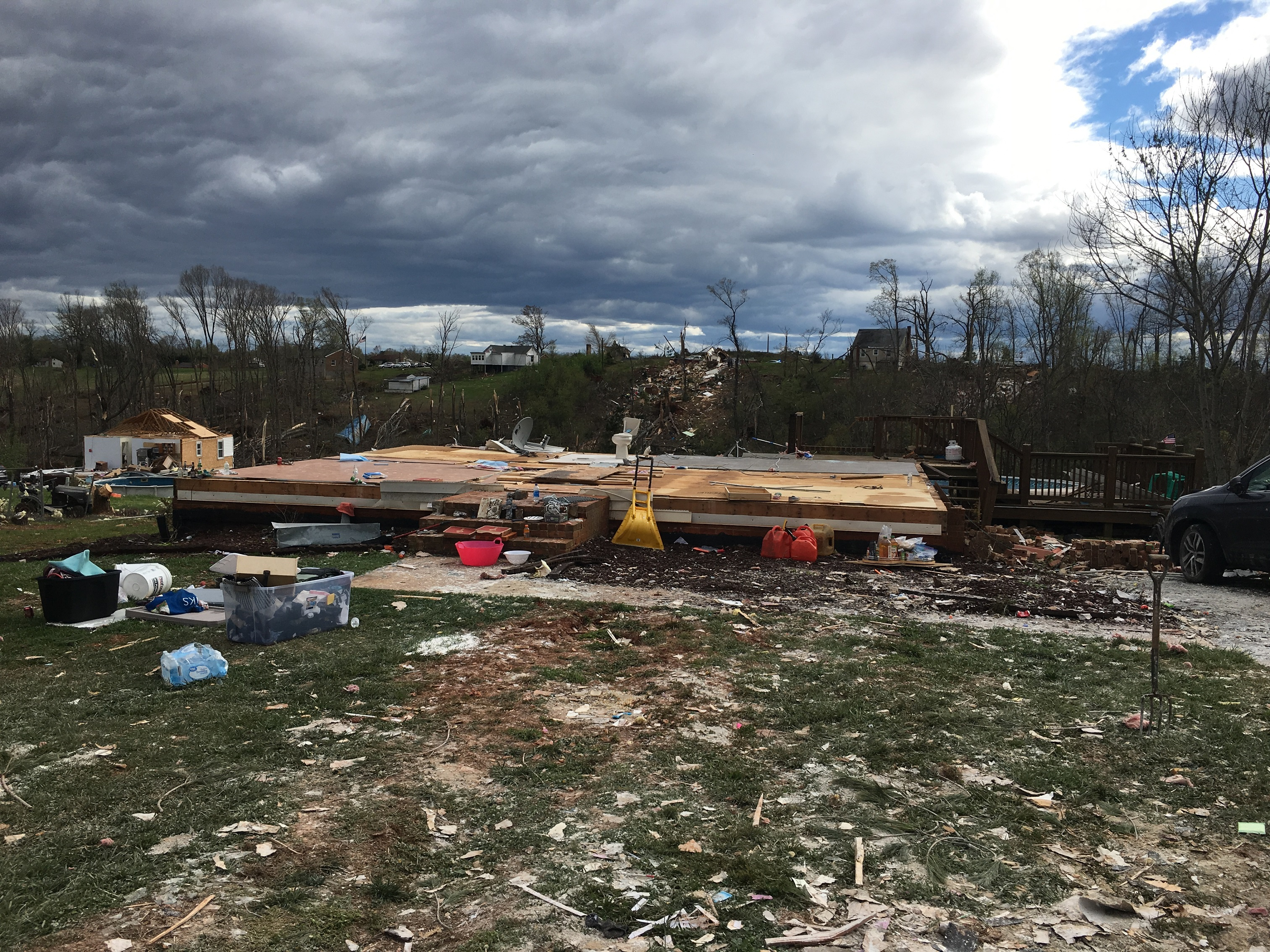
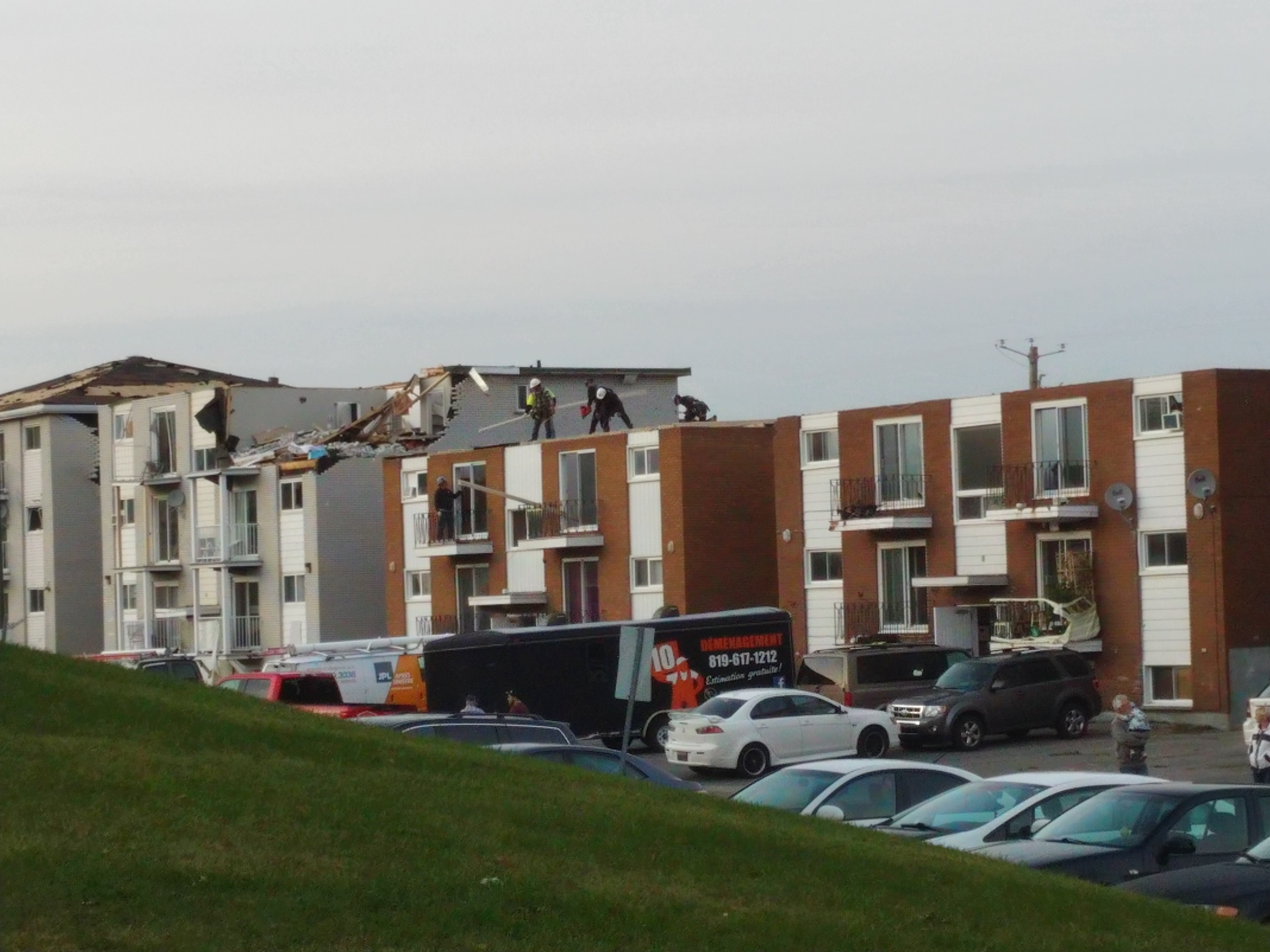
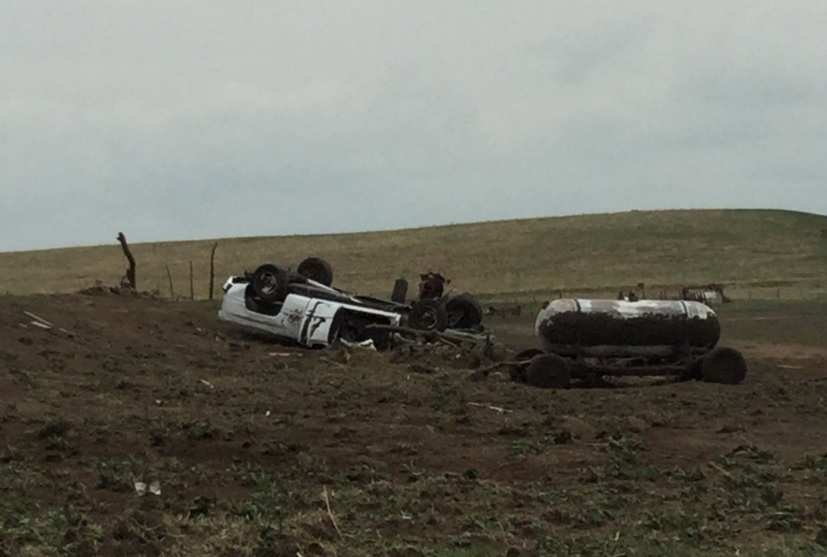
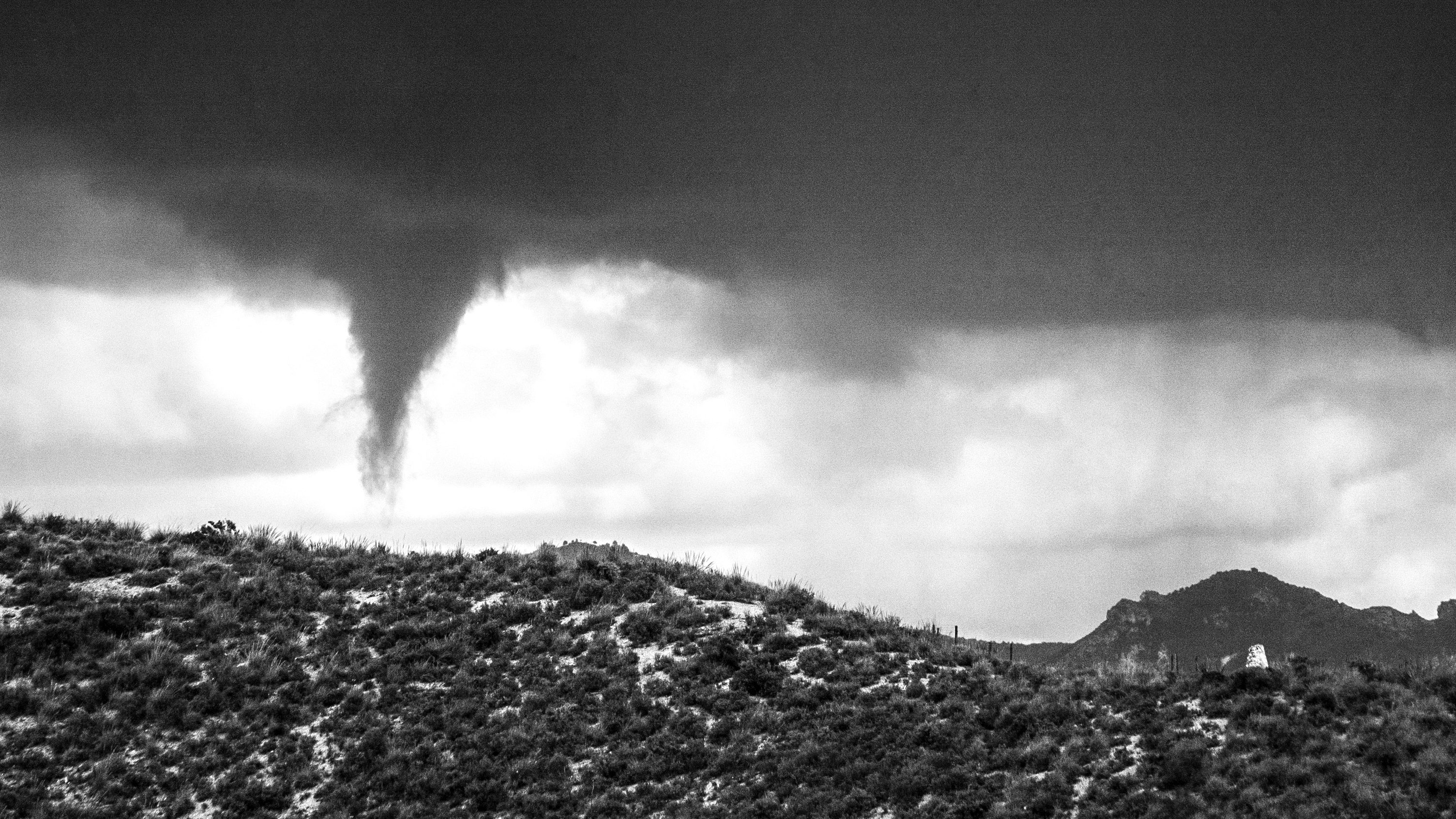
- Clockwise from top: A rare, high-elevation EF0 tornado spawned by the Weston Pass Fire on July 5; a poorly-anchored home that was swept away by an EF3 tornado in Elon, Virginia on April 15; a pickup truck that was thrown 300 yards by an EF3 tornado near Tescott, Kansas on May 1; a funnel cloud in rural Spain on May 4; Severe damage to an apartment complex in Gatineau, Quebec, following a high-end EF3 tornado on September 21; radar imagery of the supercell responsible for producing the Gatineau tornado.
- Timespan: January 1 – December 31
- Maximum rated tornado: EF4 tornado: Coxilha, Rio Grande do Sul on June 12 (F4); Alonsa, Manitoba on August 3
- Tornadoes in U.S.: 1,121
- Damage (U.S.): $672 million
- Fatalities (U.S.): 10 (record low)
- Fatalities (worldwide): 20

This page documents notable tornadoes and tornado outbreaks worldwide in 2018. Strong and destructive tornadoes form most frequently in the United States, Brazil, Bangladesh and Eastern India, but they can occur almost anywhere under the right conditions. Tornadoes also develop occasionally in southern Canada during the Northern Hemisphere's summer and somewhat regularly at other times of the year across Europe, Asia, Argentina and Australia. Tornadic events are often accompanied with other forms of severe weather, including strong thunderstorms, strong winds, and hail. There were 1,169 preliminary filtered reported tornadoes and 1,121 confirmed tornadoes in the United States in 2018. Worldwide, 20 tornado-related deaths were confirmed; 10 in the United States, four in Brazil, two each in Indonesia and Italy, and one each in Argentina and Canada.

The United States saw near-average numbers of tornadoes, but near-record low numbers of strong (EF2-EF5) tornadoes. 2018 was the only year since reliable record-keeping began in the 1950s in which no officially rated violent (EF4-EF5) tornadoes occurred in the United States. 2018 also had the lowest number of tornado-related fatalities on record in the United States. In contrast to the United States, Canada experienced above-average numbers of strong tornadoes, including the only officially rated violent tornado of the year.

== Events ==
=== United States ===
Confirmed tornadoes by Enhanced Fujita rating
EFU	EF0	EF1	EF2	EF3	EF4	EF5	Total
15	619	399	76	12	0	0	1,121

A map of 2018 United States tornado paths from the results of storm surveys.

A chart of the 2018 United States tornado count estimated from the number of preliminary reports

Fatal United States tornadoes in 2018
- Approximate touchdown location of killer tornadoes in 2018 Summary of tornadoes: February 24 – Kentucky (1 death); February 24 – Arkansas (1 death); April 14 – Louisiana (1 death); May 15 – New York (1 death); July 9 – North Dakota (1 death); September 17 – Virginia (1 death); November 2 – Maryland (2 deaths); November 6 – Tennessee (1 death); December 1 – Missouri (1 death); Total fatalities: 10

== January ==
=== January 1 (France) ===
FU	F0	F1	F2	F3	F4	F5
0	1	1	2	0	0	0

Four tornadoes were reported in western France on January 1, including two strong F2 tornadoes. The first tornado touched down and completely destroyed a wind turbine at F2 strength near Bouin, in the region of Pays de la Loire. The second tornado was a weak and brief F0 that was about 50 yards wide, that hit Saint-Paul-Mont-Penit, again in Pays de la Loire. This tornado damaged an equestrian center, tossed a trampoline, downed trees, and damaged the roof of a school. The third tornado was an F1 with a damage path of about 5 kilometers long that hit to the south of Macau, in the region of Nouvelle-Aquitaine. The Macau area tornado caused considerable roof and structural damage to homes and businesses, and downed signs and fences along its path, with much of the damage occurring in the Lafont area. The last tornado was an F2 that hit Aize and nearby rural areas in the region of Centre-Val de Loire. Numerous large trees were snapped or uprooted, outbuildings were destroyed, and multiple homes sustained severe damage as a result of this strong tornado, including a few that had their roofs completely torn off.

=== January 21–22 (United States) ===
EFU	EF0	EF1	EF2	EF3	EF4	EF5
0	6	6	1	0	0	0

A small outbreak of 13 tornadoes impacted the Southern United States on January 21 and 22. On January 21, an EF1 tornado struck the town of Huntington, Arkansas, where trees were downed, a metal structure was destroyed, and a mobile home was damaged along with multiple chicken houses. An EF2 tornado caused significant damage as it clipped the eastern outskirts of De Kalb, Texas. The De Kalb tornado tore roofs off of homes, snapped and twisted numerous trees, damaged a church, and completely destroyed many large chicken houses along its path. Weak tornado activity continued the following day. An EF1 tornado near Taylorsville, Mississippi destroyed sheds and barns, damaged homes, pushed a mobile home off of its foundation, snapped and uprooted many trees, and injured one person. Another EF1 tornado caused extensive roof damage to a church and multiple homes near Greenbrier, Arkansas. One injury and no fatalities occurred as a result of this outbreak.

== February ==
=== February 24 (United States) ===
EFU	EF0	EF1	EF2	EF3	EF4	EF5
0	9	15	6	0	0	0

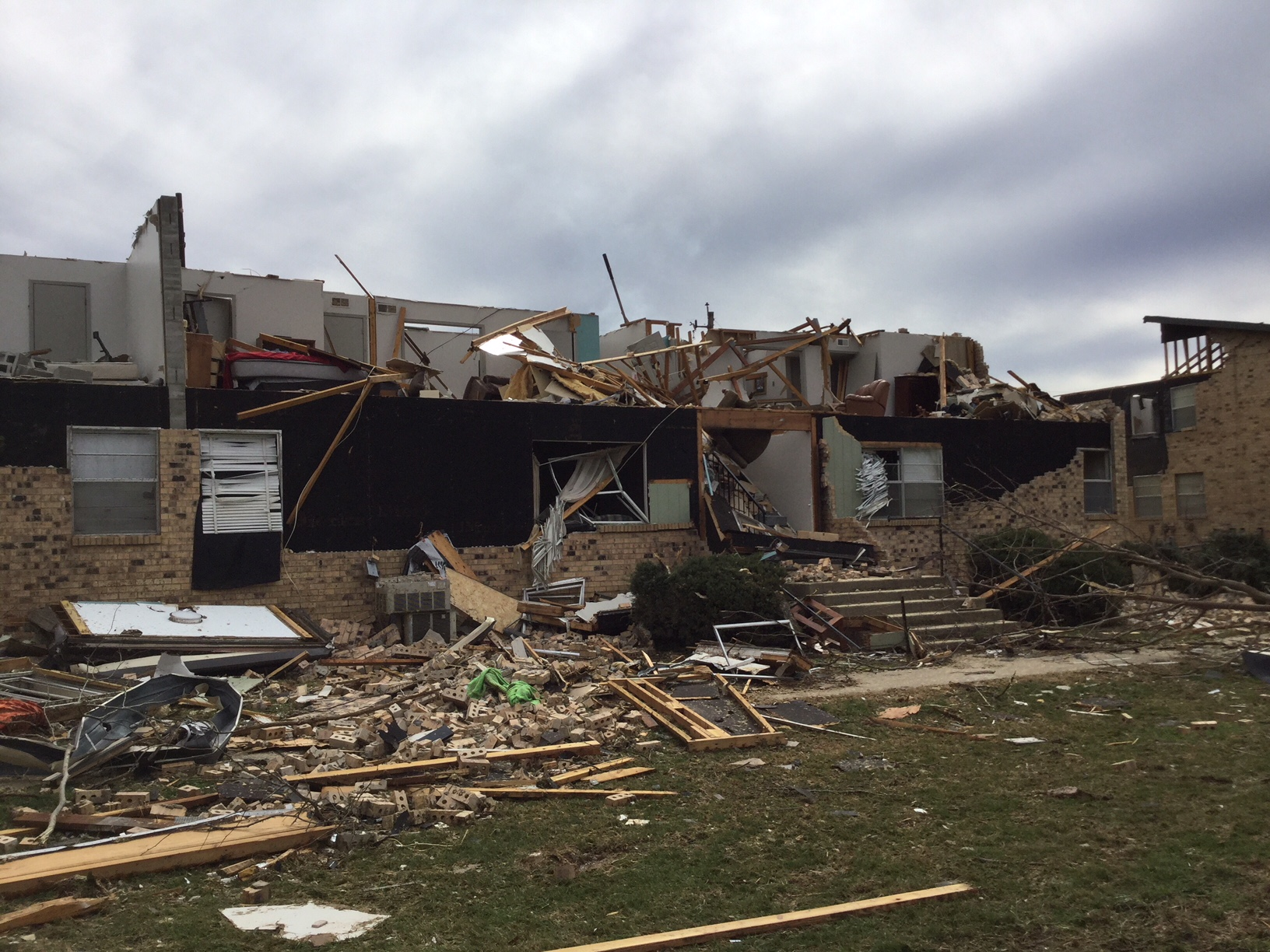
High-end EF2 damage to a two-story apartment complex in Hopkinsville, Kentucky.

On February 24, the Storm Prediction Center issued an enhanced risk of severe weather across much of the Lower Mississippi River Valley. This included a 10% hatched risk area for tornadoes. A mixed convective mode was predicted, with both bowing line segments and discrete supercell thunderstorms expected to develop in the threat area. That day, temperatures peaked in the mid-70s°F (mid-20s°C) with dewpoints in the mid-to-upper 60s°F. This also included a risk of flash flooding, damaging wind gusts exceeding 58 miles per hour (93 km/h), as well as the aforementioned 10% tornado risk, and a 5% risk for hail. Throughout the event, the development of isolated supercell thunderstorms that was expected did not occur. However, a large quasi-linear convective system developed, and numerous semi-discrete supercell structures and embedded mesovortices within the larger line of severe storms produced a moderate outbreak of tornadoes. While most of these tornadoes were relatively brief, several of them were strong, resulting in major damage and fatalities.

A high-end EF2 tornado near Adairville, Kentucky destroyed several homes and barns and killed an elderly woman, ending a record 283-day streak without any tornado-related deaths. Another high-end EF2 struck the southeast side of Hopkinsville, severely damaging multiple two-story apartment buildings and injuring nine people. An EF1 tornado caused roof damage to many homes and businesses in Murray as well. In Arkansas, an EF1 tornado caused moderate damage to many structures in the town of Keiser and blew much of the roof off of a hotel near Osceola. An EF2 tornado near Knobel killed one person when a mobile home was thrown into a pond. The same tornado later crossed into Missouri and struck the town of Malden, where numerous homes were heavily damaged and several people were injured. Also in Missouri, several homes in the town of Matthews had their roofs ripped off as the result of an EF2 tornado. Another EF2 tornado touched down in the eastern part of Clarksville, Tennessee as well, where several homes and duplexes were damaged or destroyed, and many vehicles and a few buildings were damaged at an industrial complex. A total of 30 tornadoes were confirmed as a result of this outbreak, which resulted in two fatalities and at least 20 injuries.

After the line of storms, flooding occurred along the Ohio River, which crested at 60.53 feet (18.45 m), the 22nd highest in recorded history and highest since 1997. This flooding caused six people to die. The flooding from this particular storm caused rainfall levels to hit 2.41 inches (61 mm) in Cincinnati, 3.03 inches (77 mm) in Louisville, and 3.18 inches (81 mm) in Evansville. Damage totalled $526 million, including $500 million from flooding and $26 million from tornadoes.

== March ==
=== March 12 (Italy) ===
During the overnight hours of March 12, a damaging F2 tornado moved through the southern portions of Caserta, Italy injuring at least eight people. Well-built brick buildings had windows blown out and sustained some collapse of exterior masonry. Large business signs were toppled, and vehicles were thrown off of roads and severely damaged. Brick fences were blown over, large trees were downed, and multiple homes and apartment buildings were damaged as well.

=== March 18–19 (United States) ===
EFU	EF0	EF1	EF2	EF3	EF4	EF5
0	7	10	4	1	0	0

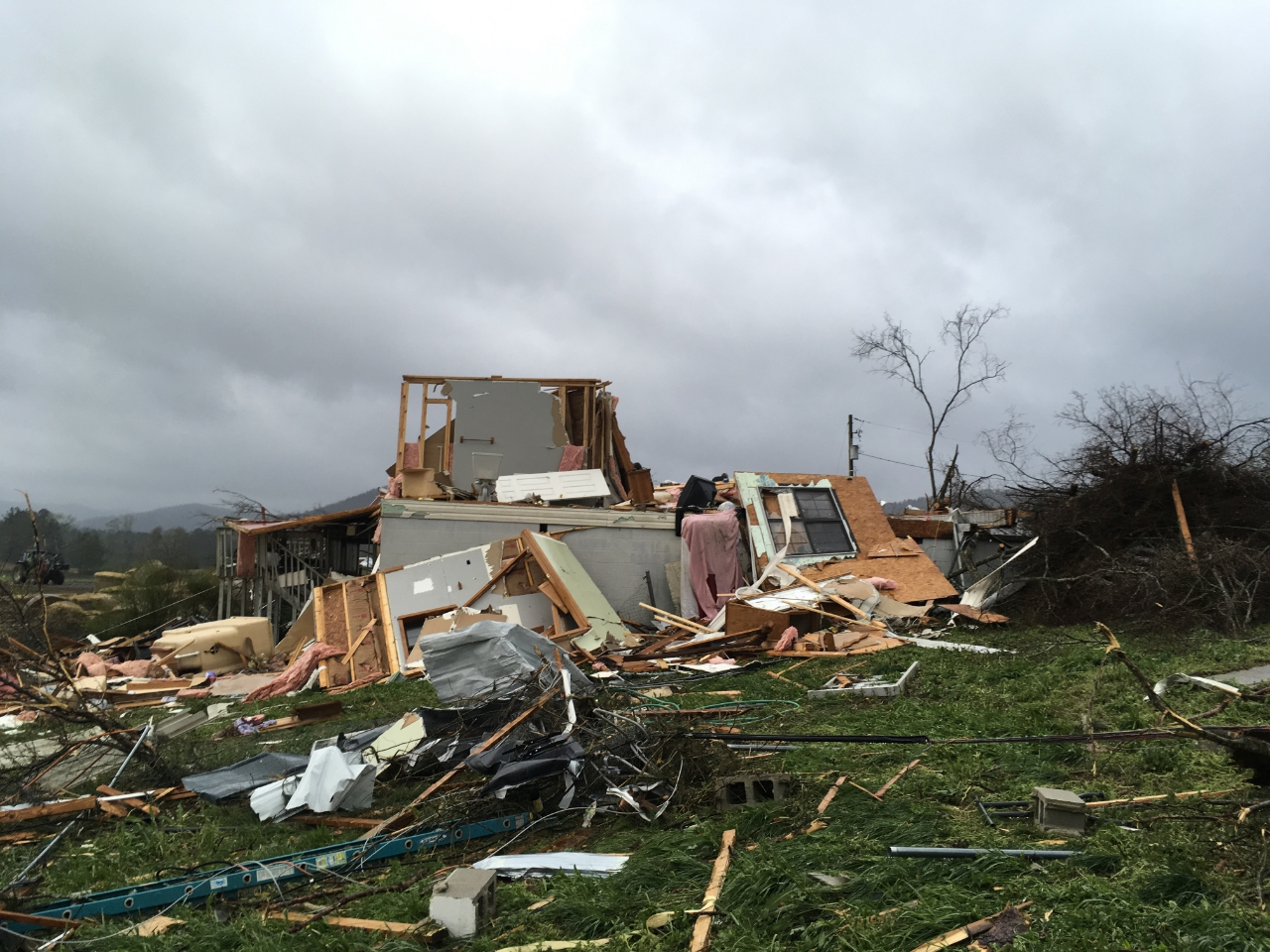
EF3 damage to a house in Nances Creek, Alabama, near Jacksonville.

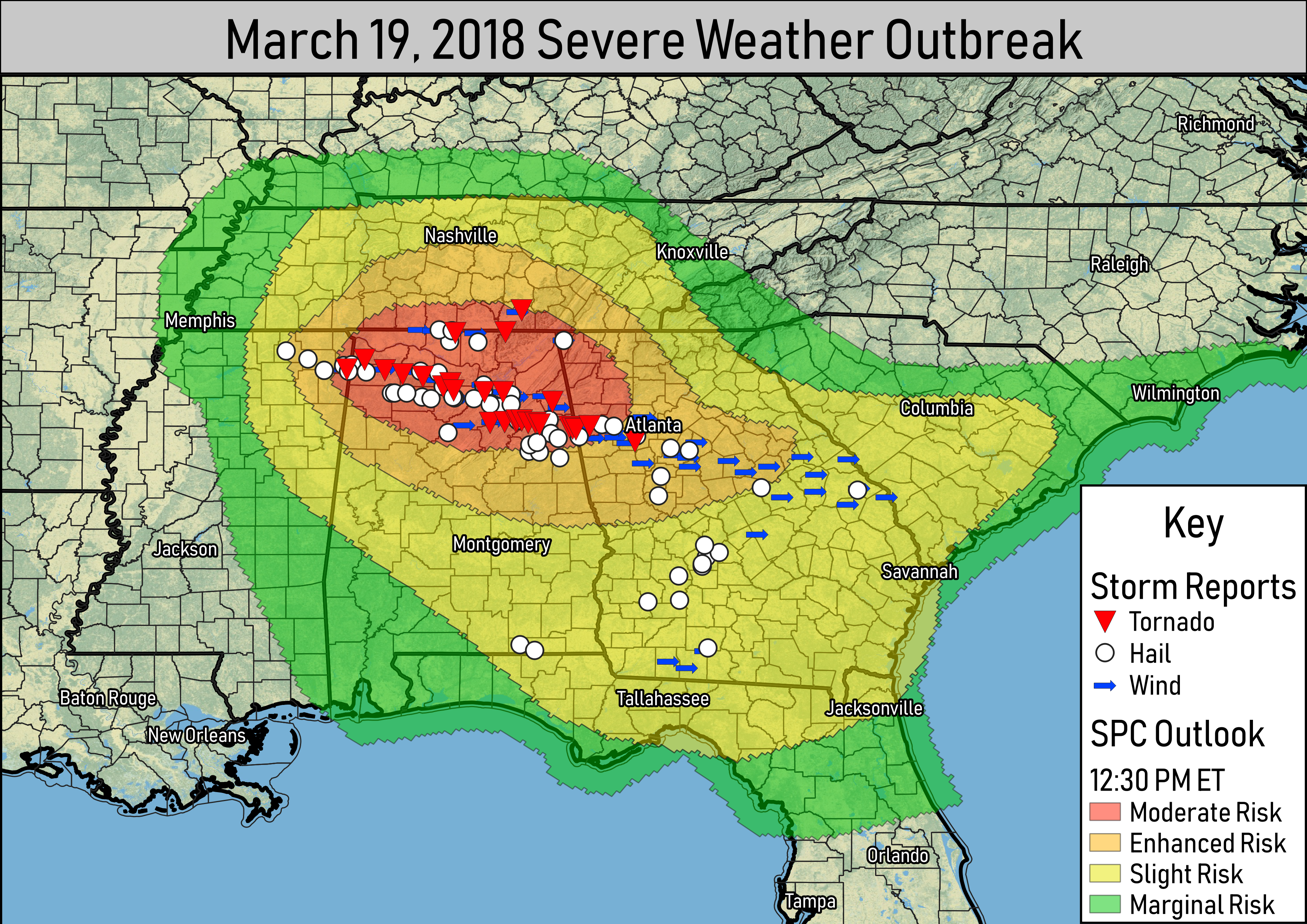
SPC outlook with storm reports for March 19.

On March 18, the Storm Prediction Center issued a slight risk for severe weather across much of the Southern United States. Scattered severe weather occurred, including an EF1 tornado that caused minor damage near the town of Glazier, Texas. The system pushed eastward on March 19, along with a highly unstable and sheared environment in place across portions of Alabama, Georgia, and Tennessee. The SPC then issued a moderate risk for severe weather, including a 15% hatched risk area for tornadoes. Multiple strong tornadoes touched down that evening, including an EF2 that uprooted hundreds of trees and ripped roofs off of homes near Ardmore, Alabama. A high-end EF2 severely damaged or destroyed several homes near the town of Southside. The most significant tornado of the event was a damaging, long-tracked EF3 that struck Jacksonville, Alabama, where the Jacksonville State University campus and multiple apartment complexes sustained major damage. This tornado also became the first EF3 tornado in the United States in 306 days. The same tornado also destroyed several houses and mobile homes in the small community of Nances Creek. In Russellville, an EF1 tornado caused minor damage to numerous homes and several businesses. Further east in Georgia, an EF2 tornado touched down in the Atlanta suburb of South Fulton, damaging many homes in a subdivision. The supercell thunderstorms that produced the tornadoes during this event were very high-precipitation in nature, some of which even produced some very large hail; this included baseball to grapefruit-sized hailstones that fell across several counties in northern Alabama. One particularly massive hailstone found in Cullman County was measured at approximately 5.25 inches in peak width, had a circumference of 13.75 inches, and weighed 8.9 ounces; that made it the largest hailstone ever recorded in Alabama state history. No fatalities occurred during this outbreak, though seven people were injured. A total of 22 tornadoes were confirmed. In addition to tornadoes, the largest hailstone in Alabama history at 5.38 inches (13.7 cm) fell.

== April ==
=== April 3 (United States) ===
EFU	EF0	EF1	EF2	EF3	EF4	EF5
0	5	14	3	0	0	0

On April 3, 2018, the Storm Prediction Center issued a moderate risk of severe weather throughout parts of the Midwest and Southern United States, including a 10% hatched risk area for tornadoes across much of the Ohio Valley. Multiple tornadoes occurred throughout the Midwest, causing damage in Missouri, Illinois, Indiana, Kentucky, and Ohio, a few of which were strong. An EF1 tornado caused damage to farms near Xenia, Ohio on the 44th anniversary of the 1974 F5 Xenia Tornado, while another EF1 damaged homes and power poles in the Columbus suburb of Grove City. In Simpson County, Kentucky, a man was killed when flooding washed his car away. Two EF2 tornadoes destroyed homes near the Illinois towns of Galatia and Vandalia. In Energy, Illinois, an EF1 tornado heavily damaged a couple of businesses. An EF2 tornado near Burna, Kentucky destroyed vehicles and twisted a home off of its foundation as well. It also killed one person in their home. Numerous reports of damaging straight-line winds and large hail were also received. 22 tornadoes were confirmed as a result of this outbreak.

=== April 6–7 (United States) ===
EFU	EF0	EF1	EF2	EF3	EF4	EF5
1	6	12	1	0	0	0

An area of low pressure pushed eastward from the Texas Panhandle into northwestern Louisiana on April 6. The Storm Prediction Center issued an enhanced risk of severe weather, including a 5% risk of tornadoes. Within the moist and unstable warm sector from eastern Texas into western Mississippi, severe thunderstorms developed and led to numerous reports of damaging winds and large hail, as well as several tornadoes. Subsequent damage surveys confirmed 20 tornadoes from April 6 into April 7, most notably an EF2 wedge tornado near Coushatta, Louisiana that prompted a tornado emergency and destroyed several metal structures. Many trees and power poles were snapped as a result of this tornado as well. Three separate EF1 tornadoes also damaged several homes and downed many trees near DeRidder, Louisiana.

=== April 13–15 (United States) ===
EFU	EF0	EF1	EF2	EF3	EF4	EF5
0	22	40	10	1	0	0

From the April 13 to 15, a three-day outbreak of tornadoes impacted the Midwest, Deep South, and East Coast of the United States, several of which were strong. On April 13, the Storm Prediction Center issued a moderate risk of severe weather across parts of Arkansas, Louisiana, and Texas, including a 15% hatched risk area for tornadoes. An enhanced risk of severe weather was issued for parts of Missouri and Iowa as well. Supercell thunderstorms developed and multiple tornadoes touched down in the threat area that evening, including an EF2 multiple-vortex tornado that struck Mountainburg, Arkansas. This tornado tossed vehicles from roads, severely damaged multiple homes, and injured four people. A high-end EF2 ripped the roofs and exterior walls from a home near Norwood, Missouri as well. Later that night and into the early morning hours of April 14, the storms merged into a large squall line and pushed eastward across parts of the Southern United States. An enhanced risk of severe weather was issued for parts of Louisiana, Mississippi, and Alabama, including a 10% risk of tornadoes. A large EF1 tornado moved through Shreveport, Bossier City, and Red Chute, Louisiana during the early morning hours and downed many trees, one of which fell onto a travel trailer and killed a child inside. An EF2 tornado near Bryceland destroyed barns and ripped much of the roof off of a home as well, while another EF2 near Carencro damaged homes and businesses along its path. An EF2 tornado near Portland, Arkansas also caused heavy damage. During the mid-morning hours, an EF2 tornado embedded in the squall line struck Meridian, Mississippi, causing significant damage to homes and apartment buildings.

On April 15, an enhanced risk of severe weather was issued for parts of Virginia and the Carolinas, again including a 10% risk of tornadoes. Semi-discrete supercell structures embedded in the line produced strong tornadoes in North Carolina, South Carolina, and Virginia. One high-end EF2 tornado destroyed homes and businesses, and damaged an elementary school as it moved through populated areas of Greensboro, North Carolina, injuring ten people. An EF2 tornado near Gilbert, South Carolina caused severe damage to trees, power poles, and chicken houses. Another strong tornado heavily damaged businesses and flipped vehicles as it moved through the Lynchburg, Virginia area before striking Elon at EF3 strength. Many homes were badly damaged or destroyed in Elon, including several poorly anchored homes that were leveled and swept from their foundations. One person was killed as a result of this outbreak, and 29 others were injured. 73 tornadoes were confirmed.

== May ==
=== May 1–3 (United States) ===
EFU	EF0	EF1	EF2	EF3	EF4	EF5
5	26	18	1	1	0	0

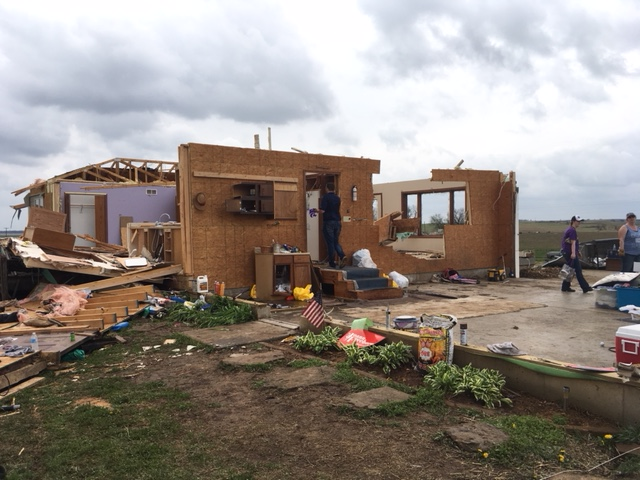
Low-end EF3 damage to a home west of Tescott, Kansas

On May 1, the Storm Prediction Center issued a moderate risk of severe weather across much of Kansas, with a 10% hatched risk of tornadoes. Multiple tornadoes were reported, including a large EF3 wedge tornado that passed near Tescott, Kansas. This tornado destroyed a house and numerous outbuildings, tossed vehicles, and was documented by many storm chasers. The area of the Central Plains that was affected by the outbreak had been experiencing an unusually slow start to the tornado season, particularly in both Kansas and Oklahoma, the latter of which did not have a single recorded tornado during the first four months of 2018. On May 2, the Storm Prediction Center issued another moderate risk of severe weather, again with a 10% hatched risk of tornadoes across Kansas and Oklahoma. While low-level shear was relatively weak, elevated CAPE values, steep lapse rates, and leftover outflow boundaries were previous storms were all present in the threat area. Due to these compensating factors, the possibility of a few significant tornadoes was noted. However, the supercell thunderstorms that did develop were mostly outflow-dominant causing mostly weak tornadoes occurred although one EF2 tornado did touch down near Loveland, Oklahoma, causing considerable tree, power line, and outbuilding damage. Additional weak tornadoes occurred on May 3 before the event came to an end. A total of 51 tornadoes were confirmed as a result of this outbreak, none of which resulted in injuries or fatalities. However, the damage toll was high, at $1.6 billion.

=== May 14–15 (United States) ===
EFU	EF0	EF1	EF2	EF3	EF4	EF5
1	12	9	2	0	0	0

A moderate two-day outbreak of tornadoes affected the Great Plains and Northeastern United States. Multiple tornadoes touched down in Kansas on May 14, including a strong EF2 tornado that toppled large trees and power poles a mile east of Maple City, Kansas. A strong derecho, with several associated tornadoes, impacted the Northeastern United States the following day. An EF2 tornado snapped many large trees and damaged businesses in Kent, New York. The towns of Oxford, Connecticut and Patterson, New York sustained minor damage from EF1 tornadoes as well. An EF0 tornado toppled a tree onto a moving vehicle in Newburgh, New York, killing one person. Another five people in the Northeastern United States were killed by straight-line winds. All Metro-North Railroad services out of Grand Central Terminal were suspended that night due to the storm. The straight line winds, select areas seeing excess of 100-mph, also forced the Delaware Water Gap National Recreation Area to briefly close, with Sleeping Giant State Park closed for over a year. A total of 24 tornadoes were confirmed. Damage from the entire outbreak amounted to $1.5 billion, and 600,000 customers in the Northeast lost power.

=== May 16 (Europe) ===
FU	F0	F1	F2	F3	F4	F5
0	3	0	1	0	0	0

An F2 tornado in Germany hit areas in and around the small towns of Boisheim, Dilkrath, and Schellerbaum in the Viersen district of North Rhine-Westphalia. Homes sustained heavy roof damage along the path, fences were downed, and an RV camper was tossed. The most intense damage occurred in heavily forested areas, where a large, wide swath of trees was completely flattened. A weather data recording station located in the path of the tornado measured winds of 223 km/h (139 mph). The tornado was caught on video and photographed by many local residents. Two people were injured. A brief F0 tornado also touched down near Spiegelburg, Germany, causing no known damage. Two F0 tornadoes were also confirmed in France, one of which caused minor damage to trees, roofs, and garden furniture in Mercurey. The other caused minor tree damage and tossed an empty water tank near Beaune. A total of four tornadoes were confirmed.

== June ==
=== June 1 (United States) ===
EFU	EF0	EF1	EF2	EF3	EF4	EF5
1	8	2	3	1	0	0

Scattered tornadoes, a couple of which were strong, occurred across portions of the northern Great Plains, following the issuance of a moderate risk of severe weather by the Storm Prediction Center. This outlook included a 10% risk of tornadoes. An EF3 tornado caused major damage as it moved through a rural subdivision outside of Gillette, Wyoming, damaging or destroying multiple manufactured homes and tossing vehicles. This was the first EF3 or stronger tornado in Wyoming since the Teton-Yellowstone tornado of 1987. A separate EF1 tornado caused moderate damage as it struck a residential area at the northern edge of Gillette, while another EF1 caused damage at a mine and a power plant to the north of town. A fourth EF0 rope tornado occurred west of town, causing no damage. Two EF2 tornadoes downed close to 1,000 trees each near the towns of Ten Sleep and Mayoworth as well. Another EF2 tornado also caused significant damage near Kildeer, North Dakota. Multiple other weak tornadoes were confirmed in other states as well. A total of 15 tornadoes occurred as a result of this small outbreak, and two people were injured.

=== June 6–8 (United States) ===
EFU	EF0	EF1	EF2	EF3	EF4	EF5
0	7	2	1	1	0	0

During the evening hours of June 6, a low-precipitation supercell thunderstorm produced a long-lived EF3 tornado near Laramie, Wyoming. The tornado remained over mostly open terrain, and was photographed and caught on video by many locals and storm chasers. Many wooden power poles were snapped, large metal power poles were bent to the ground along the path, and the ground was heavily scoured. The same supercell thunderstorm also produced an EF2 satellite tornado that caused significant damage to a house. A weak EF0 tornado was confirmed in Nebraska later that night. Multiple other weak tornadoes touched down across the northern Great Plains on June 7 and 8 as well. Eleven tornadoes were confirmed, none of which caused any injuries or fatalities.

=== June 11–12 (Brazil and Argentina) ===
FU	F0	F1	F2	F3	F4	F5
3	0	1	4	1	1	0

A long and destructive regional tornado outbreak spawned eleven tornadoes across the brazilian province of Rio Grande do Sul and argentine province of Misiones from midnight June 11 to the early morning of June 12. Being one of the best and most impactful outbreaks ever registered in the history of South America, spawning one of the strongest tornadoes of South America in nearly a decade, also being one of the few outbreaks to have a damage survey in its wake. As a result of this outbreak, three people were killed, and another 34 were injured.

Most of the significant tornadoes were produced by a single cyclic supercell, which would produce seven tornadoes from midnight of June 11 to early morning of June 12. One of these was an F3 tornado that struck Sarandi, Brazil, where it killed one man, debarked trees, swept away wooden homes, and collapsed exterior masonry walls. The supercell's last tornado was a long-tracked F4 tornado that would cement itself as, according to PREVOTS, "one of the most intense tornadoes in RS in recent years." Near Coxilha, three trucks were overturned on a highway, and one 14-ton truck was thrown dozens of meters off the road and into a nearby field at F4 intensity. Swaths of trees were debarked, wooden homes were completely swept away, and masonry walls and homes were destroyed. Debris was wind-rowed, made into "debris missiles" that penetrated concrete walls, and lofted up to 70 kilometres (43 mi) away. Ten aviaries were also destroyed, killing hundreds of thousands of chickens. This was the first violent tornado in Brazil in nearly a decade, although its rating is disputed. Researchers from the Federal University of Santa Maria rated this tornado F3 while meteorologists from MetSul Meteorologia and PREVOTS rated the same tornado F4, although UFSM researchers warned that their damage analysis may underestimate the tornado's actual intensity. Therefore, MetSul and PREVOTS analysis is preferred.

One unrated tornado would also touch down in Argentina, killing one person in Alem on the early morning of June 12. Although no official rating was given, its wind speeds were estimated at over 200 km/h (120 mph), or approximately F2 intensity on the Fujita scale.

=== June 13 (United States and Canada) ===
EFU	EF0	EF1	EF2	EF3	EF4	EF5
0	2	1	2	0	0	0

During the evening hours of June 13, two strong EF2 tornadoes caused major damage in northeastern Pennsylvania. The first tornado struck Franklin Township in Bradford County, where multiple homes were heavily damaged or destroyed, trailers were tossed, and many trees were snapped or uprooted. The second tornado was a damaging high-end EF2 that touched down in Wilkes-Barre, damaging or destroying numerous businesses, tossing vehicles, snapping power poles, and injuring 6 people. An EF1 tornado also downed many trees near Gallitzin, Pennsylvania. Farther south, an EF0 tornado caused minimal damage to a pumping station near Little Dixie, Arkansas as well, while another weak tornado remained over an open field near Canal Point, Florida, causing no damage.

=== June 26–29 (United States) ===
EFU	EF0	EF1	EF2	EF3	EF4	EF5
1	23	11	3	2	0	0

Following the issuance of an enhanced risk of severe weather by the Storm Prediction Center, multiple tornadoes occurred across portions of the Great Plains and Great Lakes regions on June 26. An EF1 tornado touched down in the northeastern suburbs of Louisville, Kentucky, downing trees onto homes and causing considerable damage to a few businesses. Another EF1 tornado caused mostly minor damage to buildings in downtown Manhattan, Illinois, while a destructive EF3 struck the town of Eureka, Kansas. 175 homes and businesses were damaged or destroyed in Eureka, and eight people were injured. A few weak tornadoes occurred on June 27 in parts of the Upper Ohio Valley before another wave of significant tornado activity affected the Northern Great Plains on June 28. This included a large EF3 tornado that touched down near Capitol, Montana and passed near Camp Crook, South Dakota, destroying a home, outbuildings, and multiple pieces of farm machinery. Two EF2 tornadoes also caused damage near Camp Crook as well. A few additional tornadoes occurred across the same region on June 29, including an EF2 that touched down near Winger, Minnesota. An EF1 tornado in western South Dakota downed numerous trees at Spearfish Canyon as well. A total of 40 tornadoes were confirmed as a result of this outbreak, which caused 8 injuries.

=== June 29 (Japan) ===
On June 29, a strong tornado touched down in Japan, striking the central Honshu city of Maibara, Shiga Prefecture. According to a Japan Meteorological Agency confirmed report, the tornado produced F2-level damage along its path. Roofs were ripped off of well-built homes, vehicles were damaged, windows were shattered, power poles were downed, and large amounts of scaffolding was destroyed at a construction site. A temple in Maibara was severely damaged when the roof of a nearby building was blown off and thrown into the structure. A Maibara city government report confirmed that 38 houses were severely damaged, while 102 houses sustained minor damage. A total of eight people were injured by the tornado.

== July ==
=== July 10 (United States) ===
EFU	EF0	EF1	EF2	EF3	EF4	EF5
0	1	0	1	0	0	0

During the early morning hours of July 10, a brief but strong EF2 tornado struck the Prairie View RV Park on the south side of Watford City, North Dakota. The tornado was embedded in a squall line that was moving through the area, and destroyed numerous RVs, trailers, manufactured homes, and other structures along its short path. The tornado killed one newborn baby, who was only six days old, and resulted in 28 other injuries, nine of which were critical. Damage totalled $3.5 million. The tornado brought to light the poor radar coverage in the area, leading to no tornado warning being issued. In addition, a weak EF0 tornado briefly touched down near Pennsuco, Florida, causing no damage.

=== July 19–20 (United States) ===
EFU	EF0	EF1	EF2	EF3	EF4	EF5
1	16	6	2	2	0	0

During the afternoon and evening of July 19, an outbreak of 15 tornadoes impacted Iowa, a few of which were strong and destructive. The outbreak was unusual due its late-season time of occurrence, and due to the fact that it was largely unexpected. The Storm Prediction Center had only issued a slight risk with a 2% tornado risk area in the region prior to the outbreak, and it was only upped to 5% later in the day; an outbreak was never anticipated. This was due to an inaccurate analysis of a low-pressure system over the northern part of the state, which in turn caused the National Weather Service to underestimate how conducive the environment was for tornadogenesis. An EF2 tornado struck the town of Bondurant, causing heavy damage to homes, while a simultaneous and nearly identical tornado caused EF2 tree and outbuilding damage to the north of town. A powerful EF3 tornado struck the east edge of Pella, injuring 13 people and causing major structural damage to large factory buildings at the Vermeer plant, and $120 million in damages. Another damaging EF3 tornado struck downtown Marshalltown, heavily damaging or destroying numerous homes, businesses, and a Lennox International plant, and injuring 22 people, causing $200 million in damages. Several other weak tornadoes also occurred, including an EF0 tornado that caused minor tree and fence damage in Ankeny.

On July 20, the Storm Prediction Center issued a moderate risk of severe weather across parts of Indiana, Kentucky, and Tennessee. Damaging winds were the main threat, though the outlook included a 10% risk of tornadoes. Several tornadoes touched down, though all were weak. One EF1 tornado caused considerable damage to homes and barns near Corydon, Indiana, while another EF1 tornado downed trees and destroyed outbuildings in and around the town of Moonville. Thirty-two tornadoes occurred as a result of this outbreak, which resulted in 35 injuries. It also resulted in over $320 million in damages.

=== July 27–29 (United States) ===
EFU	EF0	EF1	EF2	EF3	EF4	EF5
0	3	6	2	1	0	0

Throughout a three-day period in late July, scattered tornadoes occurred across portions of the western Great Plains states, a couple of which were strong. Four weak tornadoes touched down in Colorado on July 27, including an EF1 near Byers that tore much of the roof off of a house and flipped a UPS truck, injuring the driver. Further east, another EF1 tornado caused moderate damage to trees, homes, and an elementary school at Whitemarsh Island, Georgia. On July 28, a powerful EF3 tornado moved through rural areas near Douglas, Wyoming, snapping power poles and causing major damage at a ranch in the area. Two EF2 tornadoes occurred in Colorado on July 29, including one that severely damaged the local airport in the town of Brush. Twelve tornadoes were confirmed and one person was injured.

== August ==
=== August 3 (Canada) ===
A violent EF4 tornado struck rural areas of Manitoba, Canada, on August 3—the first (and only) violent tornado in North America in 2018 and the first violent tornado in Canada since an F5 tornado struck Elie, Manitoba in 2007. The tornado first impacted areas near Alonsa and Silver Ridge, with multiple homes and mobile homes damaged or completely destroyed along this portion of the path. A couple of homes were leveled or swept away, with only the foundations left behind. Numerous vehicles, trailers, and tractors were thrown and destroyed as well. The tornado impacted Margaret Bruce Beach before dissipating over Lake Manitoba, where cabins were destroyed, RV campers and vehicles were thrown into the lake, and public restroom facility buildings were swept away with only the foundation slabs and bolted-down toilets left behind. Numerous trees were snapped, debarked, and denuded along the path, and aerial photography revealed a distinct ground scar left behind by the tornado. One person was killed near Alonsa, and two others sustained significant injuries. The tornado reached a width of 800 m (870 yd) and remained on the ground for at least 20 minutes This was the first fatal tornado in Canada since the 2011 Goderich, Ontario tornado. This would also be the last violent (EF4 or higher) tornado in Canada until 2023. It was also tied for the strongest tornado of 2018 with an F4 tornado in Brazil.

=== August 5 (Haiti) ===
An extremely rare tornado caused major damage in the town of Fonds-Verrettes, in southeastern Haiti. Three people were injured by the tornado, and at least 30 families were left homeless. 27 homes were damaged, while seven were completely destroyed.

=== August 12 (China) ===
The first ever documented tornado outbreak in Chinese history occurred as a result of Tropical Storm Yagi (2018), which produced 11 tornadoes.

=== August 19 (China) ===
A short-lived but intense EF3 struck the Linyi, Shandong area on August 19, completely destroying a house and inflicting significant damage to several others. Power poles and trees were snapped, cars were thrown and damaged, and severe crop damage occurred in farm fields. At least three people were injured by the tornado, which was spawned by an embedded supercell from the outer bands of Tropical Storm Rumbia and had a visible hook-echo on radar.

=== August 24 (Iceland) ===
A rare, high-end F1/T3 tornado struck the Norðurhjáleiga farm in South Iceland, causing extensive damage. The tornado damaged roofs, downed fences, and tossed a jeep and trailer into a ditch. No casualties were reported.

=== August 28 (United States) ===
EFU	EF0	EF1	EF2	EF3	EF4	EF5
0	8	15	1	0	0	0

A moderate outbreak of mostly weak tornadoes occurred across the Great Lakes region of the United States during late afternoon and evening of August 28. A majority of these tornadoes touched down in Wisconsin, and were embedded within a line of severe thunderstorms that moved across the southern portion of the state. An EF1 tornado stuck community of Alto, destroying large outbuildings, damaging trees and power poles, and causing considerable damage to farmsteads in the area. Three separate EF1 tornadoes caused damage to barns, trees, and homes in and around South Byron. The strongest tornado of the event was an EF2 that touched down in Brownsville, snapping numerous large trees, destroying a large barn, and toppling a large communications tower to the ground outside of town. A separate EF1 tornado also impacted Brownsville simultaneously, damaging trees and power poles in town. A few additional tornadoes also occurred in Iowa and Michigan, including an EF1 that heavily damaged a house near West Branch, Michigan. In addition to the tornadoes, the severe thunderstorms produced numerous reports of significant straight-line wind damage across the region. Damage to trees and agriculture across southern Wisconsin was severe. A total of 24 tornadoes were confirmed, none of which resulted in any fatalities or injuries.

== September ==
=== September 3–7 (North Korea) ===
An apparent tornado in North Korea occurred west of Samsa Station in Paegam County. This tornado carved a 1.8 kilometres (1.1 mi) path through a forest, which was found via satellite imagery. The exact date of this tornado is unknown, but it is suspected to have occurred between September 3–7.

=== September 3 (Canada) ===
EFU	EF0	EF1	EF2	EF3	EF4	EF5
0	0	0	1	0	0	0

An exceptionally rare EF2 touched down in rural Labrador, snapping and uprooting many trees just south of Wabush, where it briefly became a waterspout as it moved over Rectangle Lake. This was the first tornado ever confirmed in Labrador, and the strongest confirmed in Newfoundland and Labrador.

=== September 13–17 (Hurricane Florence) ===
EFU	EF0	EF1	EF2	EF3	EF4	EF5
0	22	15	1	0	0	0

Over a five-day period, the approach and landfall of Hurricane Florence produced numerous tornadoes that impacted the states of North Carolina, South Carolina and Virginia, almost all of which were weak. Most of the damage from these tornadoes was limited to trees, though minor structural damage also occurred. The only strong tornado that occurred was a damaging EF2 that struck Midlothian, Virginia on September 17, damaging or destroying businesses, flipping vehicles, and damaging homes. The tornado caused one death, a 60-year-old flooring warehouse employee who died when the building completely collapsed. Sixteen other people were injured, including fifteen warehouse employees. The Midlothian tornado was one of seven that impacted the Greater Richmond Region that day, though the other six tornadoes were weak, ranging from EF0 to EF1 in intensity. A total of 38 tornadoes were confirmed.

=== September 14 (Philippines) ===
An EF1 tornado spawned by Typhoon Mangkhut (Ompong) struck multiple areas in Marikina at around 17:00 PhST. Multiple structures including the Marikina Shoe Museum and Kapitan Moy Residence were left partially damaged and Uprooted a century-old tree. It damaged several houses and 2 people were injured after being electrocuted by a live wire.

=== September 20–21 (United States and Canada) ===
EFU	EF0	EF1	EF2	EF3	EF4	EF5
0	10	19	7	1	0	0

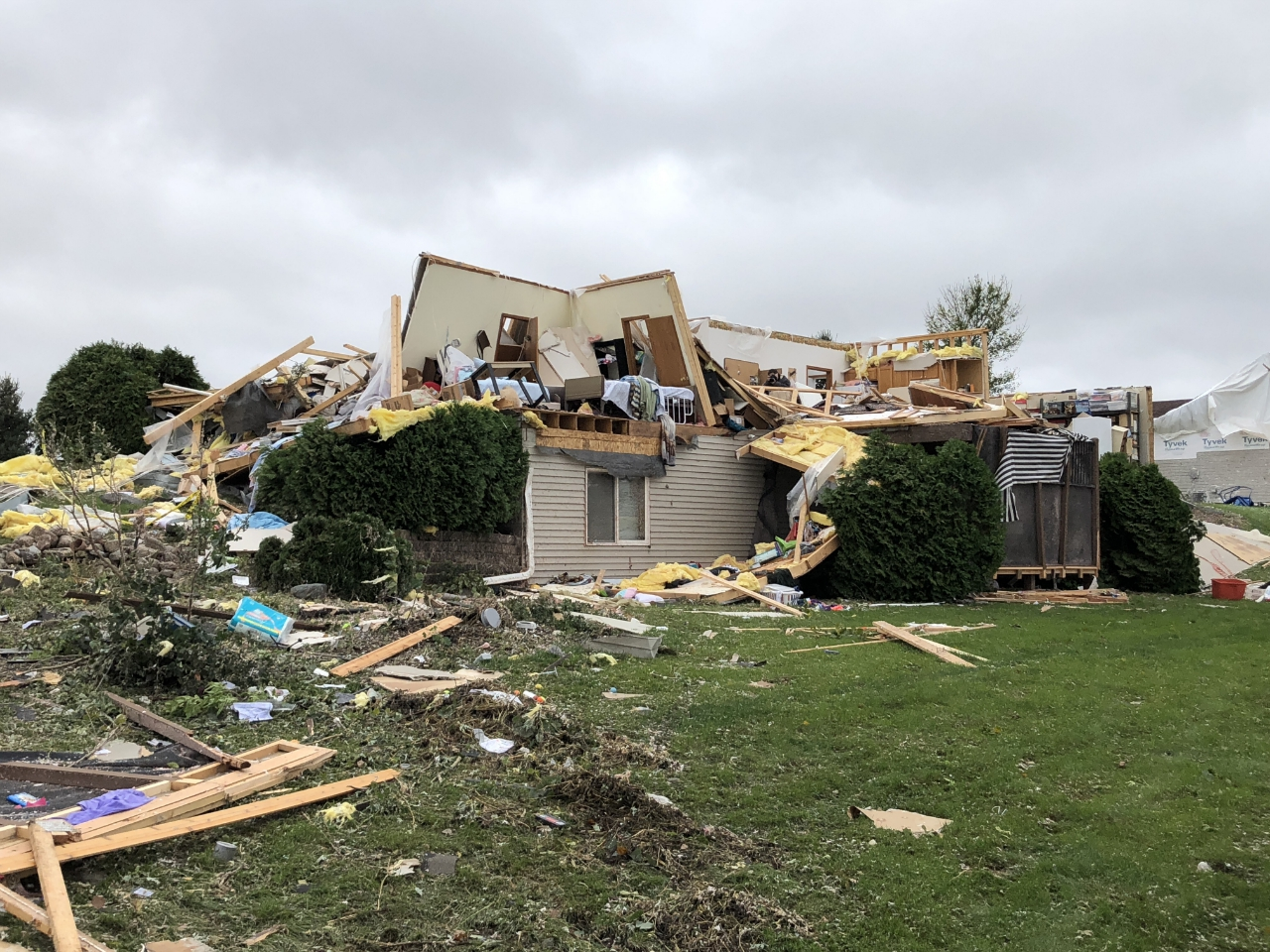
High-end EF2 damage to a house in Morristown, Minnesota.

The Storm Prediction Center issued an enhanced risk of severe weather for portions of the Great Lakes region of the United States on September 20. This outlook included a 10% hatched risk area for tornadoes. A line of severe thunderstorms with numerous embedded tornadoes impacted the region that evening. The most significant tornado that occurred that evening was a high-end EF2 that struck Morristown, Minnesota, heavily damaging or destroying multiple homes in town. Twenty-five tornadoes touched down in Minnesota alone, making September 20, 2018 the third-most prolific tornado day in state history.

A localized but damaging outbreak of tornadoes impacted eastern Ontario and southern Quebec on the afternoon of September 21 as tornadic supercells moved through the area. The National Capital Region of Canada incurred the most significant damage from the event. A high-end EF3 tornado damaged or destroyed hundreds of structures and vehicles, and injured numerous people as it struck Dunrobin, Ontario and Gatineau, Quebec. A high-end EF2 that moved through the Nepean area also caused significant damage to many homes, and downed numerous trees along its path. Four other EF2 tornadoes were also confirmed, including one that struck Calabogie, Ontario, snapping numerous trees and destroying a garage structure. Another EF2 damaged homes and downed many trees in the Val-des-Bois, Quebec area. Multiple reports of hail and damaging straight-line winds were also received as a result of the storms, and 272,000 people were left without power. A total of 37 tornadoes were confirmed as a result of this outbreak, and 31 people were injured, five critically.

== October ==
=== October 2 (United States) ===
EFU	EF0	EF1	EF2	EF3	EF4	EF5
0	6	9	4	0	0	0

The Storm Prediction Center issued a slight risk for severe weather for most of Pennsylvania, along with parts of Ohio, New York, and New Jersey on October 2, 2018. This included a 5% risk of tornadoes. Later that day, numerous supercell thunderstorms overspread the region and began producing tornadoes. The most significant tornadoes of the event occurred in Pennsylvania, including an EF2 that severely damaged buildings at a nursing home facility in Conneautville, injuring one person. Two additional EF2 tornadoes downed countless trees in heavily forested areas near Hartsfield and Donegal Township. Near Brookville, another EF2 tornado caused significant damage to a cemetery, numerous trees, and two homes. Additional weak tornadoes caused damage in upstate New York and in Connecticut as well. A total of 14 tornadoes touched down in Pennsylvania, making this outbreak the largest tornado event to occur in the state during the month of October, and largest tornado outbreak in the state in over 20 years. A total of 19 tornadoes were confirmed overall, and one person was injured.

=== October 11 (Australia) ===
A severe spring storm outbreak in eastern Queensland, Australia resulted in one confirmed but possibly up to three tornadoes. Several houses were badly damaged and many sheds and outbuildings destroyed when a tornado hit Tansey, north-west of Brisbane. A possible tornado passed south-east of Kingaroy, damaging property at Coolabunia. Straight-line winds and hail of up to 7 cm (2.8 in) from the same storm caused extensive damage to fruit crops and livestock and injured four people. A third suspected but unconfirmed tornado occurred north of Gympie. Damaging supercells were recorded from Dalby north to Blackwater during the event.

=== October 12 (India) ===
A Multi-Vortex tornado hit Kharagpur, West Bengal and snapped power lines, downed trees, and caused significant damage to homes. There was a lot of footage of the tornado destroying trees and houses, most of it was posted on Facebook. The tornado was caused by Cyclone Titli.

=== October 13 (Hurricane Sergio) ===
EFU	EF0	EF1	EF2	EF3	EF4	EF5
0	10	1	1	0	0	0

Twelve tornadoes occurred in Texas and Arizona as a result of the increased moisture from Hurricane Sergio. An EF2 tornado near Christoval extensively damaged a metal building and either uprooted or snapped many trees, causing US$200,000 in damage. In Brady, an EF0 tornado uprooted one tree, which caused another to fall on a home, which triggered roof damage, resulting in US$150,000 in damage. Approximately US$25,000 in damage occurred near Sardis when an EF0 tornado damaged a corner of a gymnasium, broke out windows on cars, bent down light-poles and handicap signs in a parking lot, and threw a trailer into a nearby field. Two tornadoes occurred near Chat. The first was an EF0 tornado that damaged a few trees as well as shingles and fences at multiple homes, generating US$15,000 in damage. The second was an EF1 tornado that substantially damaged one home, damaged the roof and deck of another, destroyed a shed, and tossed a boat and RV trailer, resulting in about US$50,000 in damage. An EF0 tornado near Brandon caused about US$5,000 in tree damage. At least four more EF0 tornadoes occurred: (Note: No significant damage was reported.) two in Navarro County, one in Freestone County, and one in Panola County. Two EF0 tornadoes were confirmed in rural parts of Arizona, neither of which caused any damage.

=== October 31 – November 2 (United States) ===
EFU	EF0	EF1	EF2	EF3	EF4	EF5
0	13	40	8	0	0	0

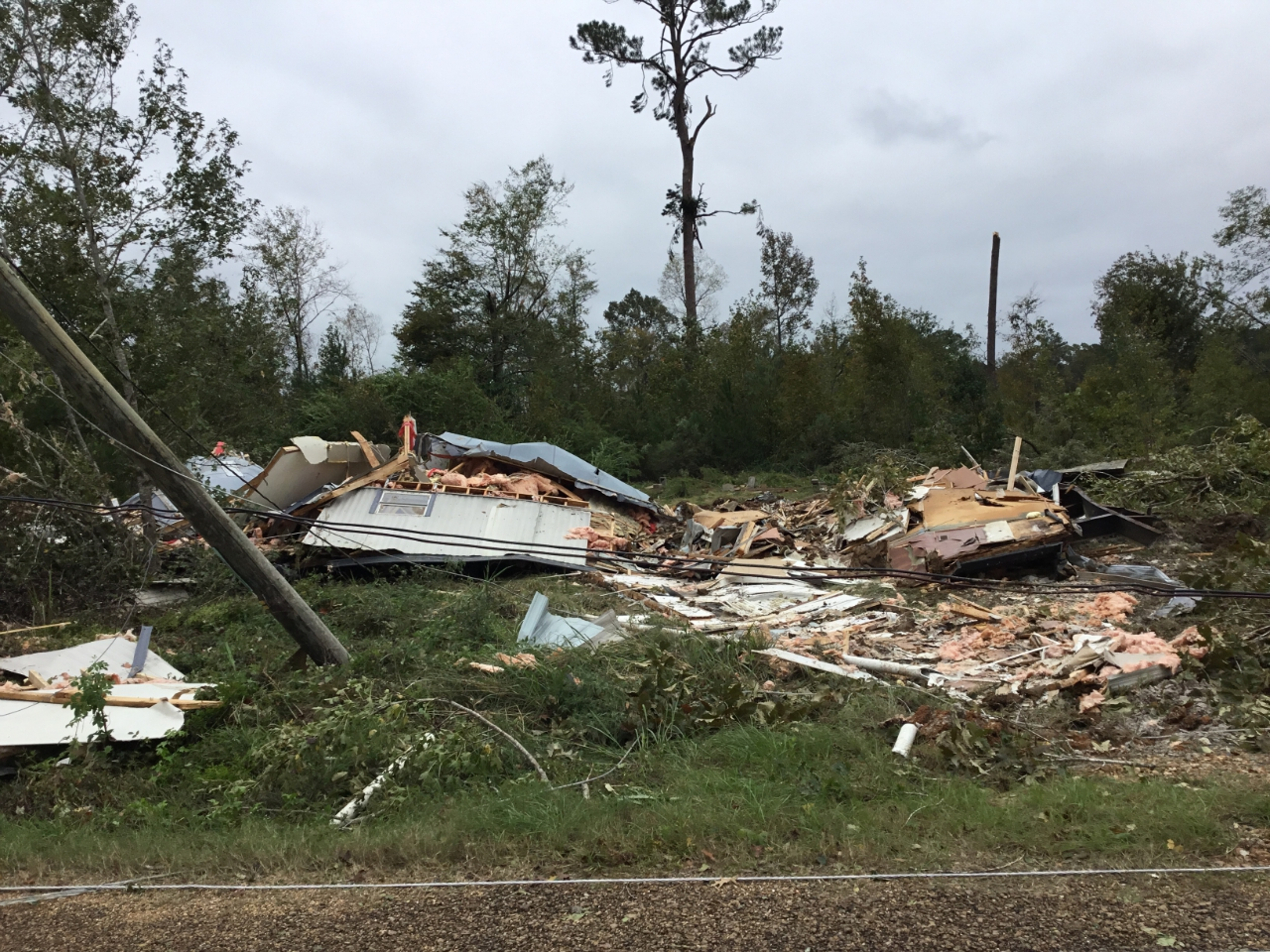
EF2 damage to a mobile home near Trout, Louisiana.

On October 31, the Storm Prediction Center issued an enhanced risk of severe weather for eastern Texas, much of Louisiana, and southwestern Mississippi. This included a 10% hatched risk area for tornadoes. Later that night, a line of severe storms with multiple embedded tornadoes moved through the region. In Texas, the towns of Cushing, Evadale, and Angleton all sustained minor to moderate damage from weak tornadoes. A supercell thunderstorm that developed ahead of the main line produced a long-tracked EF2 tornado that touched down in Alexandria, Louisiana, where several businesses sustained significant damage before the tornado continued through rural areas to the northeast, destroying multiple mobile homes, causing additional damage in Trout, and injuring two people. Severe weather spread eastward throughout the region into the early morning hours of November 1, and numerous tornadoes touched down. Strong EF2 tornadoes caused damage near the Louisiana towns of Oakdale, Cheneyville, Bogalusa, and Varnado. In Mississippi, an EF1 tornado caused minor to moderate damage in Port Gibson. North of town, a second EF1 tornado resulted in an indirect fatality when a car drove into a falling tree. An EF2 tore most of the roof off of a house and snapped power poles in Morgantown as well. On November 2, despite only a marginal risk being issued by the Storm Prediction Center, scattered tornadoes continued further east in the Mid-Atlantic region and southward into Florida. Mild air being pushed into the Mid-Atlantic led to the warmest ever low temperature in November in Atlantic City on record, at 66 °F (19 °C). An EF1 touched down in Baltimore, Maryland, where a wall collapse at an Amazon warehouse killed two employees. This became the first fatal tornado in Maryland since the 2002 La Plata tornado, as well as the first fatal tornado in Maryland in fall or winter. An EF2 tornado tore the roof off of a house, damaged two other homes, and caused major tree damage near Crystal Hill, Virginia as well. In Florida, a few weak tornadoes also caused damage. Sixty-one tornadoes were confirmed as a result of this outbreak, which killed two people directly and resulted in a third indirect death. There were also 7 injuries, plus 2 indirect injuries, and a total of $8.2 million in damage.

== November ==
=== November 5–6 (United States) ===
EFU	EF0	EF1	EF2	EF3	EF4	EF5
0	9	13	5	0	0	0

Following the issuance of an enhanced risk of severe weather from the Storm Prediction Center, which included a 10% hatched risk area for tornadoes, a moderate outbreak of tornadoes impacted the Southern United States on the evening of November 5. The strongest tornadoes of the event occurred in Louisiana, Mississippi, and Tennessee. An EF2 tornado near Marthaville, Louisiana snapped multiple trees and power poles, and tore much of the roof off of a home. Another EF2 near Clarence snapped numerous trees and power poles as well, and tossed vehicle trailers. In Tupelo, Mississippi, an EF2 tornado caused significant structural damage to several homes and an assisted living facility, injuring one person. Tornadic activity intensified and pushed into the Middle Tennessee region by the early morning hours of November 6; a high-end EF2 tornado near Christiana destroyed several homes, including a poorly anchored house that was flipped completely upside-down, killing one person inside. A long-tracked, high-end EF2 also touched down near Winchester before lifting to the northeast of Pelham, damaging or destroying numerous homes, mobile homes, and outbuildings. Thousands of trees were downed along the path as well. An EF1 tornado also caused considerable damage to a sports complex in Loretto, Tennessee. A total of 27 tornadoes were confirmed as a result of this outbreak, which resulted in one fatality and four injuries.

=== November 17–18 (Indonesia) ===
FU	F0	F1	F2	F3	F4	F5
4	0	0	0	0	0	0

From November 17 to November 18, a series of damaging tornadoes struck various areas in Indonesia. The first tornado of the event struck Dawuhan, Sirampog, Brebes on November 17 at around 16.00 PM in West Indonesian Time around afternoon. The tornado caused damage to 16 homes and a gymnasium, with damage to the structures ranging from minor exterior damage to total roof loss. The next day, a rain-wrapped tornado struck Sumbermalang, Situbondo regency, causing significant damage to 270 houses and a school building as it moved through the villages of Baderane and Taman Kursi. Many trees were also snapped by the tornado, which was accompanied by hail. At same time that the Taman Kursi tornado was causing damage, a separate tornado touched down in Karanganyar, causing damage to three houses and one cattle pen in the Wukirsawit area. Later that evening, another tornado caused extensive damage in Sidoarjo Regency, with damage to 372 houses in Kajeksan, 22 houses in Kepunten, 26 houses in Kemantren, 11 houses in Grinting, 8 houses in Grabagan, 7 houses in Singopadu, and 1 house in Kepadangan. A total of four tornadoes were confirmed, none of which resulted in any fatalities despite the extensive damage. None of the tornadoes were given intensity ratings.

=== November 18 (New Zealand) ===
A large landspout tornado was caught on video from multiple angles as it touched down in New Zealand's South Island near the South Canterbury town of Ashburton. The tornado remained mainly over open farm fields, though some damage to trees and farm implements occurred. The storm system that spawned the tornado also produced storms that lashed parts of the Canterbury region with marble-sized hail and strong winds.

=== November 25 (Italy) ===
FU	F0	F1	F2	F3	F4	F5
0	1	3	2	0	0	0

On November 25, a small tornado outbreak impacted Italy. Seven tornadoes were confirmed, including an F2 that struck Crotone, where industrial buildings and businesses were badly damaged or destroyed, vehicles were thrown and piled atop each other, trees and signs were downed, a shopping mall was damaged, and one person was injured. An F0 badly damaged a service station near San Pancrazio Salentino, while an F1 damaged structures at a dairy farm and uprooted trees near Rocca di Neto, tossing several trailers and heavily damaging other farm buildings as well. An F1 also caused damage to structures near Cropani, and another F1 struck a neighborhood in the far southeastern part of Cutro, damaging roofs and trees. An F2 multiple-vortex tornado developed over water, made landfall and tracked through southeastern Apulia along a 12.5 miles long path, striking the southern fringes of Tricase and causing heavy damage to homes and trees, destroying the brick exterior wall of a church and a building at a soccer field, and damaging vehicles. The Tricase tornado was also accompanied by a small satellite waterspout that dissipated before coming ashore.

=== November 30 – December 2 (United States) ===
EFU	EF0	EF1	EF2	EF3	EF4	EF5
0	20	22	5	2	0	0

On November 30, the Storm Prediction Center issued an enhanced risk of severe weather for parts of Texas, Oklahoma, Louisiana, and Arkansas, including a 10% hatched risk for tornadoes. Later that afternoon and evening, several tornadoes occurred in Oklahoma and Arkansas, including a long-tracked EF2 that caused severe damage and five injuries near Tenkiller Ferry Lake in Oklahoma. Another EF2 caused major damage to homes in Van Buren, Arkansas. An EF1 tornado also caused a fatality at a motel in Aurora, Missouri during the very early morning hours of December 1. Following the outbreak the previous day in Oklahoma, Arkansas, and Missouri, a slight risk with a 5% risk of tornadoes was issued for a large portion of Illinois. A geographically concentrated outbreak of tornadoes occurred in central and western Illinois on the first day of meteorological winter, including an EF3 wedge that caused major structural damage to homes and businesses in Taylorville, injuring 22 people. An EF1 caused moderate damage in Beardstown, while EF2 tornadoes tore roofs off homes near Litchfield and Le Roy. Another EF2 touched down in Stonington as well. Additional isolated tornado activity occurred across portions of the Southern United States on December 2, including a large EF3 tornado that struck the Naval Submarine Base Kings Bay, tossing heavy objects and injuring four people. This event was the largest December outbreak in the history of Illinois by number of confirmed tornadoes, with a total count of 29. A total of 49 tornadoes were confirmed overall as a result of this outbreak, which resulted in one fatality and 32 injuries.

=== November 30 (Brazil) ===
A rain-wrapped tornado struck the city of Itaperuçu, Paraná, damaging or destroying more than 300 masonry residences, health centers, public schools and killing two people. A car was also thrown against the wall of a house. Simepar rated the tornado an F1, but the PREVOTS research group gave it an F2 rating.

== December ==
=== December 6 (Indonesia) ===
On December 6, a damaging multi-vortex tornado struck the Indonesian city of Bogor, resulting in damage to 850 homes. The tornado downed many trees, and caused one death when a tree fell onto a car.

=== December 18 (Washington) ===
On December 18, an unusually strong and damaging tornado struck the town of Port Orchard, Washington. The large EF2 tornado heavily damaged many homes and several businesses, and downed hundreds of trees and power lines. Homes had their roofs torn off, and a dry storage facility was destroyed. This tornado was the strongest to occur in the state of Washington since 1986. Tornadoes do occasionally occur in the Pacific Northwest, though they are usually weak, and strong tornadoes such as this one are very uncommon for the region.

=== December 31 (Indonesia) ===
A tornado struck Panguragan, Indonesia, located to the northwest of Cirebon on December 31, causing minor damage to 165 homes and killing one child.

== See also ==
- Weather of 2018
- Tornado
  - Tornadoes by year
  - Tornado records
  - Tornado climatology
  - Tornado myths
- List of tornado outbreaks
  - List of F5 and EF5 tornadoes
  - List of F4 and EF4 tornadoes
  - List of North American tornadoes and tornado outbreaks
  - List of 21st-century Canadian tornadoes and tornado outbreaks
  - List of European tornadoes and tornado outbreaks
  - List of tornadoes and tornado outbreaks in Asia
  - List of Southern Hemisphere tornadoes and tornado outbreaks
  - List of tornadoes striking downtown areas
  - List of tornadoes with confirmed satellite tornadoes
- Tornado intensity
  - Fujita scale
  - Enhanced Fujita scale
  - International Fujita scale
  - TORRO scale
