= April 2018 North American storm complex =

Weather event in the United States and Canada

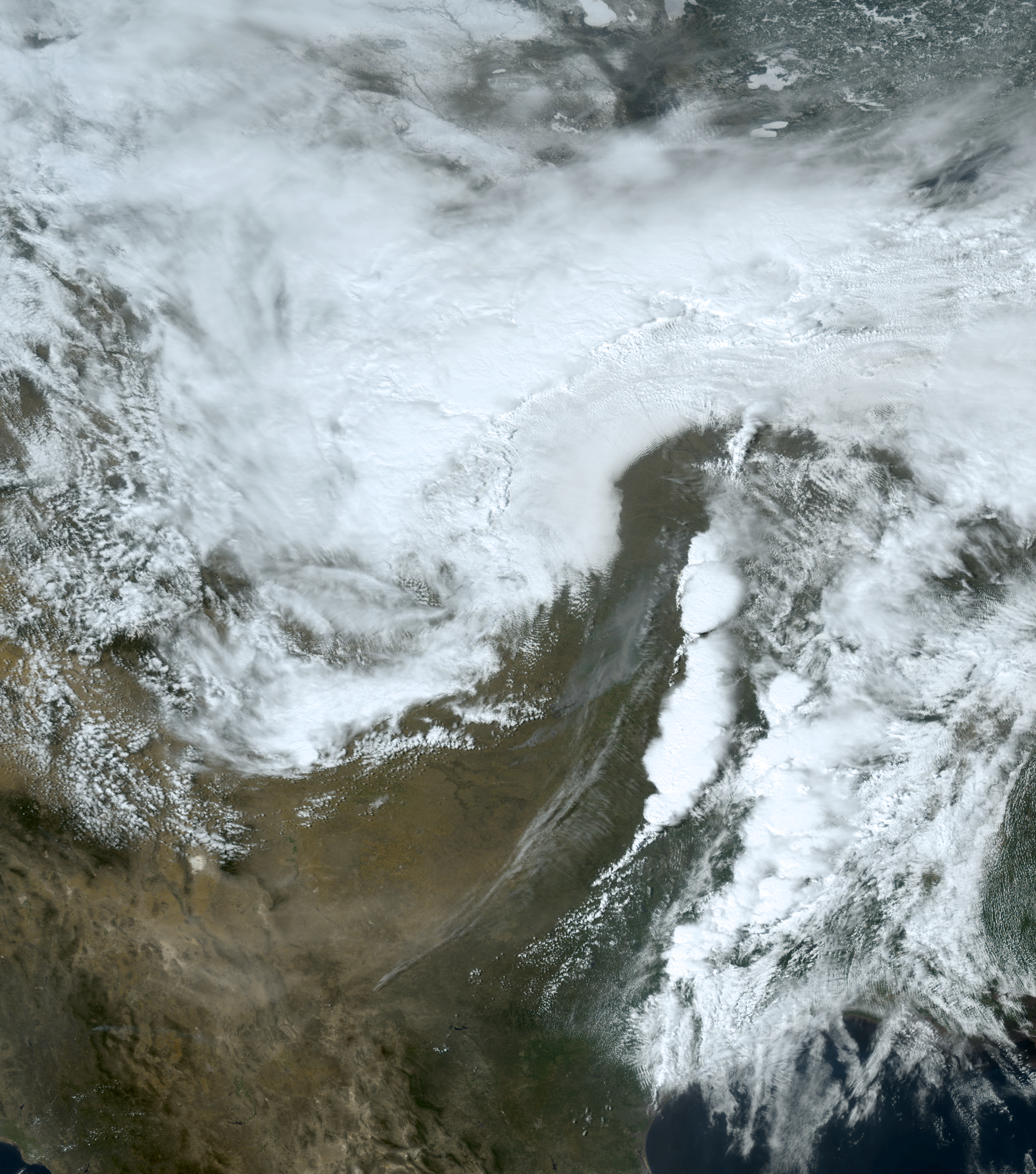
- True-color imagery of the extratropical cyclone and its resultant convection on April 13

Meteorological history
- Formed: April 13, 2018
- Dissipated: April 15, 2018

Category 4 "Crippling" blizzard
- Regional snowfall index: 15.70 (NOAA)
- Lowest pressure: 985 mbar (hPa); 29.09 inHg
- Max. snowfall: Snow – 33 in (84 cm) near Amherst, Wisconsin; Freezing rain – 1 in (2.5 cm) in Lowville, New York

Tornado outbreak
- Tornadoes: 73
- Max. rating: EF3 tornado
- Duration: 2 days, 5 hours, and 31 minutes
- Highest winds: Tornadic – 150 mph (240 km/h) (Elon, Virginia EF3 on April 15); Straight-line – 74 mph (119 km/h) at Columbia Metropolitan Airport
- Largest hail: 2.75 in (7.0 cm) diameter in Belmont, North Carolina

Overall effects
- Fatalities: 5 total (2 tornadic, 3 non-tornadic)
- Injuries: 29
- Damage: $1.5 billion (2022 USD)
- Areas affected: Mid-South, Southeastern United States, Mid-Atlantic, Eastern Canada
- Part of the 2017–18 North American winter and tornado outbreaks of 2018

The April 2018 North American storm complex brought a wide swath of severe and winter weather that affected much of Midwest across to the East Coast of the United States. This particular outbreak led to at least 73 confirmed tornadoes over a three-day period, most of which occurred across Arkansas and Louisiana during the evening hours of April 13. The most significant tornadoes were an EF1 tornado that caused a fatality in Red Chute, Louisiana, early on April 14, a high-end EF2 tornado that impacted eastern sections of Greensboro, North Carolina on April 15, causing 17 injuries, and a significant EF3 tornado that impacted areas from Lynchburg to Elon, Virginia, causing severe damage and at least 10 injuries.

The system also resulted in a record-breaking and severe blizzard across the Midwest into the Northeastern United States; killing three additional people and leaving hundreds of thousands without power. Snowfall amounts of up to 18–24 inches (46–61 cm), which are rarely seen in the month of April in the region were observed, shattering numerous records.

== Meteorological synopsis ==
=== April 13–14 ===
On April 8, the Storm Prediction Center (SPC) first introduced a risk of severe weather in their day 6 outlook, valid on April 13. The threat area included the South Plains and the Mid-South from northeastern Texas into southern Missouri, where maturing convection was expected to lead to all modes of severe weather. Subsequent day 5 and day 4 forecasts maintained this area with little deviation. In its day 3 outlook on April 11, the SPC issued an Enhanced risk of severe weather for areas between northeastern Texas into southwestern Missouri, noting that a supercellular storm mode was likely to produce large hail, damaging winds, and a few tornadoes. The Enhanced risk was later extended northward into southern Iowa on April 12, and by the following morning, a Moderate risk was issued across far northeastern Texas and northwestern Louisiana onward into central Arkansas. Several tornadoes, including some strong (EF2+) ones, were expected in the highest risk area. As a result, the outlook included a 15% hatched risk area for tornadoes.

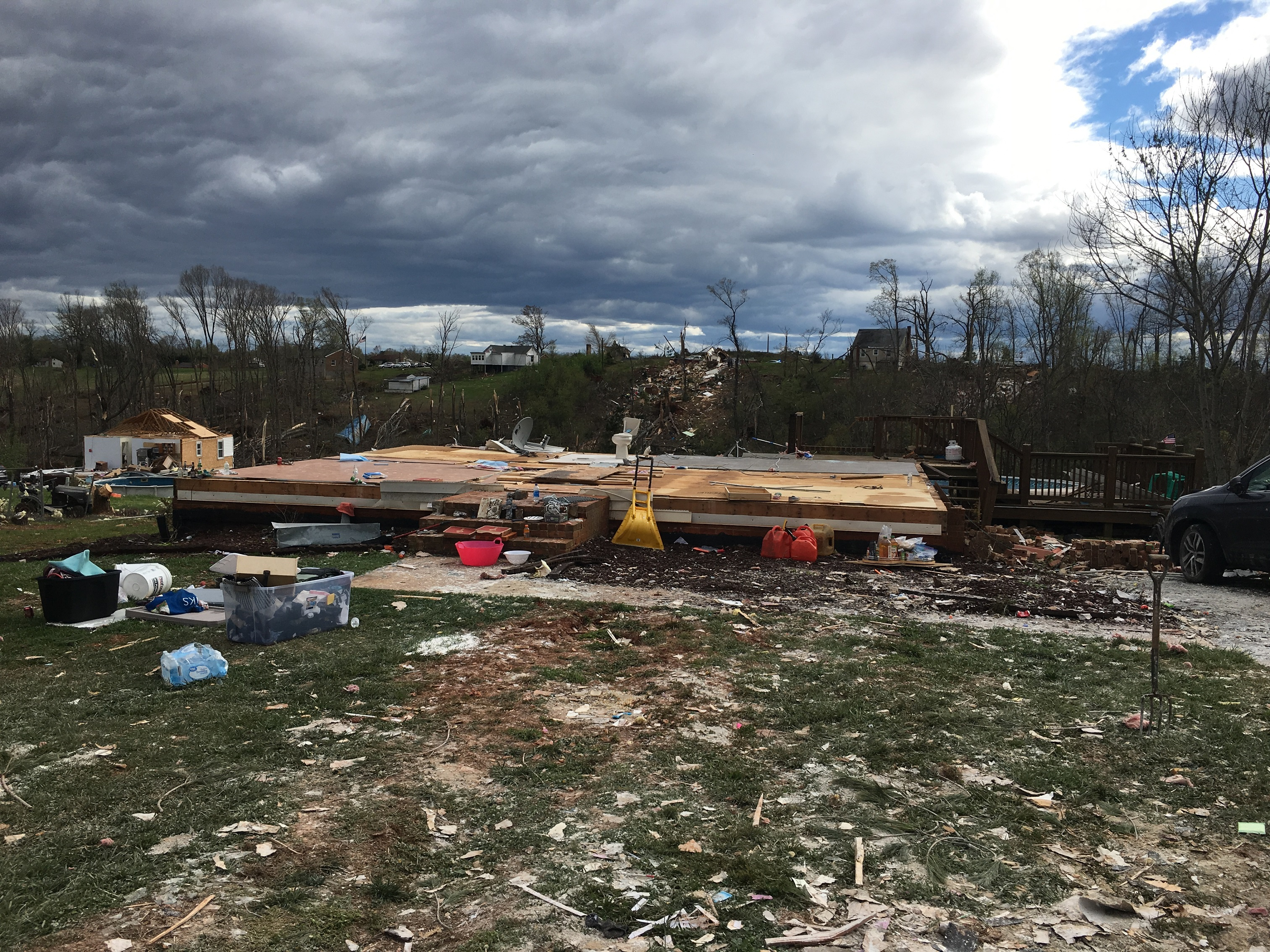
EF3 damage to a home in Elon, Virginia, on April 15.

An outbreak of tornadoes unfolded across the region as an expansive upper-level trough pushed into the Central United States, along with a 100kt jet streak pushing into Oklahoma and Missouri. A surface area of low pressure tracked from North-Central Kansas toward the Missouri-Iowa state border, supporting a warm front arced across southern Iowa, and a dryline extending from Kansas into Texas. Within the warm sector of the low, surface dewpoints rose to the mid 60s. A swath of 850mb winds at or above 50kt persisted underneath an elevated mixed layer, yielding an unstable environment characterized by mean-layer Convective Available Potential Energy (CAPE) of 1500–2500 J/kg. Throughout the afternoon, confluent low-level flow caused several discrete thunderstorms to form across Arkansas, where the SPC had issued a Particularly Dangerous Situation (PDS) tornado watch. The most significant supercell of the day developed over LeFlore County, Oklahoma and eventually progressed into Crawford County, Arkansas, where it produced a half-mile-wide EF2 tornado that caused substantial damage in and near Mountainburg.

Into the evening hours of April 13, the low-level jet kept intensified across Arkansas and Louisiana, with 850mb winds topping 60kt. Meanwhile, a cold front pushed eastward and soon overtook the dryline, forcing discrete thunderstorm activity into a quasi-linear convective system. With abundant moisture and mean-layer CAPE still on the order of 1,500–2,000 J/kg, the SPC mentioned potential for swaths of damaging winds with isolated embedded tornadoes. Around 05:10 UTC, an EF1 tornado was developed southwest of Shreveport, Louisiana and progressed directly into the city. It damaged billboards, trees, and hotels before entering Bossier City; there, several mobile homes were damaged and a shopping center was severely devastated. After entering Red Chute, the tornado downed a tree onto a travel trailer, causing one fatality inside. The fatality marked the only tornado-related fatality of the multi-day outbreak. Into the morning hours of April 14, EF2 tornadoes impacted areas near Portland, Arkansas, Carencro, Louisiana, and in Meridian, Mississippi.

=== April 15 ===
The SPC first mentioned the threat for organized severe weather across the Southeast and Mid-Atlantic regions on April 12, noting that the main threat was expected to be damaging winds. A day 3 Slight risk was outlined for central Florida northward into extreme southern Virginia the next day, with an Enhanced risk of severe weather introduced across much of South Carolina and central North Carolina during the morning hours of April 15. This outlook included a 10% risk area for tornadoes. The potent upper-level trough that sparked severe weather farther west over subsequent days began to tilt in a northwest-to-southeast fashion, forcing rapid cooling aloft and geopotential height falls over a large region. The surface low progressed from Iowa into Ohio and across the Appalachian Mountains, resulting in strong low-level flow and substantial moisture return across the severe weather risk area; dewpoints in the low to mid-60s caused an unstable atmosphere that ultimately led to a quasi-linear convective system and hundreds of damaging wind reports. Embedded semi-discrete supercell structures within this line produced several tornadoes, including EF2 ones that affected areas east of Gilbert, South Carolina and the eastern sections of Greensboro, North Carolina. Another strong tornado moved through the Virginia towns of Timberlake and Lynchburg before reaching EF3 strength as it destroyed several homes in Elon.

== Confirmed tornadoes ==
Confirmed tornadoes by Enhanced Fujita rating
EFU	EF0	EF1	EF2	EF3	EF4	EF5	Total
0	22	40	10	1	0	0	73

=== April 13 event ===
List of confirmed tornadoes – Friday, April 13, 2018 (Note: All dates are based on the local time zone where the tornado touched down; however, all times are in Coordinated Universal Time for consistency.)
EF#	Location	County / Parish	State	Start Coord.	Time (UTC)	Path length	Max width
EF2	NNE of Rudy to Mountainburg	Crawford	AR	35.5490°N 94.2621°W	21:04–21:19	11.7 mi (18.8 km)	1,000 yd (910 m)
EF2	A multiple-vortex wedge tornado touched down near Rudy and moved north-northeast before tracking into Mountainburg, where significant damage to structures occurred. Along its path, several homes were severely damaged, numerous outbuildings were completely destroyed, power poles were downed, and many trees were snapped or uprooted. Several cars were rolled off Arkansas Highway 282 and Interstate 49. Four people were injured.						
EF1	E of Lavaca	Sebastian, Franklin	AR	35.3300°N 94.1006°W	22:46–22:54	5.6 mi (9.0 km)	400 yd (370 m)
EF1	Trees were uprooted, power poles were snapped, and a mobile home was damaged.						
EF1	N of Calhoun	Ouachita	LA	32.5294°N 92.3642°W	23:34–23:38	1.72 mi (2.77 km)	600 yd (550 m)
EF1	Numerous trees and power lines were snapped or uprooted. Several houses and barn suffered severe damage, and a mobile home was flipped.						
EF1	E of Downsville	Union	LA	32.5839°N 92.3258°W	23:43–23:49	3.94 mi (6.34 km)	950 yd (870 m)
EF1	Many trees were snapped or uprooted.						
EF1	NW of Ozone	Johnson	AR	35.6662°N 93.4634°W	23:48–23:54	4.96 mi (7.98 km)	250 yd (230 m)
EF1	Numerous trees were snapped or uprooted in the Ozark–St. Francis National Forest. A power pole was snapped as well.						
EF1	WNW of Sterlington	Union	LA	32.7131°N 92.2190°W	00:04–00:06	0.38 mi (0.61 km)	200 yd (180 m)
EF1	A brief tornado snapped or uprooted trees.						
EF2	W of Umpire	Howard	AR	34.2555°N 94.067°W	00:10–00:20	2.2 mi (3.5 km)	350 yd (320 m)
EF2	Many trees were snapped or uprooted by this large multiple-vortex tornado. A metal barn was destroyed, while a second had portions of its tin roof peeled back. Two large chicken houses suffered significant roof damage, and numerous power poles were snapped.						
EF2	Macomb to NNE of Norwood	Wright	MO	37.0944°N 92.4922°W	00:13–00:23	9 mi (14 km)	100 yd (91 m)
EF2	This tornado touched down in Macomb before moving to the northeast and reaching high-end EF2 strength. A one-story home was destroyed, losing its roof and some exterior walls. Numerous trees were snapped or uprooted, and outbuildings were damaged.						
EF2	WNW of Clarks	Caldwell	LA	32.0150°N 92.2693°W	00:33–00:43	4.11 mi (6.61 km)	340 yd (310 m)
EF2	A strong tornado moved through the Catahoula National Wildlife Refuge, snapping and uprooting numerous trees. Several outbuildings and campsites were severely damaged by falling trees, and power poles were snapped.						
EF1	W of Dawson	Wright	MO	37.2543°N 92.3271°W	00:35–00:40	5 mi (8.0 km)	75 yd (69 m)
EF1	Trees and outbuildings were damaged.						
EF0	W of Pencil Bluff	Montgomery	AR	34.6296°N 93.8257°W	00:51–00:52	0.65 mi (1.05 km)	100 yd (91 m)
EF0	Trees were uprooted.						
EF1	SW of Success	Texas	MO	37.3844°N 92.1495°W	01:00–01:02	1.44 mi (2.32 km)	50 yd (46 m)
EF1	A roof, a carport, and outbuilding were damaged, and trees were snapped.						
EF1	WNW of Licking	Texas	MO	37.5234°N 91.9248°W	01:20–01:25	5.54 mi (8.92 km)	50 yd (46 m)
EF1	Numerous trees were snapped or uprooted. A house and a vacant mobile home were damaged.						
EF1	W of Gamaliel	Baxter	AR	36.4193°N 92.2605°W	01:45–01:46	0.5 mi (0.80 km)	150 yd (140 m)
EF1	A church, a garage, and outbuildings sustained damage. Several trees were snapped or uprooted.						
EF0	W of Rayville	Richland	LA	32.4512°N 91.8276°W	02:00–02:06	3.19 mi (5.13 km)	400 yd (370 m)
EF0	Several large tree branches were broken.						
EF0	SW of Oppelo	Conway	AR	35.0808°N 92.8024°W	02:13–02:14	0.16 mi (0.26 km)	100 yd (91 m)
EF0	Several trees were snapped or uprooted.						
EF1	WNW of Pioneer	Morehouse, West Carroll	LA	32.7593°N 91.607°W	02:46–02:50	1.9 mi (3.1 km)	200 yd (180 m)
EF1	An unoccupied building had portions of its metal roof ripped off, and multiple trees were uprooted or had their branches snapped.						
EF0	SE of El Paso	White	AR	35.0921°N 92.0340°W	03:13–03:14	0.09 mi (0.14 km)	80 yd (73 m)
EF0	Some trees were snapped or uprooted, and an outbuilding lost its metal roof.						
EF1	SE of Diana	Gregg, Harrison	TX	32.6345°N 94.7436°W	04:04–04:13	4.35 mi (7.00 km)	580 yd (530 m)
EF1	Several trees were snapped or uprooted, one of which landed on a shed. The roof was lifted off a hay storage shed.						
EF0	SSW of Waskom to SE of Greenwood	Harrison, Caddo	TX, LA	32.3869°N 94.1053°W	04:50–05:04	10.47 mi (16.85 km)	100 yd (91 m)
EF0	In Texas, tree limbs were snapped and the roof was blown off a small barn. In Louisiana, the tornado downed power lines and snapped or uprooted trees before dissipating.						

=== April 14 event ===
List of confirmed tornadoes – Saturday, April 14, 2018
EF#	Location	County / Parish	State	Start Coord.	Time (UTC)	Path length	Max width
EF1	SW of Shreveport to N of Princeton	Caddo, Bossier	LA	32.4521°N 93.8531°W	05:10–05:41	22.54 mi (36.27 km)	1,100 yd (1,000 m)
EF1	1 death – This large tornado touched down southwest of Shreveport and moved directly into the city, inflicting roof damage to three hotels and damaging a few billboard signs. It snapped or uprooted numerous trees in and around the downtown area before crossing into Bossier City. There, a shopping center sustained collapse of an east-facing wall, and several mobile homes were damaged by falling trees. In the Red Chute area, a tree fell onto a travel trailer and killed a two-year-old child inside. Extensive tree damage occurred further along the path before the tornado dissipated.						
EF0	Sarepta	Bossier, Webster	LA	32.8586°N 93.5162°W	05:42–05:48	5.11 mi (8.22 km)	300 yd (270 m)
EF0	Many trees were snapped or uprooted along the path, including in Sarepta.						
EF1	NW of Shongaloo	Webster	LA	32.9417°N 93.3165°W	05:58–06:04	2.93 mi (4.72 km)	500 yd (460 m)
EF1	Considerable tree damage was observed.						
EF1	NW of Homer	Claiborne	LA	32.8095°N 93.1295°W	06:11–06:19	6.85 mi (11.02 km)	1,000 yd (910 m)
EF1	Numerous trees were snapped or uprooted by this large tornado.						
EF2	E of Bryceland	Bienville	LA	32.4459°N 92.9053°W	06:47–06:53	5.38 mi (8.66 km)	210 yd (190 m)
EF2	A house had most of its roof torn off, two barns were completely destroyed, and numerous trees were snapped or uprooted.						
EF1	SE of El Dorado	Union	AR	33.1095°N 92.6548°W	06:51–07:00	7.13 mi (11.47 km)	800 yd (730 m)
EF1	The roofs of several houses were damaged, a travel trailer was rolled and destroyed, and a number of mobile homes suffered roof damage as well. Many trees were snapped or uprooted.						
EF1	S of Grambling to Ruston	Lincoln	LA	32.4827°N 92.7249°W	07:00–07:08	6.45 mi (10.38 km)	470 yd (430 m)
EF1	Numerous trees were snapped or uprooted. Many homes had their metal roofs peeled away or were damaged by fallen trees.						
EF1	E of El Dorado	Union	AR	33.1878°N 92.5317°W	07:03–07:09	5.11 mi (8.22 km)	1,200 yd (1,100 m)
EF1	This large tornado downed many trees, with some trees landing on structures and causing damage. The roofs of a number of homes, mobile homes, and barns were damaged.						
EF1	Choudrant	Lincoln	LA	32.5336°N 92.5386°W	07:14–07:21	4.6 mi (7.4 km)	865 yd (791 m)
EF1	Trees were snapped or uprooted in and around Choudrant.						
EF1	SE of Downsville	Lincoln, Ouachita, Union	LA	32.5754°N 92.4159°W	07:24–07:34	7.31 mi (11.76 km)	1,545 yd (1,413 m)
EF1	A large tornado snapped or uprooted many trees, including a 100-year-old tree that landed on a home.						
EF1	S of Crossett	Ashley	AR	33.017°N 92.0066°W	07:42–07:47	2.72 mi (4.38 km)	600 yd (550 m)
EF1	Many large trees were snapped or uprooted, some of which landed on homes and caused significant damage. Several other houses sustained shingle damage as well.						
EF1	E of Crossett	Ashley	AR	33.1205°N 91.8961°W	07:53–07:58	4.05 mi (6.52 km)	300 yd (270 m)
EF1	A significant number of trees were snapped or uprooted, and a few small sheds were damaged.						
EF1	E of Mer Rouge	Morehouse	LA	32.7693°N 91.7307°W	08:21–08:25	3.18 mi (5.12 km)	200 yd (180 m)
EF1	A small shed was blown across a road, another shed was destroyed, and a third shed was damaged. A mobile home sustained damage to its roof and skirting, and a farm outbuilding had its front facade pushed in and had substantial loss of roof panels. Trees were snapped or uprooted, and a fence was toppled.						
EF2	NNE of Portland	Ashley, Chicot	AR	33.267°N 91.5019°W	08:22–08:34	8.88 mi (14.29 km)	700 yd (640 m)
EF2	A silo had its top ripped off and structure bent, and power poles were snapped. A travel trailer was destroyed, a house lost most of its roof, and a couple of businesses sustained mostly minor damage. Several other homes and mobile homes sustained less severe damage, and numerous trees were snapped or uprooted along the path.						
EF0	WNW of Forest	West Carroll	LA	32.8095°N 91.5677°W	08:33–08:36	2.38 mi (3.83 km)	200 yd (180 m)
EF0	A barn sustained roof damage, multiple trees were damaged, and a storage shed was destroyed. Another small storage shed was turned on its side and pushed over against a mobile home.						
EF0	WNW of Pioneer	West Carroll	LA	32.8616°N 91.5219°W	08:36–08:42	4.42 mi (7.11 km)	200 yd (180 m)
EF0	Multiple trees were snapped or uprooted. A mobile home sustained roof damage.						
EF1	SE of Abbeville	Lafayette	MS	34.4462°N 89.4618°W	09:48–09:49	0.8 mi (1.3 km)	150 yd (140 m)
EF1	Three small outbuildings were destroyed. The roofs of several homes and farm buildings were damaged. Several trees were uprooted.						
EF0	ENE of Oxford	Lafayette	MS	34.3862°N 89.4628°W	09:49–09:50	0.5 mi (0.80 km)	40 yd (37 m)
EF0	Several trees were uprooted, and minor roof damage to homes occurred.						
EF1	SW of Grand Prairie	St. Landry	LA	30.6423°N 92.1904°W	11:03–11:05	1.25 mi (2.01 km)	580 yd (530 m)
EF1	One home had its roof destroyed while several others suffered minor damage. Multiple trees were snapped.						
EF2	N of Carencro	Lafayette	LA	30.3459°N 92.048°W	11:37–11:40	4.13 mi (6.65 km)	650 yd (590 m)
EF2	Numerous homes and businesses were damaged, a large advertising billboard was toppled, and multiple trees were downed. A metal outbuilding and an RV were rolled.						
EF1	N of Flowood	Rankin	MS	32.3341°N 90.1065°W	12:44–12:55	6.21 mi (9.99 km)	50 yd (46 m)
EF1	A tornado caused scattered damage near the Jackson–Medgar Wiley Evers International Airport, mainly to the roofs of homes. Trees were snapped and uprooted as well.						
EF0	ENE of Oak Hills Place	East Baton Rouge	LA	30.3893°N 91.0616°W	13:13–13:15	1.5 mi (2.4 km)	50 yd (46 m)
EF0	The doors of several metal buildings were bent or blown in; minor roof damage occurred as well. Several trees were downed.						
EF0	N of Greensburg	St. Helena	LA	30.9703°N 90.7013°W	13:20–13:21	0.08 mi (0.13 km)	20 yd (18 m)
EF0	Two large trees were uprooted while a third was twisted and snapped.						
EF0	NW of Arcola	St. Helena, Tangipahoa	LA	30.7988°N 90.613°W	13:35–13:40	6.15 mi (9.90 km)	120 yd (110 m)
EF0	Large trees were uprooted, some shingles were ripped from a house, and small canopies and trampolines were mangled.						
EF0	E of Arcola	Tangipahoa	LA	30.7811°N 90.5375°W	13:38–13:40	3.6 mi (5.8 km)	25 yd (23 m)
EF0	Small trees sustained minor damage.						
EF0	S of Bayou Vista	St. Mary	LA	29.6816°N 91.2742°W	14:13–14:14	0.3 mi (0.48 km)	40 yd (37 m)
EF0	A hotel had a section of its roof uplifted, and multiple windows were broken.						
EF1	SW of Noxapater	Winston	MS	32.9569°N 89.1021°W	14:23–14:25	0.81 mi (1.30 km)	150 yd (140 m)
EF1	Some tin was ripped from a large shed, several trees were snapped or uprooted, and part of the roof was ripped from a home.						
EF1	ESE of Columbia	Lamar	MS	31.1644°N 89.6325°W	15:07–15:15	6.08 mi (9.78 km)	200 yd (180 m)
EF1	Trees were snapped along the path.						
EF0	SE of Starkville	Oktibbeha	MS	33.3303°N 88.7621°W	15:08–15:10	2.17 mi (3.49 km)	200 yd (180 m)
EF0	A metal awning was damaged and some boats were tossed at a marina. A couple of trees were downed, including one that fell on a house.						
EF2	Meridian	Lauderdale	MS	32.3558°N 88.7321°W	15:43–15:53	8.49 mi (13.66 km)	780 yd (710 m)
EF2	This damaging tornado developed along the leading edge of a squall line and moved directly through Meridian. A two-story apartment building had its roof torn off, power poles were snapped, and a building at Magnolia Middle School had a large portion of its roof removed. A one-story home had its roof torn off and sustained collapse of its front exterior wall, and other homes and structures in town sustained roof and facade damage. Numerous trees were snapped or uprooted, some of which landed on homes. Two people were injured.						
EF0	Carriere	Pearl River	MS	30.6207°N 89.6539°W	16:30–16:31	0.19 mi (0.31 km)	25 yd (23 m)
EF0	A piece of a gas station awning in town was ripped off and thrown, striking a vehicle. Several tree limbs were broken, and a bank building had an awning ripped off and flung into nearby treetops.						
EF0	Long Beach	Harrison	MS	30.3436°N 89.1427°W	19:09–19:10	0.61 mi (0.98 km)	75 yd (69 m)
EF0	A small multiple-vortex tornado began over the Gulf of Mexico as a waterspout before moving ashore at Long Beach. A shed had its roof blown off and two tall-masted sail boats were toppled over at a harbor.						
EF1	NW of Vancleave	Jackson	MS	30.65°N 88.76°W	23:18–23:28	1.91 mi (3.07 km)	50 yd (46 m)
EF1	Trees were snapped and a shed was destroyed.						
EF1	St. Martin	Jackson	MS	30.4419°N 88.8597°W	23:19–23:22	1.36 mi (2.19 km)	75 yd (69 m)
EF1	A shopping center sustained considerable roof, window, and exterior wall damage. Vehicles were flipped and piled atop each other in the parking lot, while a restaurant and power lines sustained damage as well.						
EF1	NNW of Wade	Jackson	MS	30.68°N 88.58°W	23:39–23:40	0.27 mi (0.43 km)	25 yd (23 m)
EF1	Several trees were snapped.						

=== April 15 event ===
List of confirmed tornadoes – Sunday, April 15, 2018
EF#	Location	County / Parish	State	Start Coord.	Time (UTC)	Path length	Max width
EF0	NW of Mexico Beach	Bay	FL	30.0087°N 85.5206°W	11:09–11:13	1.13 mi (1.82 km)	60 yd (55 m)
EF0	A brief tornado touched down on the eastern portion of Tyndall Air Force Base, damaging pine trees and utility lines.						
EF1	Eastern Ausmac	Decatur	GA	30.9838°N 84.6355°W	12:55–12:56	0.46 mi (0.74 km)	31 yd (28 m)
EF1	A brief tornado snapped multiple trees in the eastern part of Ausmac.						
EF2	E of Gilbert	Lexington	SC	33.9101°N 81.3645°W	18:03–18:07	2.98 mi (4.80 km)	200 yd (180 m)
EF2	Numerous large trees were snapped, twisted, or uprooted, and power poles were snapped. Vehicles, two campers, and a group of seven chicken houses were severely damaged.						
EF0	Northeastern Lexington	Lexington	SC	34.011°N 81.2106°W	18:15–18:16	0.43 mi (0.69 km)	100 yd (91 m)
EF0	This brief tornado touched down in a residential area of Lexington. Numerous trees were snapped and uprooted, some of which fell on homes and vehicles.						
EF1	Southern Irmo	Lexington	SC	34.0364°N 81.1798°W	18:16–18:18	2.33 mi (3.75 km)	150 yd (140 m)
EF1	Numerous trees were snapped and uprooted in the southern part of Irmo, some of which fell on homes and vehicles.						
EF1	NNE of Ridgeway	Fairfield	SC	34.4152°N 80.9199°W	18:46–18:50	4.18 mi (6.73 km)	100 yd (91 m)
EF1	Numerous trees were snapped or uprooted, several of which fell on homes.						
EF0	SW of Lake Wylie	York	SC	35.0851°N 81.116°W	18:58–19:00	1.07 mi (1.72 km)	75 yd (69 m)
EF0	Several homes sustained roof, siding, and window damage. A number of trees were downed, and a plastic fence was destroyed.						
EF0	ENE of Gulfport	Pinellas	FL	27.7567°N 82.6931°W	19:12–19:13	0.2 mi (0.32 km)	20 yd (18 m)
EF0	One tree was toppled and a second was toppled, falling onto a home.						
EF1	NE of New Castle	Craig	VA	37.535°N 80.054°W	21:03–21:04	0.5 mi (0.80 km)	150 yd (140 m)
EF1	Six homes suffered extensive removal of shingles, exterior vinyl siding, and trimming. Several outbuildings and garages were severely damaged or destroyed. Three cars and a large double-axle trailer were displaced, including a truck that was flipped and landed on another vehicle. Two dogs were displaced or lofted over 100 yd (91 m) when their pens were destroyed; neither were seriously injured. Approximately 50 trees were snapped or uprooted.						
EF2	Eastern Greensboro to NNE of Ruffin	Guilford, Rockingham	NC	36.0468°N 79.7597°W	21:07–21:46	32.75 mi (52.71 km)	500 yd (460 m)
EF2	This high-end EF2 tornado first touched down on the north side of Interstate 40 in Greensboro, heavily damaging numerous homes and trees. It continued into the Hampton neighborhood, reaching peak intensity near Hampton Elementary School, where a large portion of the roof was ripped off and three nearby portable classroom buildings were blown away and completely destroyed. Major damage occurred in adjacent neighborhoods, with homes pushed off their foundations or sustaining significant roof and exterior wall loss. Power poles were snapped, while many businesses, vehicles, apartment buildings, and churches sustained severe damage as well. The tornado continued into Rockingham County, where at least 20 homes, barns, and outbuildings were significantly damaged near McLeansville, Reidsville, and in Ruffin, where an event center was also damaged, before the tornado dissipated. Countless trees were snapped or uprooted, and at least 9 people were injured along the path. There was also an indirect fatality and $67.2 million in damage.						
EF1	W of Pelham, NC to SW of Dry Fork, VA	Caswell (NC), Pittsylvania (VA)	NC, VA	36.509°N 79.510°W	21:51–22:10	16.4 mi (26.4 km)	175 yd (160 m)
EF1	In North Carolina, this rain-wrapped tornado damaged several outbuildings. The tornado continued northeast into Virginia, snapping or uprooting many trees in the western part of Danville. Several homes sustained minor roof and structural damage, power lines were downed, and several outbuildings were destroyed. A farm near the end of the path sustained the most intense damage, where a large barn was destroyed at high-end EF1 intensity.						
EF1	NW of Moneta	Bedford	VA	37.251°N 79.654°W	22:10–22:11	0.7 mi (1.1 km)	100 yd (91 m)
EF1	A home sustained significant damage to its roof, and was pushed slightly off of its cinder block foundation. A nearby barn and outbuilding also sustained extensive damage. Approximately 50 trees were snapped or uprooted.						
EF1	Coventry Township	Summit	OH	41.0131°N 81.5541°W	22:16–22:17	0.12 mi (0.19 km)	25 yd (23 m)
EF1	This small tornado was embedded in a squall line. Signs and a light pole were damaged at a Burger King, and two cars were flipped and spun around in the parking lot of a Wendy's. Several tree limbs were also snapped off of a tree.						
EF1	ESE of Rustburg	Campbell	VA	37.2478°N 79.0121°W	22:56–22:59	1.7 mi (2.7 km)	400 yd (370 m)
EF1	Several trees were snapped or uprooted, a roof was blown off a garage, and a manufactured home was pushed off its foundation. A large shed had its metal roof peeled off as well.						
EF3	Timberlake to Lynchburg to WNW of Amherst	Campbell, City of Lynchburg, Bedford, Amherst	VA	37.3264°N 79.241°W	23:00–23:25	20.4 mi (32.8 km)	600 yd (550 m)
EF3	This strong rain-wrapped tornado touched down in Timberlake, where businesses sustained heavy structural damage, cars and a semi-truck trailer were flipped, and roof damage occurred. In Lynchburg, the tornado destroyed one mobile home and damaged others at a mobile home park, damaged the roofs of several homes and businesses, and snapped or uprooted many trees The tornado briefly entered and exited Bedford County. In Amherst County, the community of Elon sustained EF3 damage, with dozens of frame homes damaged or destroyed in the area. Several of the homes were swept away with only the subflooring left behind, though these homes were very poorly anchored. A motor home was also lofted 30 ft (9.1 m) and overturned. Additional trees were snapped or uprooted before the tornado dissipated. Twelve people were injured. Damage totaled $20 million.						
EF0	WNW of Lowesville	Amherst	VA	37.724°N 79.123°W	23:38–23:41	1.5 mi (2.4 km)	75 yd (69 m)
EF0	Trees were uprooted.						
EF1	Plantation Key to Tavernier	Monroe	FL	24.9879°N 80.5511°W	01:12–01:20	1.11 mi (1.79 km)	60 yd (55 m)
EF1	A waterspout began over Florida Bay and moved ashore at Plantation Key, downing large tree limbs, ripping a driveway gate from its mounts, and pushing a boat and car. One home lost its entire gutter and downspout system, and numerous loose items such as trash cans and outside furniture were tossed. The tornado reached peak intensity as it struck a church, where large trees were uprooted and tiles were ripped from the roof. It moved back over the ocean before making a second landfall in Tavernier, where fences were damaged and tree limbs were downed.						
EF1	NNW of Wendell	Wake	NC	35.8392°N 79.4082°W	02:35–02:36	0.74 mi (1.19 km)	100 yd (91 m)
EF1	A few homes suffered damage to their shingles and siding. Numerous trees were snapped or uprooted, one of which inflicted severe damage to a home upon falling. An outbuilding was also destroyed.						

== Winter storm and blizzard ==
The larger extratropical cyclone, named Xanto by The Weather Channel, responsible for the outbreak also resulted in a record-breaking and severe winter storm and blizzard across the Midwest into the Northeastern United States, as well as neighboring Ontario and Quebec.

=== United States ===
Green Bay, Wisconsin, reported 24.2 inches (61 cm), its second-heaviest snowstorm of all time and largest ever for the month of April. In Minneapolis, Minnesota, 15.8 inches (40 cm) of snow fell, which was the largest April snowstorm on record. The storm was officially classified as a blizzard, the first to affect the Minneapolis - St. Paul metropolitan area since 2005. A baseball game where the Minnesota Twins hosted the Chicago White Sox was postponed. The storm contributed to a record-high 26 inches (66 cm) of snow for the month of April. Sioux Falls, South Dakota, received 13.7 inches (35 cm) of snow on April 14, making it the heaviest one-day April snow total on record in the city. Further east, a severe ice storm took place. 0.625 inches (1.59 cm) of freezing rain accumulated near Midland, Michigan, and up to an inch of ice was reported in Lowville, New York, in the foothills of the Tug Hill Plateau. Further east, 42nd Street–Bryant Park/Fifth Avenue station and 145th Street Station flooded, and the flash flooding in New York City also resulted in the Henry Hudson Parkway being closed down. In Edison, New Jersey, flooding forced both sides of Interstate 287 to close. Interstate 76 in Philadelphia also flooded. The 2018 Boston Marathon was held in poor conditions due to the storm.

=== Canada ===
In Ontario, a mix of snow, freezing rain, ice pellets and rain battered Toronto and the surrounding area, causing hundreds of vehicle collisions, flight cancellations, power outages and transportation delays. The CN Tower and surrounding areas in downtown Toronto were closed for several days due to falling chunks of ice after the storm. Falling ice also damaged the roof at Rogers Centre, forcing a Toronto Blue Jays game to be postponed. Watch parties for both the Toronto Maple Leafs and Toronto Raptors were cancelled. Freezing rain also caused problems in Ottawa, Montreal, and parts of New Brunswick.

== See also ==
- List of North American tornadoes and tornado outbreaks
- List of United States tornadoes in April 2018
