= Elon, Virginia =

Unincorporated community in Virginia, United States

- Unincorporated community
- Location within Virginia Location within the United States
- Coordinates: 37°31′04″N 79°11′42″W
- Country: United States
- State: Virginia
- County: Amherst
- Elevation: 843 ft (257 m)
- Time zone: UTC-5 (Eastern (EST))
  - Summer (DST): UTC-4 (EDT)
- ZIP Code: 24572 (Madison Heights); 24574 (Monroe)
- Area code: 434

Elon is an unincorporated community in Amherst County, Virginia, United States. The community is located along Virginia State Route 130, (Elon Road) northwest of Lynchburg. It is part of the Lynchburg Metropolitan Statistical Area.

== History ==
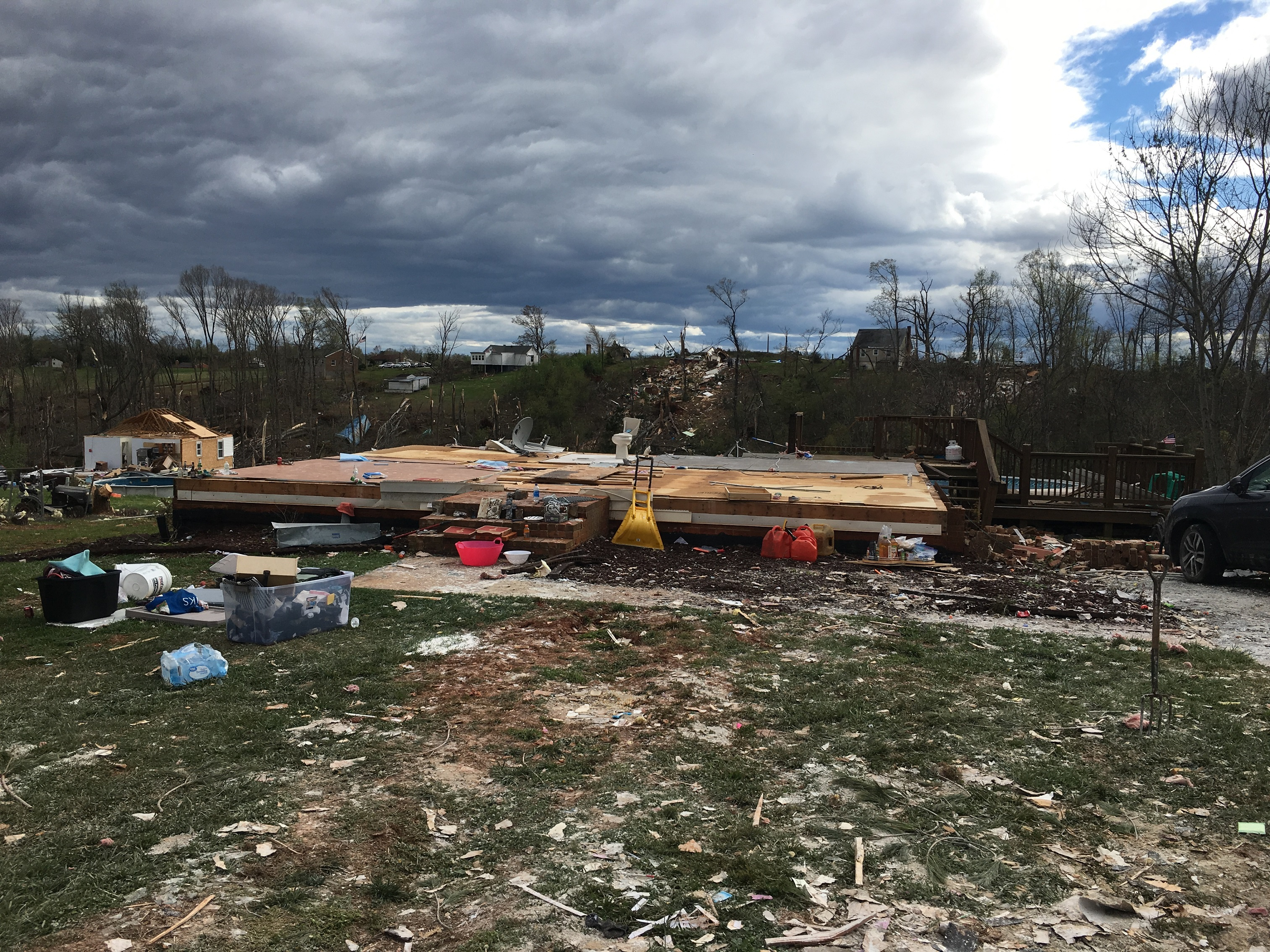
Damage from the 2018 Elon Tornado

On April 15, 2018, an EF3 tornado hit the community, destroying multiple homes.

== Education ==
The community is served by Amherst County Public Schools. Public school students residing in Elon are zoned to attend Elon Elementary School, Monelison Middle School, and Amherst County High School.

The closest higher education institutions to the community include Sweet Briar College as well as several colleges and universities in Lynchburg.

== Infrastructure ==
Law enforcement is provided by the Amherst County Sheriff's Office. Fire protection is provided by the Monelison Volunteer Fire Department, which maintains a fire station within the community. Emergency medical services are provided by the Monelison Volunteer Rescue Squad and Amherst County Department of Public Safety.

The Amherst County Service Authority maintains a public water system within the community.

== Transportation ==
=== Air ===
The Lynchburg Regional Airport is the closest airport with commercial service to the community.

=== Highways ===
- Virginia State Route 130

=== Rail ===
The closest passenger rail service is located in Lynchburg.
