= Fifth Street Historic District =

Historic district in Virginia, United States

- U.S. National Register of Historic Places
- U.S. Historic district
- Virginia Landmarks Register
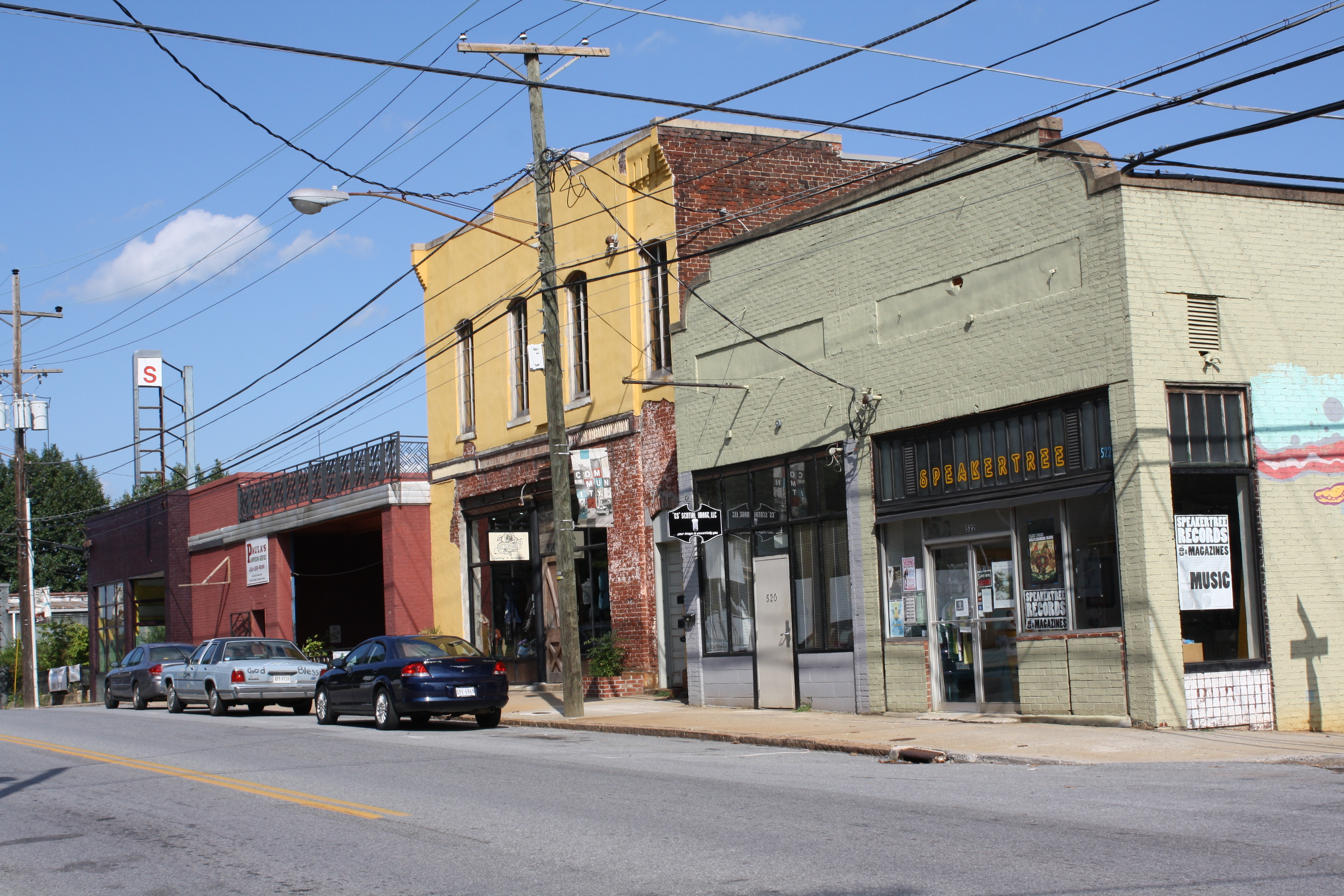
- 600 Block Fifth Street, August 2011

- Location within Virginia Location within the United States
- Location: 5th, 6th, Court, Clay, Madison, Harrison, Federal, Jackson, Polk, & Monroe Sts., Lynchburg, Virginia
- Coordinates: 37°24′54″N 79°08′59″W
- Area: 23 acres (9.3 ha)
- Built: 1806
- Architect: Johnson, Stanhope S.
- NRHP reference No.: 12000019
- VLR No.: 118-5318

Significant dates
- Added to NRHP: February 8, 2012
- Designated VLR: December 15, 2011

Fifth Street Historic District is a national historic district located at Lynchburg, Virginia. The district encompasses 57 contributing buildings and 1 contributing object in a historically African-American section of Lynchburg. It includes a variety of residential, commercial, and institutional buildings, with about half dating to the period spanning from 1875 to 1940. Located in the district are the separately listed Kentucky Hotel, the Western Hotel, the William Phaup House, and the Pyramid Motors building. Other notable buildings include the Augustine Leftwich House (c. 1817), tobacco factories (1877-1885), the Humbles Building (1915), M.R. Scott Meat Market (1919), Miller Tire and Battery Company (1927), Adams Motor Company building (1927), Hoskins Pontiac (1951), Burnett Tire Company (1956), Moser Furniture Company building (1936), Fifth Street Baptist Church (1929), Community Funeral Home (1922), and Tal-Fred Apartments (1940).

It was listed in the National Register of Historic Places in 2012.

== Narrative Description ==
=== Geographic & Topographic Description ===
The Fifth Street Historic District is located within the urban core of Lynchburg, Virginia and adjoins the City's downtown commercial district, which lies to the north and east. The district runs 2,500 feet along eight blocks of the Fifth Street corridor. In total, Fifth Street stretches approximately one mile (fifteen blocks) along a southwest-to-northeast axis between the John Lynch Bridge (crossing the James River) to the northeast and the Dr. Martin Luther King, Jr. Bridge to the southwest, which spans a valley containing the Norfolk Southern Railroad main line.

Fifth Street is currently designated as State Route 163, although it served as U.S. Route 170 from 1926 to 1931. From 1931 until 2005, Fifth Street was part of U.S. 29, which connects Maryland to Florida. In October 2005, a new bypass that circumnavigated the eastern edge of Lynchburg and Madison Heights (Amherst County) was completed and Fifth Street (the U.S. 29 Business) was re-designated as State Route 163. As Fifth Street crosses the Dr. Martin Luther King, Jr. Memorial Bridge to the southwest, the name of the street changes to Memorial Avenue. On the northeast, the name of the route changes to South Amherst Highway as it crosses the John Lynch Bridge and enters Amherst County. Fifth Street and Memorial Avenue have been given the honorary designation as Martin Luther King, Jr. Boulevard.

The primary cross street within the district is Federal Street, which intersects Fifth Street at its 700–800 block transition. Like all streets crossing Fifth (except Park Avenue), Federal Street intersects at a right angle, and runs in a southeast-to-northwest direction. On its southeastern end, Federal Street terminates in its 1100 block due to a steep cliff that overlooks Twelfth Street. On its northwestern end, Federal Street transitions into Hollins Mill Road, a winding route that crosses Blackwater Creek and terminates at its intersection with Bedford Avenue. The intersection of Fifth and Federal is marked by a single-lane, four-way roundabout and adjoining pedestrian plazas, which were completed in 2010.

At Fifth Street's transition between the 1000 and 1100 blocks, it intersects with Monroe Street as well as Park Avenue. Park Avenue departs Fifth Street at a 90-degree angle, and runs due south as it climbs College Hill before turning southwest toward the Kemper Street train station, which is served by four daily Amtrak trains.

Just northeast of the Fifth Street Historic District is the intersection of Fifth Street, Church Street (one-way southeast-bound) and Main Street (one-way northwest-bound). Just northwest of Fifth Street, Main and Church converge and form Rivermont Avenue at the Rivermont Bridge, which spans a deep gorge formed by Blackwater Creek.

Other streets (all neighborhood-serving) that intersect Fifth Street in the district are Court, Clay, Madison, Harrison, Jackson, and Polk Streets.

An unnamed tributary of Blackwater Creek drains the Tinbridge Hill neighborhood to the northwest, and the headwaters of Horseford Creek (now underground in pipes) runs in a southeasterly direction from the east side of the district, and eventually enters the James River via a culvert at the bottom of Washington Street.

The district's topography is largely flat, particularly between the 600 and 900 blocks of the route. Northeast of the 600 block, Fifth Street begins a precipitous 12 percent grade that carries the roadway downward towards the James River. The highest elevation within the district along Fifth Street is 765 feet above sea level in the 1100 block, and its lowest elevation is 710 feet above sea level in the 700 block.

=== Early Development ===
==== Lynch's Ferry and the Ferry Road ====
Seven years after Charles Lynch's 1750 patent of 1,590 acres on both sides of the Fluvanna (James) River in what was then Albemarle County, his son Edward was granted permission to establish a ferry across the river at its confluence with Blackwater Creek. Edward's brother John, then seventeen years of age, is credited with operating the ferry from the beginning. Following the ferry's establishment, John Lynch constructed a tavern known as the "Ferry House" at the base of what would become known as Ninth Street. in order to accommodate travelers who might need to halt at the south side of the river to wait for the appropriate time of day or weather conditions to utilize the ferry. Prior to the development of the ferry, the river was crossed via a ford (the "Horse Ford") at the head of what is now known as Percival's Island, which, of course, was reached by roads from the north and south. In 1781, Thomas Jefferson noted that recently mined lead and other goods could be brought from the southwest along this "good road… [which led] through the peaks of Otter to Lynch's ferry, or Winston's, on James river [sic]." As it neared Lynch's Ferry on the south side of the river, this road established the path that would become the Fifth Street corridor. The "Ferry Road" was later described as a "well-shaded road [that] led from the ferry, …coming up Seventh Street to Main, passing through the square [block] between Seventh and Sixth to Church, …and obliquely thence into what is now Fifth Street, on its way to New London."

==== Establishment of Lynchburg ====
In 1786, the General Assembly adopted an act to establish a town called "Lynchburg" on the land of John Lynch. Initially containing 45 acres, it would be divided into two-acre blocks, each with four half-acre lots with 165' frontages on the 60' wide streets (the roads that paralleled the James River) and 132' frontages on the 30' wide alleys (those roads that ran perpendicular to the river). In its beginning, there were only four alleys in the town, the westernmost one being designated as "Third Alley" (now Seventh Street).

By 1796, Lynchburg contained approximately one hundred houses and was "rapidly increasing, from its advantageous situation for carrying on trade with the adjacent country" according to Isaac Weld's travelogue. In 1805, Lynchburg was officially incorporated, and the town was expanded to the northwest and southeast, although this expansion simply made formal what John Lynch had already accomplished three years earlier; in 1802, he sold thirty half-acre lots in this soon-to-be-annexed area, which meant that the formal plan of the annexed area was already in place by the time of its expansion in 1805. Seventh Alley (later known as Fifth Street) and Sixth Alley (later known as Twelfth Street) became the primary routes of access into the town.

==== Early 19th Century Expansion ====
In March 1806, John and Mary Lynch gave the Town of Lynchburg a one acre lot "on a hill on the west side of the Main Road leading from the upper side of Lynchburg toward New London" for use as a public burying ground. The "Main Road" that Lynch described was a combination of Fifth Street (then designated as Seventh Alley) and what is now known as Park Avenue. The burying ground, now known as the Old City Cemetery, was sited on the outskirts of town, but not so distant as to be inconvenient to residents. With Lynchburg's primary business district along Second Street (now Main) at its north end, and the town's public cemetery at its south end, what is now recognized as the Fifth Street Corridor was in place by 1806. By this time, Fifth Street also became known alternately as Cocke Street or West Street. The name "Cocke" likely originated with merchant Thomas W. Cocke, who owned property along the route in the late 18th and early 19th centuries.

During the following two decades, the corporate limits of Lynchburg would expand several times, increasing the number of lots along the Fifth Street corridor that were included in the town. In 1814, the town limits were expanded to Seventh Street (now known as Harrison Street). Following the 1826 annexation, the majority of the Fifth Street corridor was within the town limits.

As the town expanded, the established design of lots, streets, and alleys also expanded. Typically, the half-acre lots were already in private hands (i.e. sold by John Lynch to other individuals) by the time they were incorporated into the town, and the future streets and alleys were accounted for in the deed. An 1805 deed between John Lynch and Peter Detto for a half acre lot at the corner of Fourth Street (now Court) and Seventh Alley (now Fifth) ordered Detto to reserve a thirty-foot alley, while an 1812 deed between Lynch and his niece Agatha Terrell Dicks described the lot as being located at the corner of the "contemplated Seventh [Harrison] Street and Third Alley [Seventh Street]."

As in many Virginia towns of the period, Lynchburg residents were required to construct on each lot a "dwelling house sixteen feet square at least, with a brick or stone chimney." Unlike other towns, however, Lynchburgers were not directed to construct their homes of any particular material, and thus, many chose wood, which was the least expensive and most readily available material. Frame dwellings were typical in Virginia, much to the consternation of Thomas Jefferson, who noted that it was "impossible to devise things more ugly, uncomfortable, and happily more perishable."

While the majority of the first dwellings constructed in Lynchburg were frame, most are no longer extant, which seems to correlate to Jefferson's comment concerning the perishability of frame buildings in Virginia. By the second decade of the 19th century, Lynchburg was experiencing its first building boom, and many of the city's buildings began to be constructed of brick.

=== Federal Period Taverns, Stores & Houses ===
==== Kentucky Hotel ====
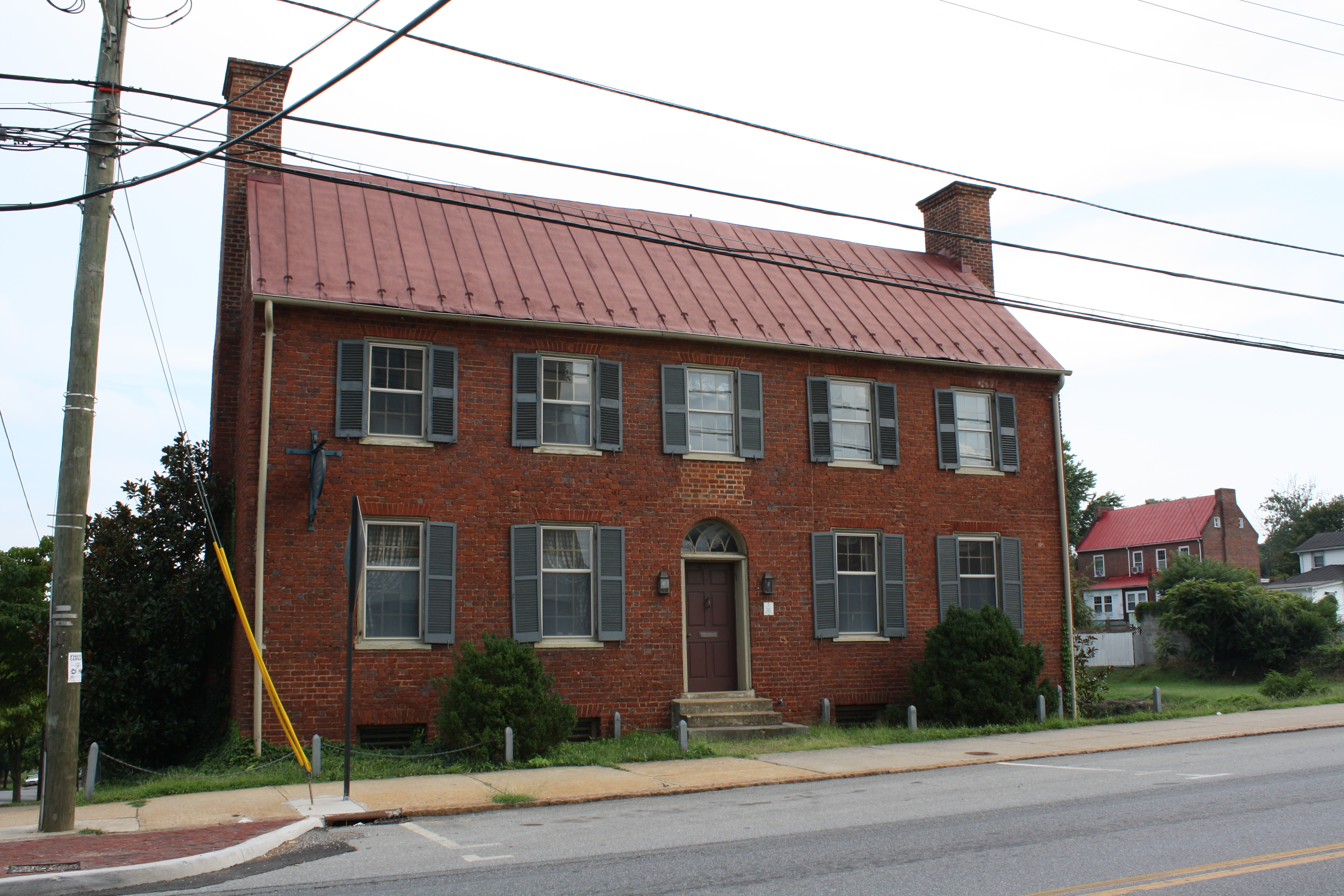
Kentucky Hotel

Two of Lynchburg's three extant taverns from the early nineteenth century are located in the Fifth Street Historic District. The left-hand three-bay section of the Kentucky Hotel (118-0177) at 900 Fifth Street may have been built as early as 1800, while the two right-hand bays were added circa 1814. Typical for Lynchburg residential architecture of the period, the Kentucky Hotel presents a five-bay façade built of brick laid in Flemish bond. The façade is fenestrated by 6/9 double-hung sash on the first floor and 6/6 double-hung sash on the second floor. A single-leaf entry door topped by a graceful fanlight is located in the central bay of the first floor, and the single-pile, side-gable building is flanked by a pair of single-shouldered corbeled chimneys (the corbeling is a recent addition or reconstruction). While the majority of Lynchburg's buildings of this period feature a wooden box cornice, the Kentucky Hotel (along with other Fifth Street buildings) has a cornice of corbeled brick.

==== Western Hotel/Nichols' Tavern ====
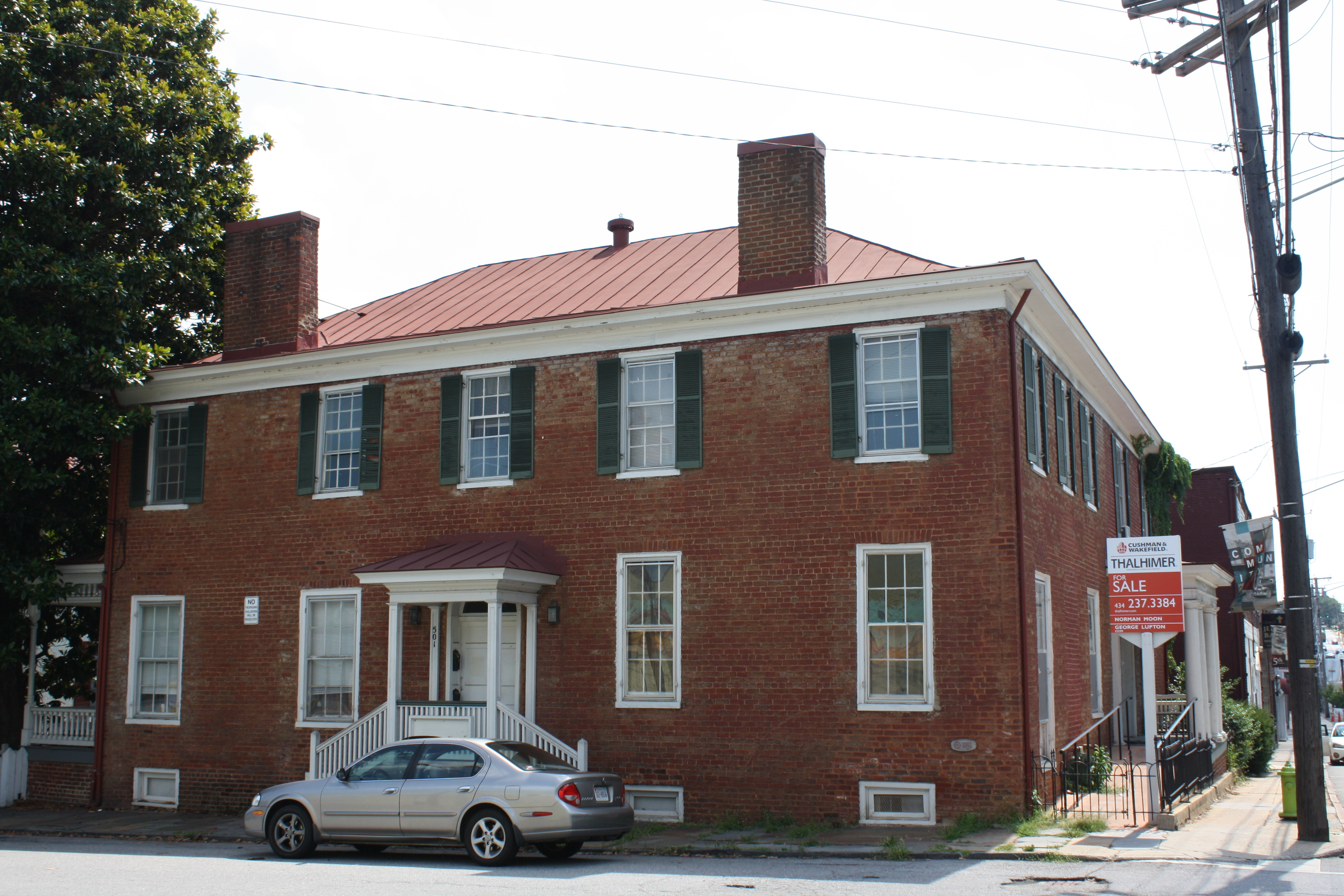
Nichols Tavern/Western Hotel

The second tavern along the corridor is known alternately as Nichols' Tavern or the Western Hotel (118-0020) and is sited at 600 Fifth Street. Built in 1815, the tavern is a replacement of Nichols' previous building that burned on April 14, 1815. The building's orientation toward the street is somewhat complex, as it may have begun its life with its asymmetrical five-bay elevation along Madison Street serving as the primary entrance. This elevation is now fenestrated by large-paned 6/6 double-hung sash on the first floor (these likely began as 9/9 sash) and 6/9 double-hung sash on the second floor. A double-leaf entry door with a fanlight similar to that found at the Kentucky Hotel occupies the central bay on the first floor, and is sheltered by a small, hipped-roof porch, which is a late 20th-century addition. However, this section of the building also would have presented a much denser three-bay façade along Fifth Street. This elevation is also fenestrated by large-paned 6/6 sash on the first floor and 6/9 double-hung sash on the second floor. The left-hand window on the first floor rests above a wooden panel, and may have once served as a doorway. Another apparent doorway in the central bay has been bricked-in. In all likelihood, the original section of the tavern had entrances on both street elevations in order to best accommodate the traveling public. This original section of the building is constructed of brick laid in four-course American bond and is covered by a hipped roof of standing-seam metal. The building was expanded in the 1830s or 1840s, and the remainder of the Fifth Street elevation took shape at that time with the addition of two bays to the south along with a columned portico.

==== Other Commercial Buildings ====
Two smaller resources from the early nineteenth century are also found along the 600 and 700 blocks of Fifth Street. The frame building at 708 Fifth Street (118-5318-0027) was likely built by prominent Lynchburg merchant Archibald Robertson (1783-1835) circa 1820. Perhaps the only intact example of frame commercial architecture from the period remaining in Lynchburg, the building presents a tight, three-bay façade along Fifth Street (while most of the façade is currently covered by T-111 siding and a later brick storefront, interior investigation reveals the building's true nature). The two-story, double-pile (the rear chimney has been removed below the roofline) building is of timber frame construction, and is covered by a side gable roof of standing-seam metal with a simple boxed cornice. While the first floor storefront has been remodeled by the addition of a brick façade and aluminum and glass commercial door, the second floor (underneath the T-111 siding) retains its original fenestration with a single-leaf doorway with a four-pane transom, which once opened onto an overhanging balcony, flanked by a pair of 6/6 double-hung sash.

The building's balcony was likely in place through the first quarter of the 20th century, and is a reminder of a once-common architectural feature on Fifth Street that has completely disappeared from the district. The 1895 Sanborn Insurance Company map of the area shows that at least 13 buildings along the 600 and 700 blocks of Fifth Street had some sort of balcony, porch, or awning that overhung Fifth Street. This scene may have been captured by German-born artist Bernhard Gutmann (1869-1936), who, in 1895, sketched what he called "Negro Street" in Lynchburg. This image shows more than half a dozen two- or two-and–a-half-story buildings with steeply pitched side-gable roofs, end chimneys, narrow two- and three-bay facades, and shallow two-story covered porches. While not definitively a sketch of Fifth Street, it is highly likely that Gutmann was depicting a streetscape along the 600 or 700 block of the corridor.

The two-and-a-half-story building at 612 Fifth Street (118-5318-0018) is another rare surviving example of early 19th century residential or commercial architecture (during this period, there is little stylistic distinction between buildings for residential use versus commercial use) in Lynchburg. While not the first building to stand on the site, the present building was likely built in 1827 by Lilbourn Johnson. A three-bay, double pile building (the rear interior end chimney has been removed), 612 Fifth Street is of brick construction with kneelered (parapeted) gables capped by half-round brick coping, a feature rarely found in Lynchburg. While the façade has been covered by a modern layer of running bond brick, the building's early 19th century roots can be clearly discerned.

==== Houses of the Federal Period ====
Lastly, a cluster of Federal period dwellings is located just off of the main thoroughfare near Sixth Street's intersections with Federal, Jackson, and Polk Streets. Perhaps the largest extant frame house of the period in Lynchburg, the c. 1817 Augustine Leftwich House (118-5318-0062) is a five-bay, double-pile L-shaped dwelling covered by a hipped roof with dormers. Altered over time, the façade is fenestrated by 2/2 double-hung sash, and a second floor doorway opens onto a balcony created by a three-bay porch that shelters the entry door on the first floor. The house retains what appears to be an original outbuilding that is covered by a hipped roof with a dentiled cornice. The house at 523 Jackson Street (118-5318-0037) is a now-rare Lynchburg example of a three-bay frame house of the Federal period. Probably built by James Mallory (owner of the nearby Kentucky Hotel) in 1814, the house is one of five remaining three-bay frame houses dating to the second decade of the 19th century in Lynchburg (the other four may be found nearby, but outside of the Fifth Street district, in the 1000 and 1100 blocks of Jackson Street, 1100 block of Polk Street, and on Lucado Place). The two-story, side-hall plan house rests on a high stone English basement, and features an original shed-roofed, one-story back porch of a type known to locals of the period as a "shelving porch."

Directly across the street at 522 Jackson (118-5318-0036) is a somewhat unusual four-bay, 2 1/2-story house. Constructed in 1817, the brick building is laid in three-course American bond, which is not often found as a bond on primary elevations of Lynchburg houses (the nearby c. 1813 Dicks-Elliott House [118-5063] also features this bond throughout), and is atypically fenestrated by 6/6 double-hung sash on the first floor with 9/9 double-hung sash on the second floor. Nearby at 911 Sixth Street is a mirror image of the house at 522 Jackson. Also constructed in 1817, the William Phaup House (118-0226-0246) also displays a four-bay façade, but the entry door is located in the left center bay instead of the right center bay. The brick dwelling is laid in Flemish bond on the façade, with variable three and four-course American bond on the gable ends. Like 522 Jackson, the Phaup House exhibits the stylistic faux-pas (in Adamesque terms) of not diminishing the size of the windows on upper floors. The facade is fenestrated by 6/9 double-hung sash on both the first and second levels, and as late as the 1980s, contained a second floor entry door as well (now replaced by a window) and a small two-story porch (this may not have been an original feature).

Rounding out the Fifth Street Historic District's collection of early buildings is the two-and-a-half-story brick house at 514 Polk Street (118-5318-0046), which, like 911 Sixth Street, was likely built as a speculative investment by William Phaup as early as 1817. However, this is where the similarities between the two Phaup houses end. The house at 514 Polk Street began as a two-bay building, and the right bay was added soon after to create the present widely spaced three-bay façade, which is laid in Flemish bond. As a cost-saving measure, secondary elevations are laid in five-course American bond. Like the building at 612 Fifth Street, this house features a kneelered (parapeted) gable roof. The left (original) kneeler is capped by coping of half-round bricks, while the right kneeler is flat. Windows on the first floor are 9/1 double-hung sash, and are 6/1 double-hung sash on the second floor.

=== Mid 19th Century Tobacco Factories ===
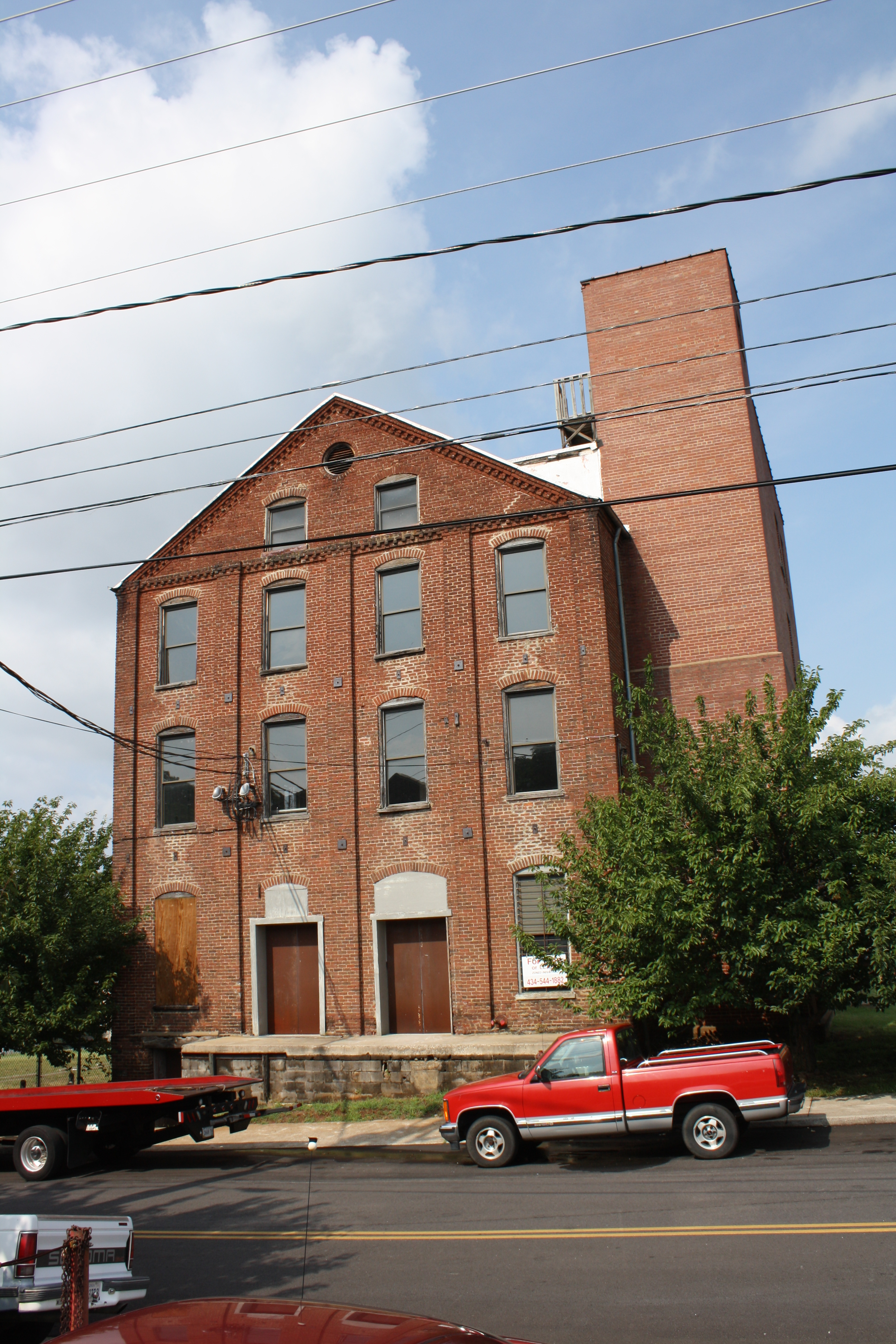
Gist Tobacco Factory

The next significant cluster of buildings in the district can be found in the 400 block of Court Street, and are representative of the tobacco factories that were ubiquitous in Lynchburg throughout the 19th century. Both constructed between 1877 and 1885, the tobacco factories at 409 Court Street (118-5318-0001) and 410 Court Street (118-0075) are the largest contributing buildings within the Fifth Street Historic District. The gable front of the two-and-a-half-story building at 409 Court Street is built of oiled brick laid in running bond, while the sides of the factory are laid with a more rustic brick in the five-course American bond pattern. The building at 410 Court Street, which also presents its gable end on Court Street as the primary elevation, is a three-and-a-half-story building that rests on a high basement. The entire factory is built of brick, and the original portion is largely five-course American bond. On both buildings, virtually all ornamentation is reserved for the upper portions of the gable ends that front onto Court Street.

=== Early 20th Century Commercial Buildings ===
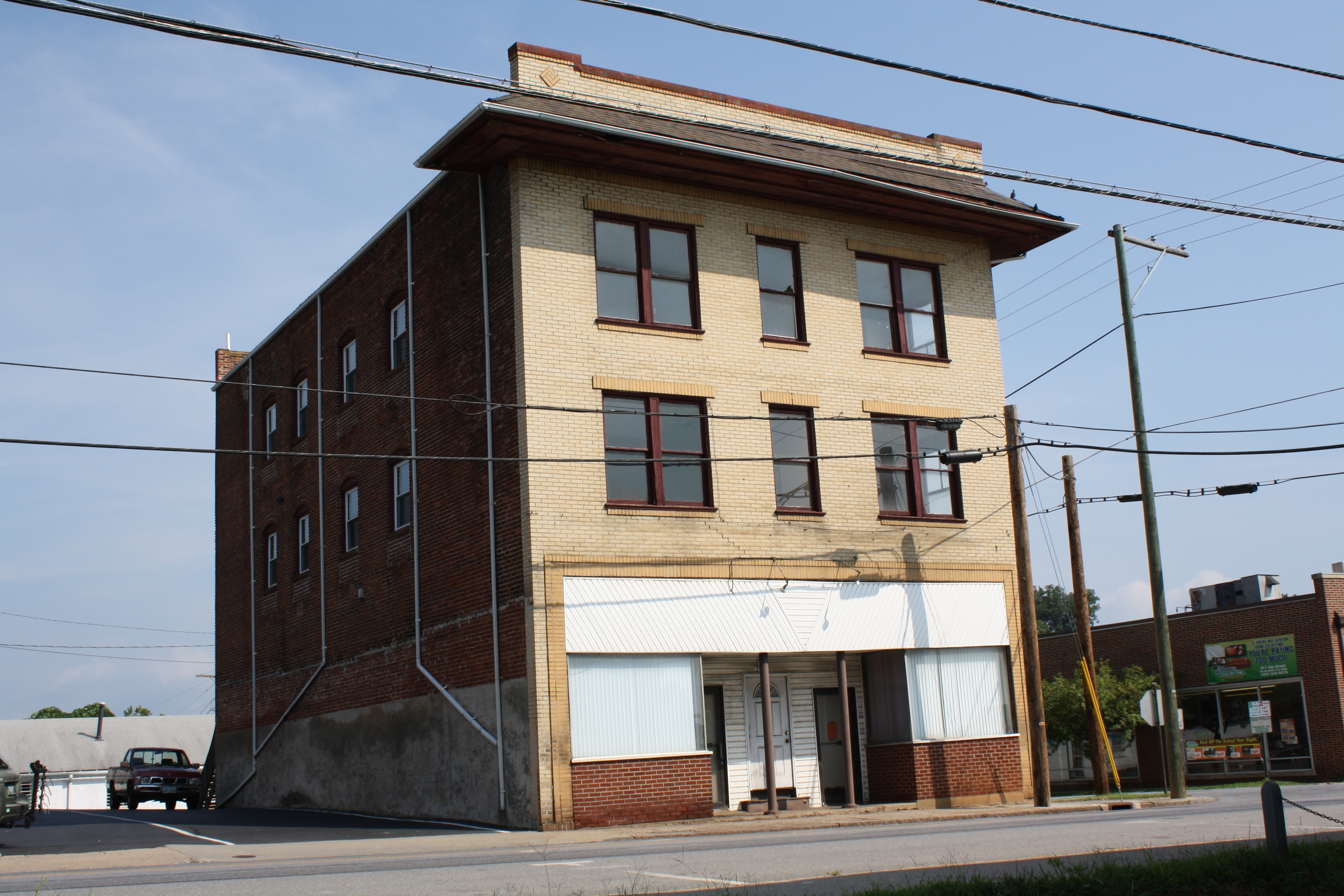
Humbles Building

Around 1900, many frame buildings along Fifth Street, both residential and commercial, began to be replaced with more substantial brick commercial buildings. Constructed in 1906, the one-story building at 500 Fifth Street (118-5318-0007) featured two storefronts, each framed by vertical brick quoining and horizontal brick panels. One of the first two-story brick commercial buildings to be constructed along Fifth Street during this period, the right-hand section of 701-703 Fifth Street (118-5318-0024) was in place by 1907. The three-bay, two-part commercial block building has a storefront that wraps around the corner onto Harrison Street, and is topped by a corbeled brick cornice with a moulded tin cap. The left-hand portion (numbered 703 Fifth Street), also a three-bay building, was added soon after 1907, and mimics the design of its mate. Also a two-story, two-part commercial block building, 606 Fifth Street (118-5318-0016) consists of two halves, each of which are three bays wide. The building's brickwork is somewhat unusual for the area, as the six-course American bond is separated by rowlock, rather than header, brick.

Built in 1915, the Humbles Building at 901 Fifth Street (118-5318-0039) is an impressive three-story, two-part commercial block edifice faced with yellow brick laid in a running bond on the Fifth and Jackson Street elevations. The upper windows are capped by a row of soldier bricks, and the storefront area is framed by a series of soldier and rowlock bricks. The M.R. Scott Meat Market (118-5318-0023) at 700 Fifth Street is one of the most architecturally refined buildings along Fifth Street. Designed by Lynchburg architects Samuel Preston Craighill and Bennett Cardwell in 1919, the one-story building features the name "M.R. Scott" engraved on a panel of Vermont white marble, and squares of "antique verde marble" accent the area above the storefront. The storefront is dominated by brick pilasters with cement caps, and a recessed panel of basket-woven brick spans the top of the façade. The three-story, three-bay, two-part commercial block building at 709 Fifth Street (118-5318-0028) features brick quoining on the upper two stories, which are visually separated by a series of three stuccoed diamond panels. The windows on the upper two levels of the circa 1936 building are capped by brick splayed jackarches with cement keystones.

=== Automobile-oriented Buildings ===
One of the first automobile-oriented buildings in the district was built in 1927 for the Miller Tire and Battery Company (118-5317) at 400 Fifth Street. The original portion (first floor) of the building is constructed of hard-fired rusticated brick. The most unusual feature of the building was a diagonal porte-cochere on its north corner that allowed drivers to stop at the building, visit the business office, and perhaps check their tire pressure without being exposed to the elements. This pass-through was supported on its extreme northern corner by a single brick pillar. In the 1940s, the porte-cochere was infilled, and a second story was added to the building.

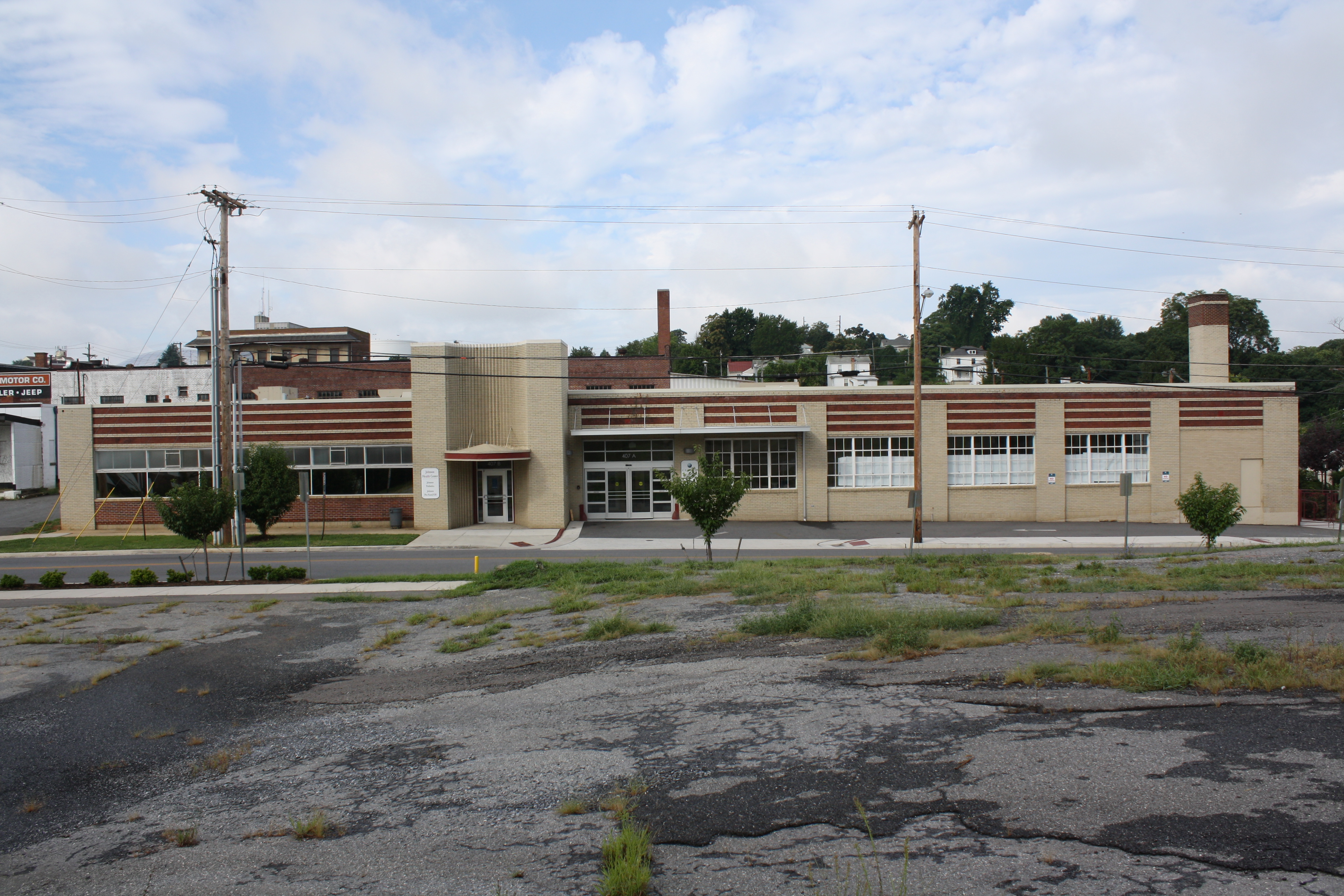
Pyramid Motors

The Adams Motor Company building at 811 Fifth Street (118-5318-0034) was also built in 1927 and spans half of the block; it has one of the largest footprints of any building in the district. Originally constructed to house showrooms for three separate car retailers, the Flemish bond brick façade is divided into three sections, each containing three large storefront windows (except for the central bay of the right-hand section, which contains a garage door). The façade is dominated by large arched glazed fanlights with tracery (now covered with a dryvit-like material), which top each of the nine windows or garage doors. The district's second mammoth automobile showroom, Pyramid Motors (118-5237), was built in 1937 and is located at 407 Federal Street. The one-story Art Deco-style building features a yellow brick façade with contrasting red brick details. A semi-circular entry tower of corbelled yellow brick dominates the center of the façade and rises above the building's flat roof.

The district also features two smaller, later automobile or auto parts retail buildings. Built in 1951 for Hoskins Pontiac, the building at 1018 Fifth Street (118-5318-0050) features a polygonal façade that is dominated by an angular metal canopy, yellow brick laid in a running bond, and polished aluminum doorframes. A service area along the Polk Street elevation is fenestrated by a short row of steel hopper windows topped by large vertical panels of thick green corrugated glass. The Burnett Tire Company building at 403 Fifth Street (118-5318-0004) was likely designed by the Lynchburg architectural firm of Cress & Johnson (Carl Cress and Stanhope S. Johnson) in 1956, and features a striking angular glass storefront that conveys a modern sense of upward movement and speed.

Several early to mid-20th century service stations are also located along Fifth Street, the most notable being the eclectic Spanish Revival-style filling station at 1100 Fifth Street (118-5318-0051) at Fifth Street's key intersection with Monroe Street and Park Avenue. Built in 1927, the building follows the box-and-canopy form. Identical to the station at 1201 Rivermont Avenue (118-0334-0112), the building features a gable-front porte-cochere covered with green terra cotta tiles. A pair of globe light fixtures tops the porte-cochere's two end supporting columns.

=== Other notable buildings ===
==== Moser Furniture Company ====
A departure from other commercial buildings in the district, the Moser Furniture Company building at 409 Fifth Street (118-5318-0005) appears more domestic than commercial. The 1 1/2-story, single-pile Colonial Revival style building was built in 1936. A scaled-down version of a previous concept, the current building was designed in 1933 by Stanhope S. Johnson and R.O. Brannan. Displaying all of the elements of a "proper" building of the style and period, the brick store is laid in Flemish bond, features a steeply pitched side gable roof covered with Buckingham slate with three dormers and a modillioned cornice, and two corbeled interior end chimneys flank the main building. A pair of smaller wings is set back from the primary plane of the façade, and a pair of large bay windows flanks the single-leaf entry door, which is surrounded by a pedimented frontispiece. A long, two-story warehouse and furniture factory constructed of concrete masonry units projects from the rear of the main building.

==== Fifth Street Baptist Church ====
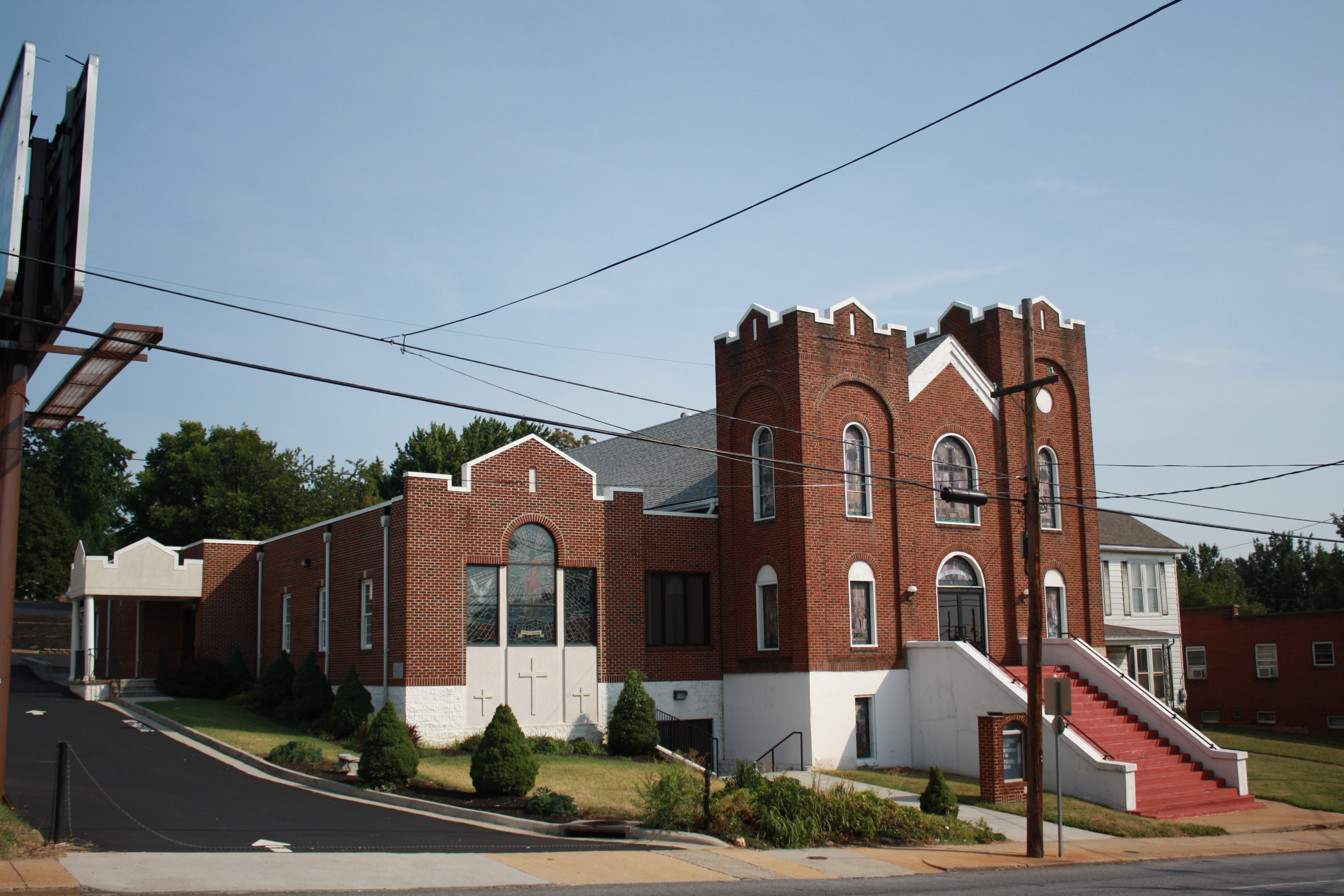
Fifth Street Baptist Church

The only example of ecclesiastical architecture in the district is the Fifth Street Baptist Church at 1007-1013 Fifth Street (118-5318-0053). Built in 1929 to replace an earlier building, the church displays elements of the Gothic Revival style. The building's gable end fronts Fifth Street, and is anchored by a pair of staggered height crenelated towers (the taller, right-hand tower features a stuccoed round recessed panel at the top). The three-bay façade is built of brick laid in a running bond, and is fenestrated by arched stained glass windows. A later parish house addition is attached to the south side of the church, and was designed sympathetically to the architecture of the nave.

==== Community Funeral Home ====
What appears to be the district's most recent building, the Community Funeral Home at 909 Fifth Street (118-5318-0040) is actually a historic building with a modern shell. The right-hand portion of the building was constructed in 1922 as a two-story, two-part commercial block brick building with two storefronts separated by a doorway that led to a stairway to the second floor. The second floor façade contained an unusual central space that may have been a large window or perhaps a recessed balcony (period photographs do not clearly show this space due to shadows created by a cloth awning overhead). In 1976, Lynchburg architect J. Everette Fauber, Jr. created two design options for an upgrade and expansion of the building. The first option involved reconfiguring the left storefront of the building to include Gothic-style arched chapel windows, with a modern addition to the left (south) of the building. The second option, which is what was chosen, covered the entire façade of the historic building with a blank canvas of running bond brick, and joined to it a one-story addition with a striking, recessed angular entry. While obscuring the historic façade, Fauber's second design achieved its purpose of marrying the two buildings and creating a cohesive architectural statement.

==== Multi-family Residences ====
Lastly, two residential buildings from the mid-20th century are worthy of mention. Somewhat unusual for multifamily dwellings of the period and area, the duplex at 411-413 Polk Street is a one-story building constructed of brick laid in five-course American bond. Built in 1940, the duplex's spartan four-bay façade contains a pair of single-leaf entry doors in the two central bays, and each outer bay contains a 1/1 double-hung sash window. The doors and windows are capped by flat jackarches of soldier bricks, and a band of soldier bricks encircles the building at the water table. The building is covered by a flat roof that is obscured from view by a parapet wall that features shallow corbelling near the top. The large brick building at 600 Monroe Street, originally known as the Tal-Fred Apartments (118-5318-0059), rises two stories above Monroe Street, although the Sixth Street elevation contains three stories over a basement. Built circa 1940, the building apparently contained six relatively large apartment units. Covered by a hipped roof with vented dormer, the building's primary entrance features a single-leaf entry door flanked by sidelights and topped by a semi-elliptical fanlight. The doorway is sheltered by a wooden canopy suspended by chains. In 1949, architect Pendleton S. Clark designed interior and exterior modifications, which likely included a greenstone patio enclosed by a low brick wall with greenstone coping that is located between the building and Monroe Street.

== Statement of Significance ==
The Fifth Street Historic District includes approximately 23 acres of commercial district and residential clusters to the southwest of Lynchburg's central business district. The district includes more than 55 contributing resources and less than 10 non-contributing resources.

The Fifth Street Corridor began its development in the early nineteenth century as a gateway to Lynchburg, connecting the booming town with points westward as evidenced by transportation-oriented businesses of the period with names like the Kentucky Hotel (118-0177) and the Western Hotel (118-0020). During the late nineteenth century, Fifth Street (also known variably as Seventh Alley, Cocke Street, or West Street) served as the site of uses that would seem to be incompatible; it hosted high-end residential areas for Lynchburg's white population while at the same time serving as the principal scene of commerce for the area's African American community. "The Negro in Virginia," (<-- this is no longer available to view "The Negro in Virginia". Please correct link for reference.) a milestone report published by the Virginia Writers' Project of the Works Progress Administration in 1940, described Lynchburg's Fifth Street along with Roanoke's Henry Street, South Avenue in Petersburg, and Second Street in Richmond, as a place where "the 'crowd' may be found almost every evening… here is a little oasis – 'our street.' Race pride is triumphant; here one need bow and scrape to no one. Drug stores, cafes, barbershops, pool halls, grocery and clothing stores, news-stands and theaters…are operated for Negroes by Negroes." In addition to serving as the center of African American business in the twentieth century, the corridor developed as a major automobile sales and service district, serving as host to filling and service stations, tire and auto parts stores, and automobile showrooms.

The Fifth Street Historic District has a period of significance ranging from 1800 to 1964, beginning with the date of construction for the oldest standing resource in the district and concluding with the end of significant commercial expansion within the boundaries of the district. It is locally significant under Criterion A in the areas of commerce and transportation for its role in the commercial and physical development of the City of Lynchburg. The Fifth Street Historic District is also locally significant under Criterion A for its role as a center of African American commerce and culture from the late nineteenth century through the mid-twentieth century. Also locally significant under Criterion C for its important collection of domestic and commercial architecture, the district boasts examples of the Federal (and early nineteenth century Virginia vernacular), early twentieth century commercial, Art Deco, Colonial Revival, and modern styles. The district displays substantial integrity of location, material, association, design, and workmanship.

=== Architecture ===
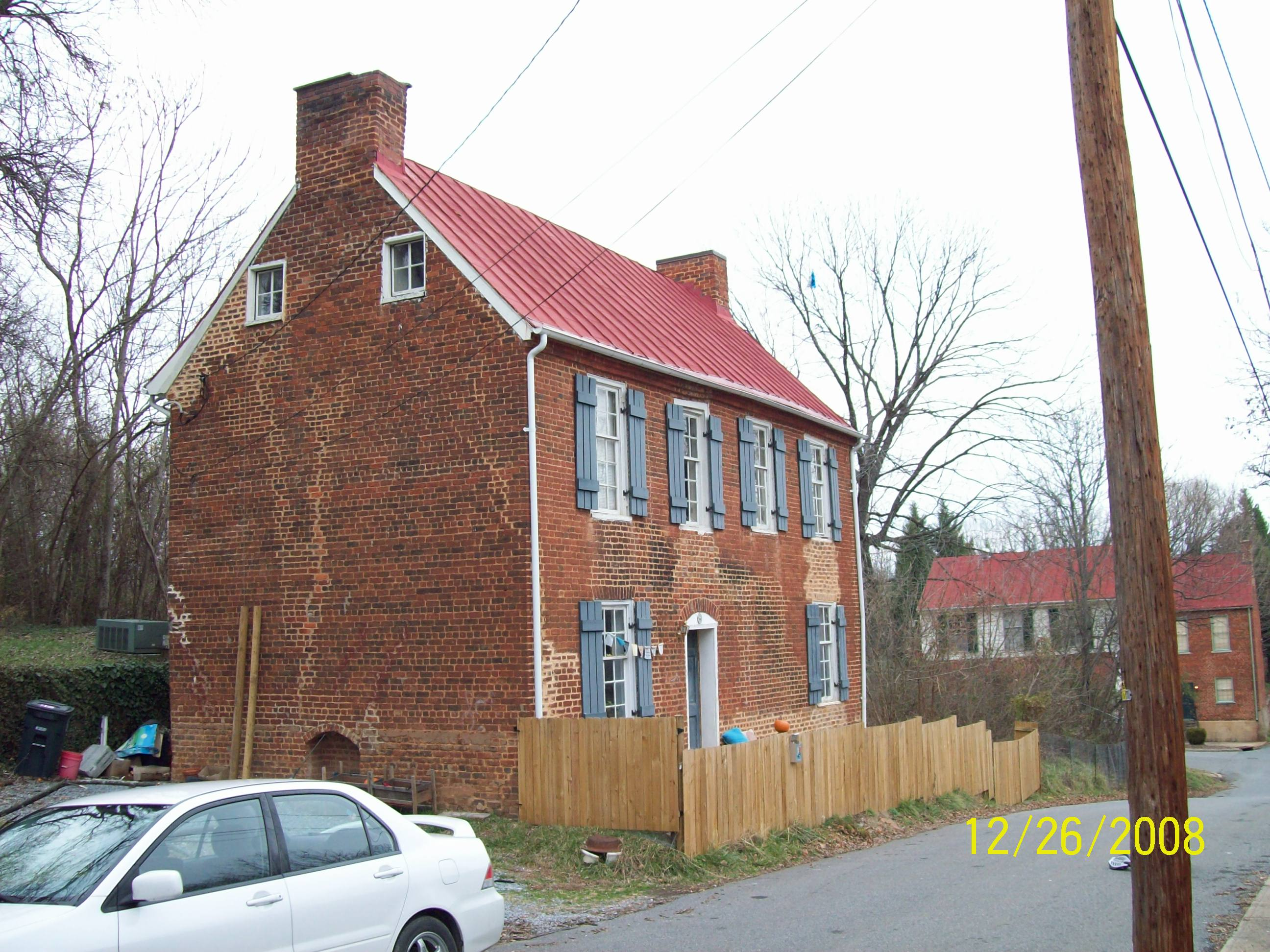
William Phaup House

The Fifth Street Historic District is Lynchburg's fourth historic district with a commercial or industrial theme, and exhibits an unprecedented diversity of architectural styles that provides evidence of the corridor's role as an important commercial center from the 19th through the 20th centuries. The district's collection of residential and commercial architecture dating to the Early National Period (1790-1829) is second (in Lynchburg) only to the Federal Hill Historic District (118-0056). Two of the city's three remaining taverns of the period, the Kentucky Hotel (118-0177) and Nichols Tavern (118-0020), are located on Fifth Street. Perhaps the last two of Lynchburg's early double-pile town houses (or stores) are located at 612 and 708 Fifth Street (118-5318-0018 and 118-5318-0027, respectively). In addition, the district boasts five additional dwellings that were constructed before 1820. These five houses, located just off of Fifth Street on Polk, Sixth, and Federal Streets, were constructed during Fifth Street's rise as a commercial and transportation center in the early 19th century, and are representative of similar known resources along the 300 and 900 blocks of Fifth Street that have been demolished. A sampling of the area's most progressive automobile-oriented architecture can also be found along Fifth Street, including the Colonial Revival style Adams Motor Company building at 811 Fifth Street (118-5318-0034), the Art Deco style Pyramid Motors Company building at 407 Federal Street (118-5237), and the modern style showrooms at 403 and 1101 Fifth (118-5318-0004 and 118-5318-0052, respectively).

=== Commercial and Transportation Corridor ===
In January 1805, the Virginia General Assembly adopted an act that incorporated the town of Lynchburg, thus allowing the mayor and common councilmen to become a "body corporate" which was authorized to erect public works and buildings. In addition, the act provided for the expansion of the original 1786 limits of the town, and new thoroughfares, including Seventh Alley (alleys ran perpendicular to the James River) were formalized. As the system of two-acre blocks, each containing four half-acre lots, spread westward, the winding old Ferry Road, which had provided access to Lynch's Ferry at least since 1757, was merged with Seventh Alley. Thus, travelers heading westward to the communities of New London, Liberty (now Bedford), Salem, and the Cumberland Gap would cross the James River via Lynch's Ferry (this ferry would be replaced by a toll bridge in 1812), proceed up Water Street (now Ninth Street), turn right on Second Street (now Main), and then left onto Seventh Alley (now Fifth Street). Seventh Alley headed up the long incline from the James River, crested what is now known as Court House Hill, and proceeded in a southwesterly direction, ultimately connecting with the New London Road (later designated as the Lynchburg & Salem Turnpike, or Fort Avenue).

Due to the volume of traffic coming from and going to the western parts of Virginia, Seventh Alley (now known as Fifth Street) was in a prime position for commercial growth. Until circa 1805, virtually all commercial activity in Lynchburg took place along what is now known as Main Street, as well as at the bottom of what is now known as Ninth Street where the ferry (and later toll bridge) crossed the James River. Between 1797 and 1805, 13 out of 14 non-residential Lynchburg properties insured by the Mutual Assurance Society of Virginia were located on Main Street. Around this time, Seventh Alley also became known as Cocke Street, probably because merchant and civic leader Thomas W. Cocke owned at least two lots along the corridor prior to 1805. Another alternate name for the route was "West Street," which may have originated from the surname of West, but more likely because the street was the route taken to proceed in a westerly direction.

Not surprisingly, the popularity of the route as a transportation corridor also led to the construction of several taverns along Fifth Street in the second decade of the 19th century, which marked Lynchburg's first building boom (which was tempered only by the financial panic of 1819). In 1814, James Mallory purchased lot number 395 (at the corner of what is now known as Jackson and Fifth Streets) from Israel Snead. The original three-bay section of the house at 900 Fifth Street (118-0177) may have been standing at this time, and Mallory likely expanded the house to its present five-bay configuration soon after he purchased the property. Mallory's tavern would soon be known as the Kentucky Hotel, an obvious reference to the ultimate destination of many Fifth Street travelers, and was the primary landmark in the area, as an 1817 appointment of road surveyors refers to the "road leading by James Mallory's (called West Street)." Jacob Feazle purchased the tavern from Mallory in 1826 and then married Ann Cobbs, owner of 514 Polk Street (118-5318-0046), in 1829. Two years later, Jacob and Ann sold the tavern to Pleasant Partin for the respectable amount of $3,100. The Kentucky Hotel was listed in the National Register of Historic Places in 1986.

Joseph Nichols' Tavern (118-0020) was built in 1815 and almost immediately burned due to sparks emanating from a blacksmith shop across Fifth Street. It was rebuilt in the same year due to an outpouring of support from the community, who raised more than $1,300 to assist Mr. Nichols and his family. Joseph Nichols was an experienced tavern keeper, as he was issued his first license in 1799, although the location of his previous tavern is unknown. Joseph and Lewis Nichols operated the tavern at 600 Fifth Street through 1822. John F. Johnson operated the business from 1824 until his death in 1843, when his widow, Mary, took over. She served as the tavern keeper until 1850, when she was listed as a resident in the household of Allen J. Black, a tavern keeper. During the Johnsons' ownership, the tavern became known as the Western Hotel. The building was listed in the National Register of Historic Places in 1974.

In 1818, William Shaw began operating a tavern at his house (already well-known as "Travelers Rest") at the southeast corner of what is now Court and Fifth Street. In particular, Shaw catered to children, as he noted that the property was convenient to three schools. Fisher's Auto Parts Warehouse (118-5317) now occupies the site of Travelers Rest. The presence of two extant taverns dating to the early 19th century is significant, as it is thought that only three taverns from the period remain in Lynchburg (the third being Major Oliver Towles' tavern [also known as Cross Keys] at 1200-1204 Main Street). In 1816, at least 16 taverns operated in the town.

Naturally, retailers began to establish themselves along Fifth Street during the same period. Peter Detto may have operated a store (or perhaps even a tavern) soon after his 1805 purchase of a lot on the southwest corner of what is now Clay and Fifth Streets. In 1818, merchant Benjamin Perkins acquired the lot at the southeast corner of Fifth and Harrison Streets and promptly sold it to Archibald Robertson, surviving partner of Brown Robertson & Co. Scottish-born merchant William Brown, who died in the Richmond Theatre Fire of 1811, had numerous mercantile connections throughout Virginia, including at Otter Bridge in Bedford County, Milton in Albemarle County, and Manchester opposite Richmond. Following Brown's death, Archibald Robertson took over a great deal of the business operation. Robertson operated several stores (including one at what is now Seventh and Main Street), and many of Lynchburg's leading citizens were his customers. Thomas Jefferson was a longstanding customer of the firm, and at the time of his death in 1826, Jefferson owed $6,000, or 6% of his total debt, to Robertson. Robertson constructed at least two buildings on the lot, and merchant Lindsay B. Padgett purchased the lot from Robertson's estate in 1844. Specializing in ready-made clothing and dry goods, Padgett operated stores on both Main Street and Cocke (Fifth Street). He owed substantial debts to many individuals and companies, and mortgaged his real and personal properties in order to secure the debts. Padgett apparently defaulted on the note, and an October 1847 Lynchburg Virginian advertisement announced the public sale of his property, including "all ready made clothing now in his store on Cocke Street." Retail grocer James M. Cochran purchased the store building, then referred to as the "Red House," at 708 Fifth Street (118-5318-0027) in 1849.

Another early store is located at 612 Fifth Street (118-5318-0018), and was probably built by Lilbourn Johnson in 1827. The previously mentioned merchant Lindsay Padgett purchased the building around 1839. Like Federal period taverns of Lynchburg, store buildings of the period are very rare in the city, and these two buildings are part of a group of less than half a dozen extant and recognizable pre-1830 commercial buildings in Lynchburg.

In his 1835 gazetteer of Virginia, Joseph Martin noted that the "Lynchburg and eastern turnpike, running S.W. through New London and Liberty, is now completed half the distance." The macadamized road "enters Lynchburg at the lower [eastern, or downriver] end of town. To accommodate the wants of the other end, an arm has been constructed from Cocke, or West Street (the northernmost alley) intersecting the turnpike a mile and a half from town." The turnpike mentioned was also known as the Lynchburg & Salem Turnpike, and entered Lynchburg by the route of current Fort Avenue, which turned into Twelfth Street. An 1825 map submitted to the General Assembly shows that "7th Alley or Cocke or West Street" turned into the "Road to Bedford," and that a road that "connects with [the] Turnpike" veered off of it well after it left the town of Lynchburg (the outer limits were marked by what is now Taylor Street). Using this map and Martin's description, it can be ascertained that the "Road to Bedford" followed what is now Fifth Street along its present course southwest of College Hill, then followed Memorial Avenue to the vicinity of the present E.C. Glass High School, where it turned to the west and followed the course of Lakeside Drive and Forest Road. The road that, in 1825, connected Fifth Street with the turnpike, followed the course of modern Memorial Avenue, and intersected the turnpike at what would later become the site of Fort Early. Fifth Street businesses likely fought for more convenient access to the Lynchburg & Salem Turnpike, as this route required two miles of travel between the edge of Lynchburg along Fifth Street before one intersected with the turnpike road. The "arm" that Martin described as accommodating the "wants of the other end" of town would have departed Fifth Street at its intersection with Monroe Street, and intersected the turnpike at the place called "Watering Branch," exactly one and a half miles from downtown. This route, followed today by a portion of Park and Fort Avenues, only required Fifth Street residents to travel one mile before they reached the turnpike. This simple roadway improvement guaranteed Fifth Street's continuance as a commercial center into the second half of the 19th century.

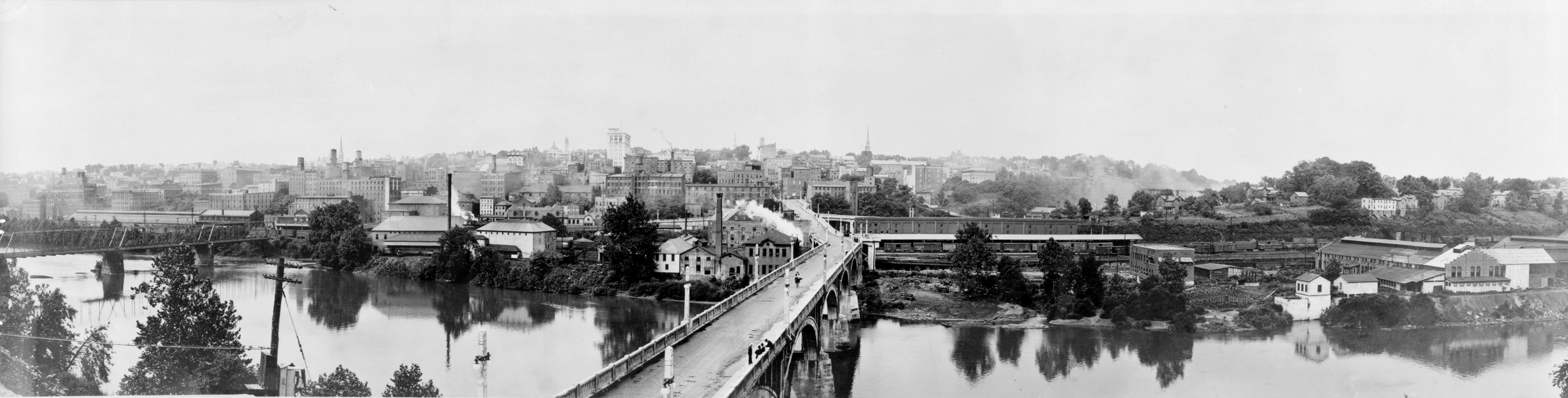
This 1919 photo of downtown Lynchburg shows the Williams Viaduct (right), which carried traffic (via a short stretch of Main Street to Seventh Street) from the Fifth Street corridor across the James River northward into Amherst County. The earlier river crossing at Ninth Street can be seen to the far left.

By the time of the Civil War, the Fifth Street corridor was home to a number of tobacco warehouses and factories. As casualties from the field began to pour into Lynchburg, which was quickly becoming a major hospital center, all large buildings in the city were appropriated for use as hospitals. By 1862, Reid's and Booker's warehouses, near the intersection of Fifth, Church, and Court Streets, comprised Division 1 of General Hospital Number 1, and Division 3 consisted of Burton's Warehouse (on the west side of Fifth between Harrison and Federal) and Candler's Warehouse, which was on the east side of Fifth near Polk. Many casualties from the hospitals throughout town were sent to what is now known as the Old City Cemetery (118-0027) at Fourth and Monroe Street for burial.

In June 1864, Fifth Street played a supporting role in the defense of the city against an attack by Federal General David Hunter. Susan Leigh Blackford recounted that "General Breckinridge, with some troops, got here on Wednesday night, and as we saw them passing out West [Fifth] Street…the streets were lined with women, waving their handkerchiefs and cheering them on as they moved out onto a line on the hills west of the city." Cadets from the Virginia Military Institute arrived on June 16, and were ordered to dig defensive lines in the area of Fifth Street as it crested College Hill. That night, the cadets slept amongst the gravestones at the Old City Cemetery. The fighting on June 17 and 18 was primarily limited to the outer defenses, and Lynchburg's inner defenses that stretched from the Old City Cemetery across Fifth Street, and along the ridge of College Hill, were not tested in battle.

After the Civil War, tobacco manufacturing continued along the Fifth Street corridor. An 1877 map of Lynchburg shows S.P. Halsey's Prizery at the south corner of Fifth and Clay Streets. The Myers factory was located between Harrison and Federal near Fourth Street, and an unnamed factory was at the north corner of Fifth and Federal. A major complex of tobacco manufacturing buildings was next to the Kentucky Hotel (these were likely built by Pleasant Partin), while Hatcher's factory was across Fifth Street on the north corner of Fifth and Polk. Lastly, a second facility owned by S.P. Halsey was on the south side of the intersection of Fifth Street and Park Avenue. Two examples of tobacco warehouses from the 19th century remain in the district. R.E. Gist's Plug and Twist Tobacco Factory (118-0075) and A.M. Bruce's Plug and Smoking Tobacco Factory (118-5318-0001) are both located in the 400 block of Court Street, and were constructed between 1877 and 1885.

In 1883, a new city fire station was constructed at 514 Fifth Street (118-5318-0011). "Fire Station No. 1," which boasted 15 men, 1 steam engine (pulled by 4 horses), 1 hose wagon (pulled by 2 horses), and 1 hook and ladder (pulled by 4 horses), served for more than four decades before being supplanted by a new Art Deco style facility designed by Clark and Crowe at the intersection of Fifth and Church Streets (demolished). Biggers School (called the "Fifth Avenue Public School" in 1890), located at the west corner of Clay and Fifth Streets, opened in 1881 with a capacity of 305 students. The large building was designed by Augustus Forsberg, and was demolished in 1967. Except for the school and the Gist, Bruce, and Halsey tobacco facilities, the "lower" end of Fifth Street (the 200–400 blocks) was primarily residential in nature during the last quarter of the nineteenth century. The 500 block contained a bakery & confectionery, two grocery stores, an ice cream parlor and dairy, a drug store, the Lynchburg Steam Laundry, and the newly constructed Fifth Street Fire Station (118-5318-0011), which was labeled "Fire Station No. 1." The 600 and 700 blocks of Fifth Street boasted 18 stores, a restaurant, wood working shop, and the former Phoenix Carriage Works at Fifth and Federal. Three of these stores remain, including the early 19th century buildings at 612 and 708 Fifth (118-5318-0018 and 118-5318-0027, respectively) and the circa 1850 brick building at 620 Fifth Street (118-5318-0021). The 900 and 1000 blocks of Fifth Street contained six grocery stores (including R.H. Padgett's store, which occupied an ancient c. 1800 store at the corner of Polk and Fifth that was demolished in the mid-20th century), two shoe stores, a candy store, a barber, and two tobacco factories (J.B. Evans & Son and Loyd Phelps & Co.).

By the end of the first quarter of the 20th century, the automobile had firmly taken hold in Lynchburg, and the burgeoning city was even home to the Piedmont Motor Car Company, one of only two companies in Virginia that actually manufactured automobiles (this factory was located just over a mile northwest of Fifth Street). New businesses were needed to serve the needs of the now-ubiquitous machines, and gas stations, tire stores, and other establishments began to spring up all over town. Some of the first auto-oriented development that took place along Fifth Street occurred in the previously residential 400 block. In 1928, the city directory announced that 400 Fifth Street was occupied by the Miller Tire & Battery Company, while the Lynchburg Battery & Ignition Company was located at 406 Fifth Street (both buildings are now joined, and are designated as 118-5317). Ferdinand D. Miller was the proprietor of Miller Tire & Battery at 406 Fifth Street, which sold Hood Tires and Willard Batteries. By 1935, the building was home to Goodyear Service Automobile Tires under the management of Oliver E. Miles. By 1940, the business was being operated under the name of "New Tread Company Vulcanizing" by D. Earl Burnett. The business specialized in recapping, retreading, and vulcanizing tires, and was a distributor for the U.S. Tire Company. Burnett purchased the building from E.H. Hancock in 1943, and was operating the Burnett-Benson Tire Company on the site by 1945. In addition to U.S. Tires, the business sold Seiberling Tires, radios, sporting goods, and home appliances. A 1945 advertisement boasted that they were the "most comprehensive tire service in Lynchburg." By 1955, Burnett-Benson Tire Company had been renamed to simply Burnett Tire Company, and the firm was selling aircraft parts in addition to their automotive parts and accessories. The next year, the company commissioned the architectural firm of Cress & Johnson to design a modern, streamlined facility across the street at what would become 403 Fifth Street (118-5318-0004).

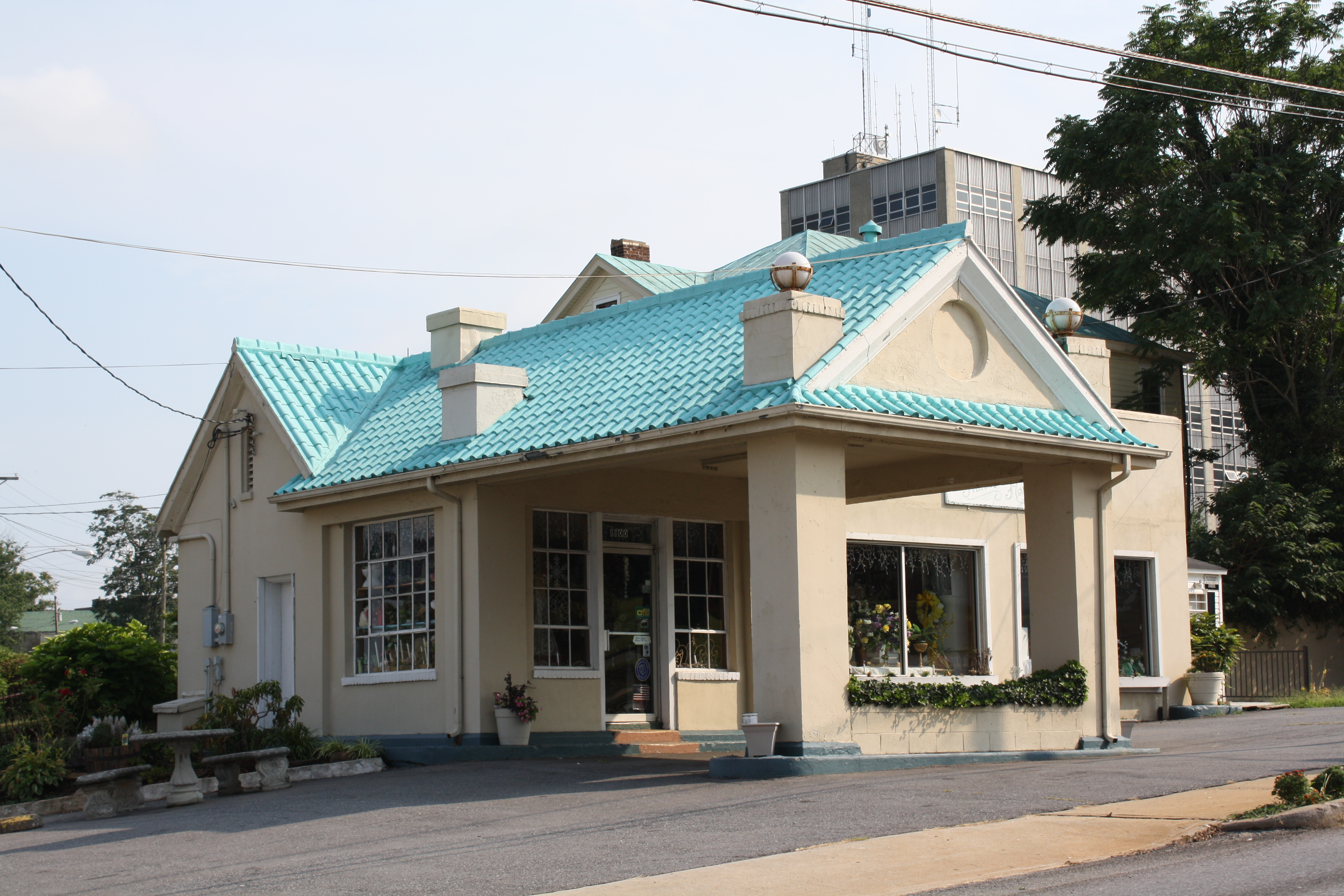
An early 20th-century filling station on Fifth Street

Also in 1927, the automobile showroom at 811 Fifth Street (118-5318-0034) was constructed to house three separate motor companies owned by Myers, Beasley, and Phil Payne. In the 1930s, the building was acquired by Adams Motor Company, which sold cars at the location through the end of the 20th century. The automobile dealership at 407 Federal Street (118-5237) was constructed in 1937 for the Pyramid Motor Corporation, which sold Ford and Lincoln Zephyr automobiles. After 1948, the business changed hands and was called Turner Buick Corporation. The name then changed to Dickerson Buick Corporation in 1955 and to Hemphill Buick-Opel, Inc. in 1970. The building was acquired by the Sheltered Workshop of Lynchburg in 1975, and was listed in the National Register of Historic Places in 2007.

Other purpose-built automobile-oriented commercial buildings in the district include filling stations at 1100 Fifth (118-5318-0051) and 801 Fifth (118-5318-0032), the Hoskins Pontiac Company showroom at 1101 Fifth (118-5318-0052), and the garages at 619 Fifth (118-5318-0020), 420 Monroe (118-5318-0056), and 507 Harrison Street (118-5318-0022).

In 1930, the Lynchburg firm of Johnson and Brannan designed a new bus terminal at the intersection of Fifth and Church Streets for A.F. Young, operator of the nearby Virginian Hotel at 726 Church Street (118-5163-0076). This Greyhound depot (demolished) was the first of two such facilities constructed along Fifth Street, which was part of Lynchburg's primary north-south transportation network. In 1953, a Trailways bus station was constructed at 512 Fifth Street (118-5318-0010). Several residential and commercial buildings along Fifth Street were demolished to make room for the station, and in 1962, the building became known as the Union Bus Station, serving both Trailways and Greyhound passengers. At this time, additional houses along Clay and Madison Streets were demolished to provide larger parking areas. According to Greyhound officials, this instance was the first time (in company history) that the two bus lines had shared a single facility.

In 1931, Fifth Street was designated as U.S. Highway 29, which connected Maryland to Florida. Following the construction of the Lynchburg Expressway, Fifth Street was redesignated as U.S. 29's business route. While long-distance traffic may have decreased, local traffic was on the rise as Lynchburg grew and the Fifth Street corridor found itself between downtown and the midtown area, which contained Pittman Plaza (Lynchburg's first shopping center), which was completed in 1960. To increase traffic flow, on-street parking was removed from Fifth Street in order to create two lanes of southbound traffic. In the early 1970s, the Virginia Department of Transportation developed a plan to further increase traffic flow through the area by turning Fourth Street (a narrow residential neighborhood-serving roadway) into a one-way thoroughfare for vehicular traffic, while converting Fifth Street to all one-way in the opposite direction. This plan, along with the assumed significant right-of-way acquisitions that would need to be made in order to enact it, had a chilling effect on any reinvestment that might have otherwise occurred along Fifth Street. Like downtown Lynchburg (and most other downtowns during the 1970s), the Fifth Street commercial district suffered a decline due to large shopping areas including Pittman Plaza and River Ridge Mall, which opened in the early 1980s.

=== African American Commercial & Cultural Center ===
Following the Civil War, African Americans realized new opportunities as well as limitations. While amendments to the United States Constitution abolished slavery and granted citizenship to African Americans, a new system of racial discrimination, known as "Jim Crow," soon emerged. The majority-controlled society denied African Americans access to respectable jobs and many commercial services, and African Americans formed parallel economies in their own communities.

During the late 1880s, most of Fifth Street was predominantly occupied by white residents or business owners. The 400, 600, and 900 blocks had close to twenty percent African American occupancy, while the 1000 block and beyond was generally occupied by a black majority. By 1900, the percentage of African American residents began to increase somewhat, particularly along the 900 block of Fifth Street. By 1910, an African American-dominated business district had evolved in the three block area between Federal and Monroe Streets. Black business owners may have obtained a foothold in the district due to opportunities created by a weak economy in the early years of reconstruction, but the African American business community's rise to prominence was not simply due to passive acceptance of what may have been considered undesirable property by the white business community. Rather, several successful black business leaders, along with newly formed fraternal and social organizations, made significant investments in the corridor by constructing a number of large commercial buildings in the late 19th and early 20th centuries. The vanguard of these black business owners included boot and shoe makers Pitman Walker and James Ross, grocer Nelson James, and barber J.O. Ross, who were all operating in the 1000 block of Fifth Street as early as 1881.

During this time, many black fraternal organizations were formed, "creating social outlets for those seeking camaraderie as well as a sense of belonging in the face of a larger society that neglected them." These groups promoted the concept of "self-help," and played a key role in development of a black middle class in southern cities like Lynchburg.

By 1872, African American men in Lynchburg formed a local chapter of the Order of True Reformers, a fraternal organization. In 1893, they constructed the landmark building known as the True Reformers Hall (later known as the Harrison Theatre) in the 900 block of Fifth Street on the site of Pleasant Partin's tobacco factory. Perhaps the first "mixed use" building on Fifth Street, the massive three-story edifice contained a large auditorium, offices, a lodge hall for the True Reformers, and several storefronts at street level. Perhaps as important for its cultural, social, and commercial contribution to the district as its architecture, the True Reformers Hall was demolished in 1985.

The African American population in Lynchburg was on the decline by the late 19th century, largely due to the reduction of employees needed in the various tobacco warehouses and factories in the city, which were major employers of blacks. Newer industries in the area, including cotton mills and shoe factories, only employed white laborers (due to necessity if for no other reason, many of these companies would later employ blacks). Despite the reduced role that tobacco played in Lynchburg's economy, the Stalling & Company tobacco factory, which occupied the former Myers building at Fourth and Federal Streets, employed area residents well into the 20th century. James B. Harvey (1928-1984) worked at the Stallings Factory in the 1950s. His son, Richard, later wrote that he "went to visit my father once at the Tobacco Factory on Fourth Street…His boss cursed and talked to him as if he was less than a dog. I swore, not one time in my life, would I be subjected to this bigotry." Dubois Miller worked at the factory one summer, and he later recounted that he would "come home smelling like tobacco, and I didn't smoke, so I didn't appreciate it. But I needed the money for school, and it was seasonal work." The G. Stalling & Co. Factory was destroyed by fire in 1976.

As educational and economic opportunities for African Americans increased, entrepreneurism also increased. In 1904, Lynchburg's black population operated 2 billiard saloons, 2 theatres, and 2 livery stables. There were 3 African American physicians or veterinary surgeons, 3 undertakers, 2 attorneys, 5 hucksters (street vendors), 1 plumber, 1 electrical contractor, 1 chiropodist, 23 barbers, 27 merchants, and 32 houses of private entertainment (private lodging facilities that did not serve alcohol) .. Thus, to some extent, the black community began to mitigate the effects of segregation in the industrial workplace with their own business opportunities, many of which operated on Fifth Street (or Fifth Avenue, as it was sometimes called during this period).

By 1900, the Kentucky Hotel (118-0177), a former tavern and residence, was the home to Smith's Business College, which provided educational opportunities to African Americans. Its students included Rev. George Robert Jones of Suffolk, who graduated in 1897. An 1899 advertisement in the Richmond Planet announced that the school offered courses in "phonographic, penning, commercial, English…", and a 1908 publication lauded T. Parker Smith, the school's director, as "one of the pioneers" in the work of training African Americans in the principles of business. Smith, a Missouri native who graduated from Lincoln University in 1888, married Clara Alexander of Lynchburg. By 1911, they had moved to Durham, North Carolina, where he was the Dean of the Commercial Department at the National Religious Training School, and Clara served as the head of the Teacher's Department. By 1934, Smith was operating a new Smith's Business College in Kansas City, Missouri.

In 1915, local African American businessman Adolphus Humbles (1845-1926) built what is known as the Humbles Building (118-5318-0039) at 901 Fifth Street. Like the True Reformers Hall, the Humbles Building is a large, three-story, mixed use facility that contained two storefronts on the first floor and an auditorium on the second floor. Humbles was a successful merchant in Campbell County, and operated the toll road between Lynchburg and Rustburg (the seat of Campbell County). He served as the Treasurer of both the Virginia State Baptist Convention and the Virginia Theological Seminary and College (now known as the Virginia University of Lynchburg), where the school's main building bears his name. Also active in politics, he served as Chairman of the Campbell County Executive Committee for the Republican Party for thirteen years.

In 1919, the former Gist Tobacco Factory at 410 Court Street (118-0075) was converted into Mill No. 2 of the Lynchburg Hosiery Mills Company (Mill No. 1 [118-0126] was on Fort Avenue), which had the specific purpose of employing African American women. At the time, it was said that no other business or industry in Lynchburg had hired black women, who, up until this point, were limited to performing domestic work in white households. Mill No. 2 operated until 1971, and generally employed between 150 and 200 black women at any given time. As at Mill No. 1, the segregated employees of Mill No. 2 formed a "Lynchburg Hosiery Mills Association," which provided benefits including an early form of medical insurance, disability benefits, unemployment benefits, and savings plans. When the Civil Rights Act was passed in 1964, the two separate Lynchburg Hosiery Mill Associations were merged, and both black and white employees then belonged to the same association.

As previously mentioned, three African American undertakers were in business in Lynchburg at the turn of the century. John Shuemaker & Co. operated at 417 Monroe Street, and was a former partner with Squire Higginbotham. Their funeral home, established in 1868, is thought to be the oldest black business of the type in Lynchburg. Squire's son, McGustavus (1868-1934), owned the firm of Strange & Higginbotham, which was located at 909 Fifth Street (118-5318-0040). This business was the predecessor to the current Community Funeral Home, which was established by M.W. "Teedy" Thornhill, Jr. Thornhill served on Lynchburg City Council from 1976 to 1992, and in 1990, was elected as Lynchburg's first African American mayor. C.V. Wilson's Funeral Home was located at 810 Fifth Street, but was demolished in 1968 to make additional car lot space for Adams Motor Company. Carl Hutcherson, Sr. erected a new funeral home at 918 Fifth Street (118-5318-0042) in 1963. Hutcherson was the first African American to serve on the Lynchburg School Board, and his son, the Rev. Carl B. Hutcherson, Jr., took over the mortuary business, served on Lynchburg City Council from 1996 to 2006 (he was Mayor from 2000 to 2006).

On March 5, 1918, a group of African American women rented the house at 613 Monroe Street (118-5318-0061) in order to begin Y.W.C.A. programs for women of color. Soon after, Adela Ruffin, Field Secretary for all black Y.W.C.A. participants in the South, came to Lynchburg to encourage local leadership to create a separate chapter, but her suggestion was tabled. In 1919, however, an official Phyllis Wheatley Branch was formed in Lynchburg, and 15 African American women established a Committee of Management. The Central Association (white-controlled organization), located on Church Street, offered to help the Phyllis Wheatley Branch in "any way that it could, but was unable to assist financially." In 1924, the trustees of the Old Dominion Elks Lodge #181, who had purchased 613 Monroe from the Merchants National Bank of Raleigh in 1919, sold the house to the Y.W.C.A. for $4,000.

In 1937, it was reported that the branch had outgrown their building at 613 Monroe, and that a committee had been formed to evaluate their options. While the branch had saved money for renovations through the years, they would also need to obtain support from the community. Amy Jordan, a teacher at a "colored college" (Virginia Theological Seminary) was the chairman of the Committee of Management, and Grace Booker, a native of Columbus, Ohio, was Executive Secretary of the branch. Later, Booker became the first African American Director of the Metropolitan Y.W.C.A. in Baltimore.

An undated brochure produced by the Phyllis Wheatley Y.W.C.A. sought to raise $45,000 for the purpose of moving the branch from its house at 613 Monroe Street, which was labeled as "Old—Outgrown" to a larger building at 600 Monroe Street, which was labeled "Modern—Adequate." 600 Monroe Street was known as the "Tal-Fred Apartments" (118-5318-0060), and was built circa 1940 on property formerly occupied by the Independent Order of St. Luke. The newly constructed apartment building appears to have contained six spacious units, all of which were occupied by African Americans. The Phyllis Wheatley Branch apparently raised the necessary funds to acquire the property, and hired prominent Lynchburg architect Pendleton S. Clark to plan modifications to the building's interior. The Y.W.C.A. branch moved into the building by 1950, and it is still owned by the organization today. The Y.W.C.A. program in Lynchburg was integrated in the early 1970s.

In 1924, the house at 1014 Fifth Street (118-5318-0049) was occupied by the Elks Rest, a facility for African Americans. In 1936, Willis Sandidge was the manager of the Elks Rest, and Old Dominion Lodge #181, IBPOE (Elks) used the building as its principal office and meeting location. In need of additional assembly space, the organization added a large concrete masonry unit addition to the rear of the building by 1951, and the grocery store operated by James Harper and later Robert Miller at 1016 Fifth Street was incorporated into the Elks Lodge complex.

For most of the first half of the 20th century, the Kentucky Hotel (118-0177) at 900 Fifth Street served as the Odd Fellows Hall, with rental office space on the first floor and the second floor contained the lodge hall itself. In 1954, the building housed the Grand Order of the Odd Fellows, Odd Fellows Lodge No. 1475, St. Luke's Lodge No. 1475, Sons of Zion Lodge No. 1446, and West Hill Lodge No. 1704.

By 1962, the Augustine Leftwich House at 614 Federal Street (118-5318-0063) began a new life as the "Masonic Home." Joseph C. Watson resided at the house (perhaps as a manager or caretaker) and the building housed the Star of the West Lodge No. 24 (AF&AM), Order of the Eastern Star Lynchburg Chapter No. 40, and Order of the Eastern Star Goodwill Chapter No. 125 (all of these were African American organizations). The building at 614 Federal Street continues to serve the Star of the West Lodge today.

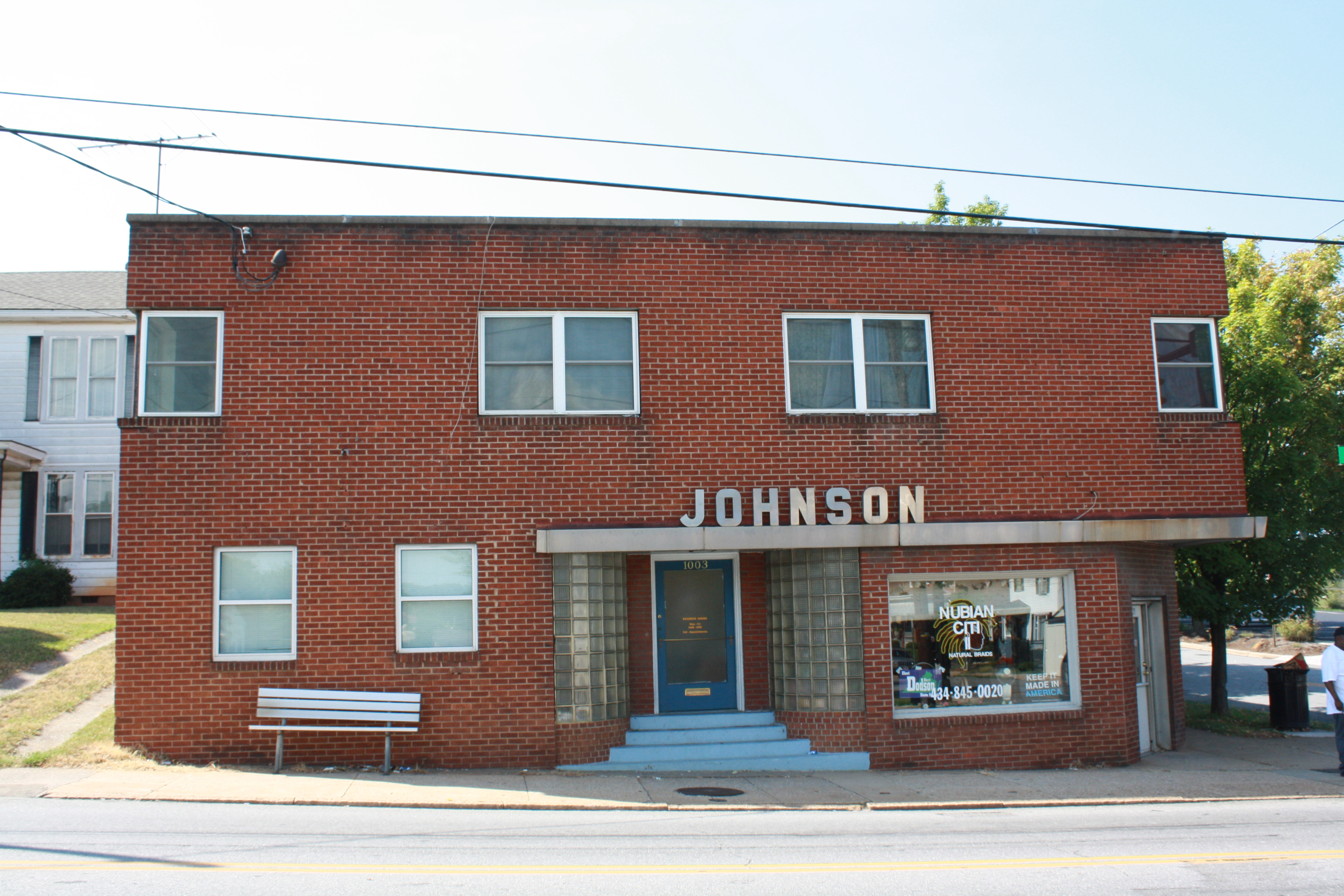
Walter Johnson Medical Office

In addition to serving as the "Main Street" of Lynchburg's African American community, the corridor served as the community's health and medicine center. By 1940, all but one of Lynchburg's black physicians as well as all four black dentists had offices on Fifth Street. Perhaps Lynchburg's best-known African American physician, Dr. R. Walter Johnson (1889-1971) attended Lincoln University and Meharry Medical College. His Lynchburg practice began in the mid-1930s, and was first located in the Humbles Building at 901 Fifth Street (118-5318-0039). In 1951, he constructed the office building at 1001 Fifth Street (118-5318-0047), which still bears his name in large aluminum letters along the façade. He was the first African American to be allowed to practice at Lynchburg General Hospital, and became a well-known tennis coach for young African American players, including Arthur Ashe and Althea Gibson. He founded the American Tennis Association Junior Development Program for African American youth as well as an all-expenses paid tennis camp. His home and tennis court at 1422 Pierce Street (118-0225-0077) were individually listed in the National Register of Historic Places in 2002, and Centra Health's outpatient clinic at 320 Federal Street is named in his honor. His sister, Dr. Eileen El-Dorado Johnson, was educated in Switzerland and worked in New York before moving to Lynchburg in 1967, where she established a practice on Fifth Street.

Dr. Fred L. Lander, Jr. (1898-1941) a veteran of World War I, had an office at the corner of Fifth and Polk Streets (demolished in 1992). He was one of the first African American physicians to use sulfa drugs to treat venereal diseases, a serious health problem during the 1930s, when three times as many Virginia blacks as whites died of syphilis. Dr. Leon Braswell's (1904-1958) office was located at 808 Fifth Street (demolished); he practiced from 1937 to 1958. In 1949, he was named state Vice President of the National Medical Association. Dr. Clarissa Wimbush (d. 1986) was the first black female dentist in Virginia, and earned her D.D.S. degree from Howard University. She opened an office at 911-913 Fifth (demolished 1979) in 1926, and practiced more than fifty years.

Dr. Augustus Nathaniel Lushington (1869-1939) was born on Trinidad in the West Indies and is believed to be one of the first African Americans in the country to receive a degree in veterinary medicine, which he earned at the University of Pennsylvania in 1897. His home and practice was located in the house at 1005 Fifth Street (118-5318-0048). From 1959 until he retired, Dr. Kyle M. Pettus (1881-1967) occupied Lushington's house.

In all, more than twenty physicians practiced on Fifth Street, primarily in the 800–1000 blocks. The Humbles Building hosted at least nine doctors and dentists over the years. In support of the many physicians along the corridor was pharmacists Harry W. Reid (1892-1969). Reid opened his pharmacy, first called Bacchus & Reid, in 1919 at the Humbles Building. By 1930, there were twenty-one black-owned drugstores in the State of Virginia. The 1940 Lincoln Memorial Book of Lynchburg (a locally produced African American business and cultural directory) stated that Reid's "place of business is thoroughly modern, in appearance and in every other respect. It is the only drug store in the city owned and operated by colored people and it is a real credit to Lynchburg." In 1936, Reid moved his business to the New Era building, a large mixed-use facility (similar to the Humbles Building and the True Reformers Hall) located at 919 Fifth Street (it was demolished in 1992).

African Americans with medical training were not the only benefactors of Lynchburg's health care community. Whit N. Brown (1895-1946) was a New York native and enjoyed success as a "real estate proprietor" in Lynchburg. Locally, he was known as the "King of Fifth Street." His lifelong friend, Harry Reid, later recounted that Brown "was very honest in his thoughts. The Negroes have been working since 1925 to get a hospital of their own, but Whit wouldn't agree. 'Lynchburg Hospital belongs to the whole city,' he told them, 'us as much as anybody, and we don't want to improve and pay for what we get over there.'" When Brown died in 1946, he donated his entire estate to Lynchburg General Hospital, including the brick duplex at 411-413 Polk Street (118-5318-0043) that he had constructed as rental property only six years earlier. Lynchburg General Hospital kept the building (likely earning income from residential rentals) until 1971.

The Lynchburg Branch of the N.A.A.C.P. (National Association for the Advancement of Colored People) sponsored the Legacy Project to provide educational exhibits and programs on the history and culture of African Americans in the area. The Legacy Project received 501(c)3 nonprofit status in 1995 and acquired a dilapidated house at 403 Monroe Street two years later. Lynchburg architect Kelvin Moore was engaged to help transform the 100-year-old house into a modern museum. A Capital Fundraising Committee was formed to raise $300,000, and a Collections Committee was formed to solicit and archive artifacts for the permanent collection. On June 25, 2000 a celebratory dedication and grand opening was held, and the Legacy Museum of African American History hosts a number of changing exhibits about black culture in the region.

== Fifth Street Today ==
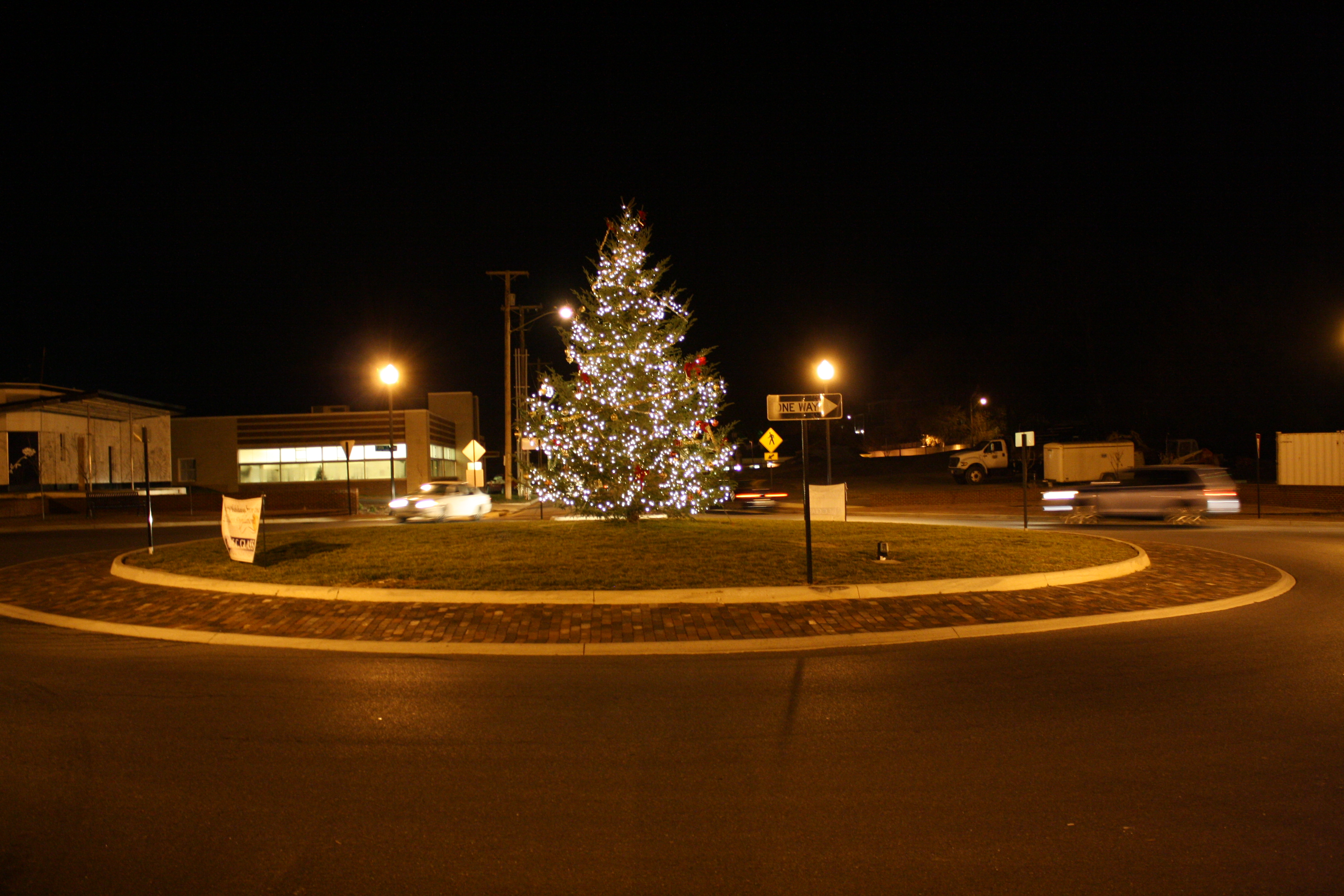
Fifth Street Roundabout during the Christmas Season

For more than two centuries, Fifth Street has served as a major commercial and transportation artery for Lynchburg, and served as the heart of the region's African American community for over 100 years. Like many urban neighborhoods, the Fifth Street Historic District has suffered architectural losses over the years, but still retains the feeling and character of an urban business district. The first decade of the 21st century has been witness to renewed community interest in the corridor, which has been championed by organizations including the Fifth Street Community Development Corporation (the CDC) and the Lynchburg Neighborhood Development Foundation (LNDF). LNDF was instrumental in expanding the boundaries of the Court House Hill-Downtown Historic District (118-5163), rehabilitating a number of homes in the 500–700 blocks of Madison and Harrison Streets, and served as the developer for Centra Health's P.A.C.E. Center, which is located in the Pyramid Motors Building (118-5237). The CDC, along with the City of Lynchburg, spearheaded the development of the 2006 Fifth Street Master Plan. The CDC and LNDF are currently collaborating to rehabilitate several buildings in the 700 block of Fifth Street (two of which were slated for demolition by their former owner in early 2011). The second phase of a major three-phase streetscape and utility infrastructure improvement was completed in 2013.

== Gallery ==
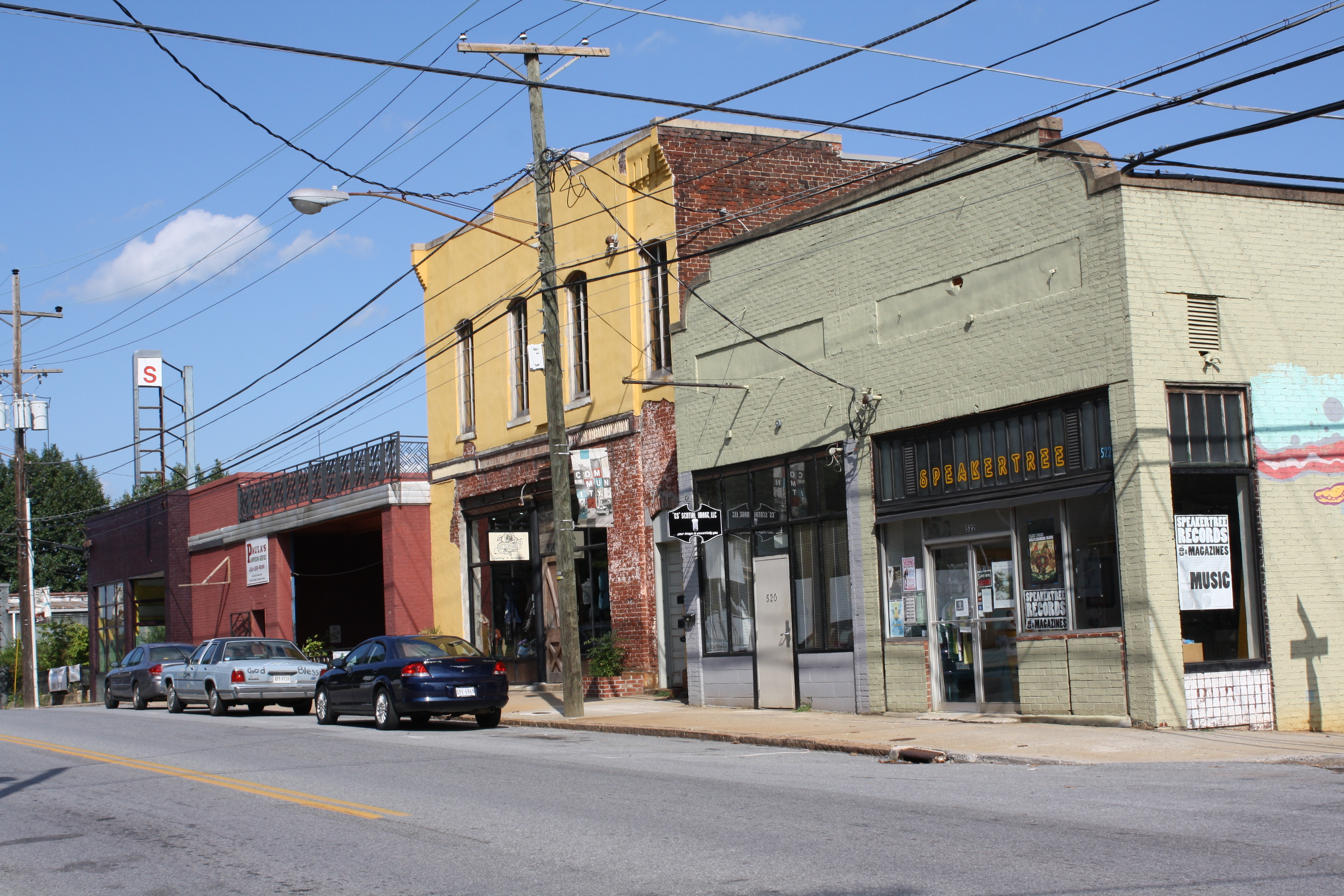
600 Block Fifth Street, Fifth Street Historic District, Lynchburg, Virginia, United States, 2011

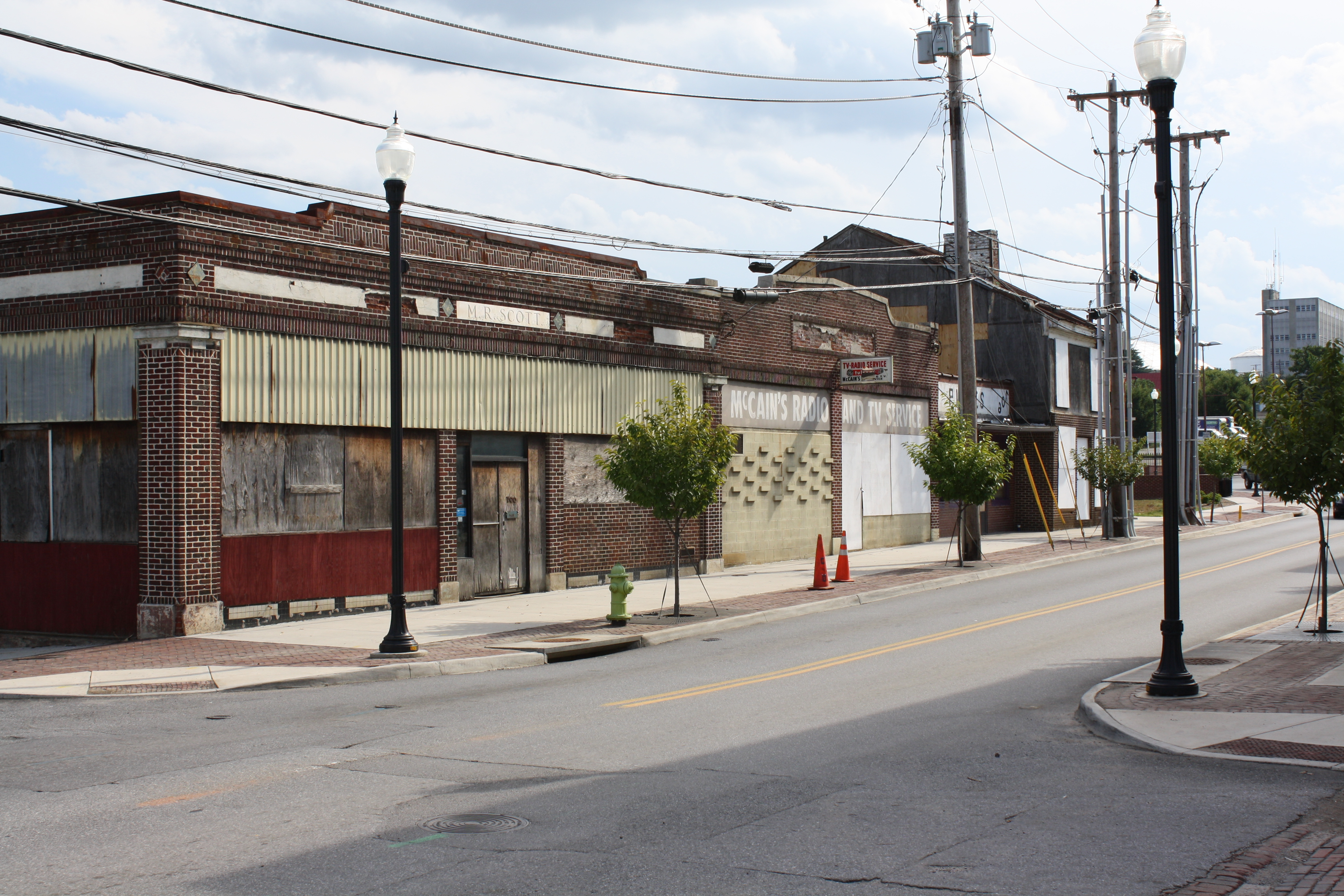
700 Block Fifth Street, Fifth Street Historic District, Lynchburg, Virginia, United States, 2011

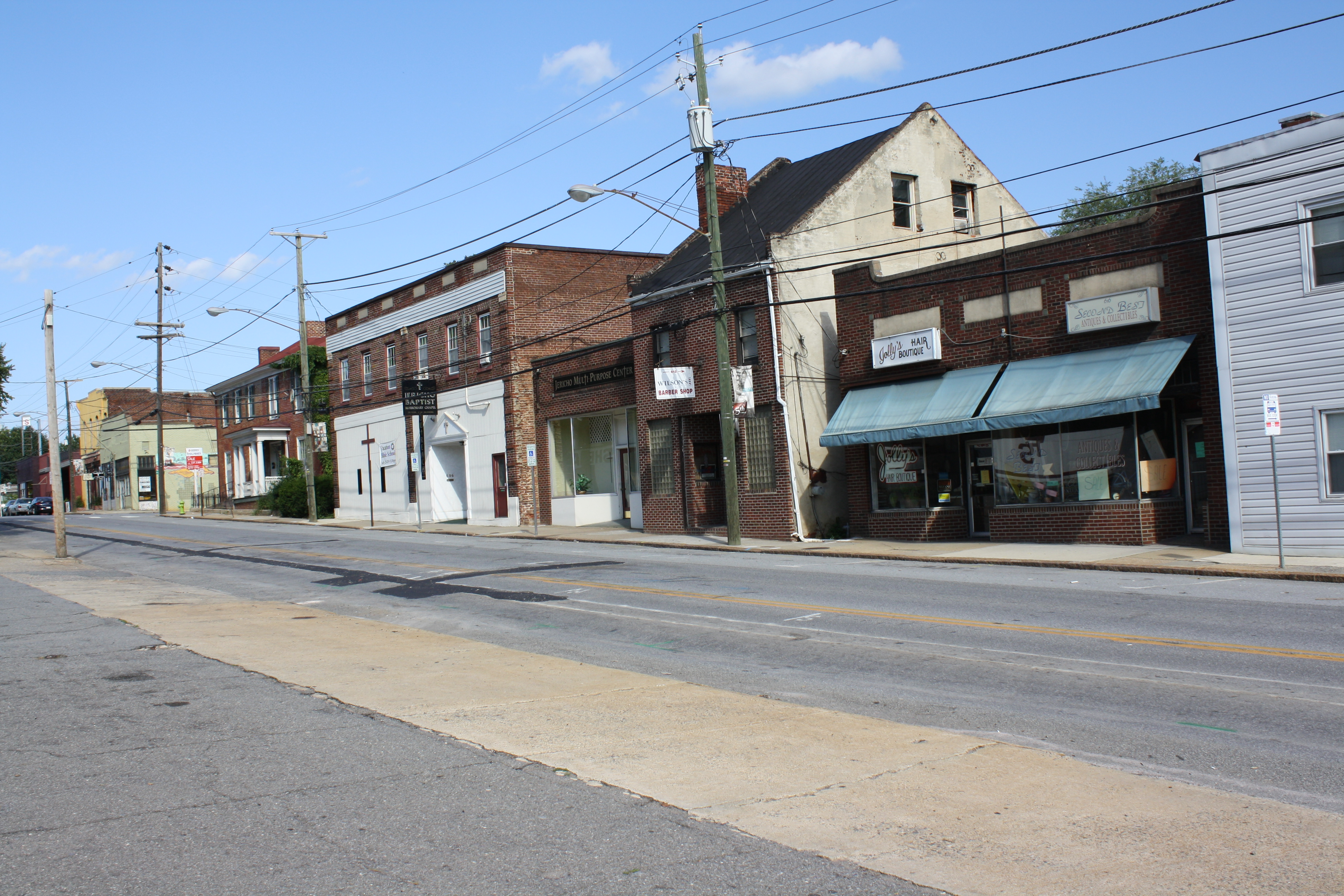
700 Block Fifth Street, Fifth Street Historic District, Lynchburg, Virginia, United States, 2011

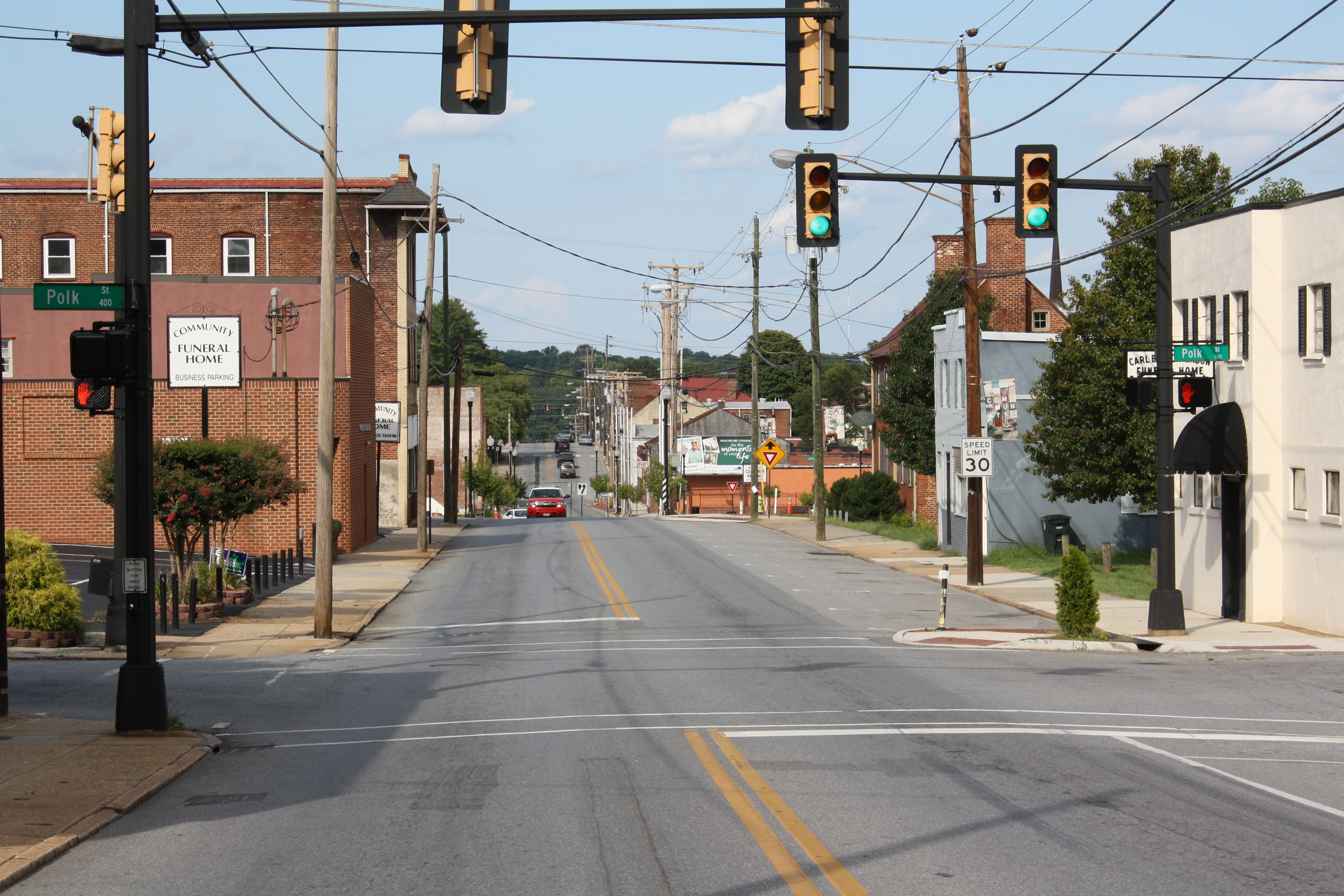
900 Block Fifth Street, Fifth Street Historic District, Lynchburg, Virginia, United States, 2011

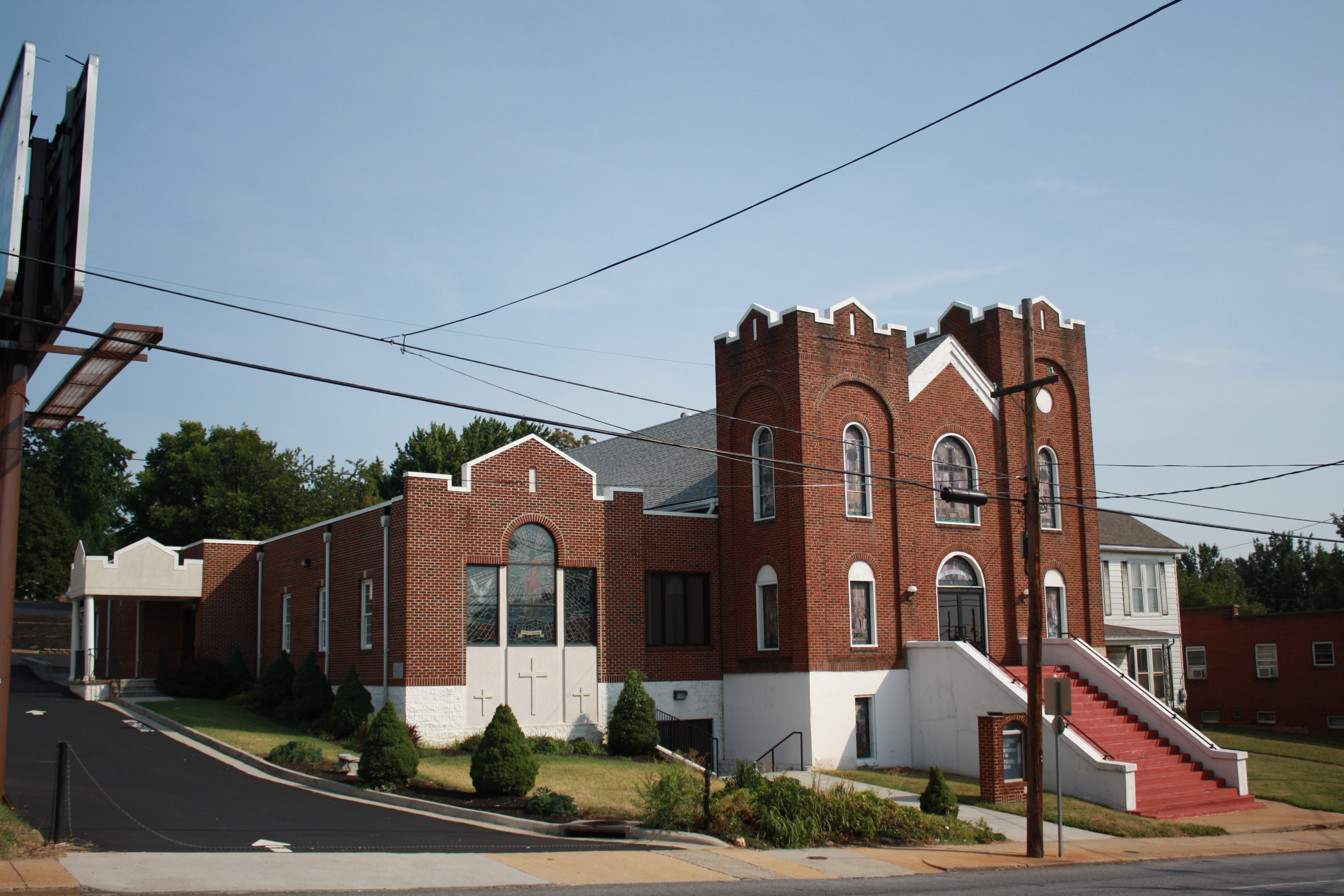
Fifth Street Baptist Church, Fifth Street Historic District, Lynchburg, Virginia, United States, 2011

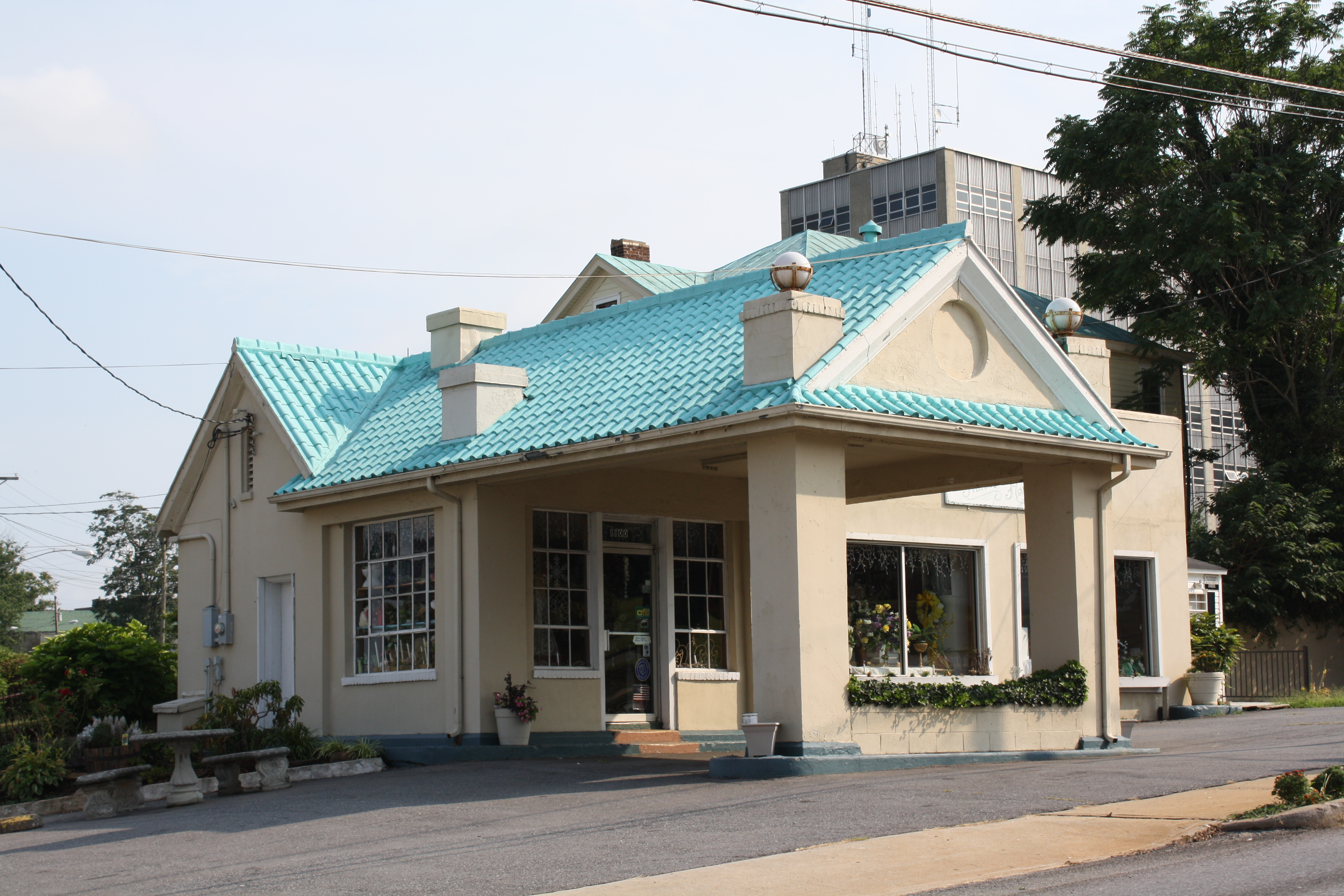
Gas Station, Fifth Street Historic District, Lynchburg, Virginia, United States, 2011

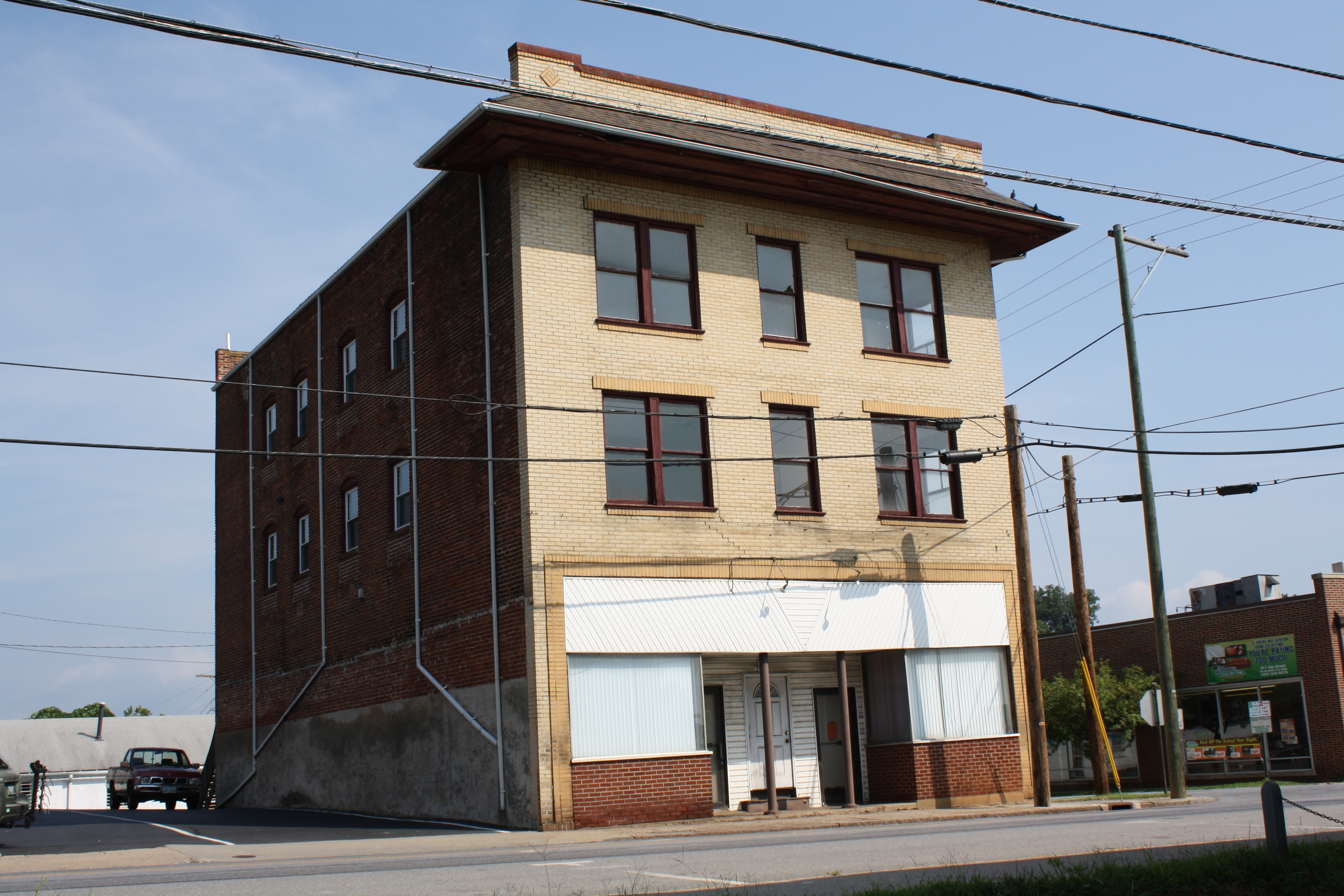
Humbles Building, Fifth Street Historic District, Lynchburg, Virginia, United States, 2011

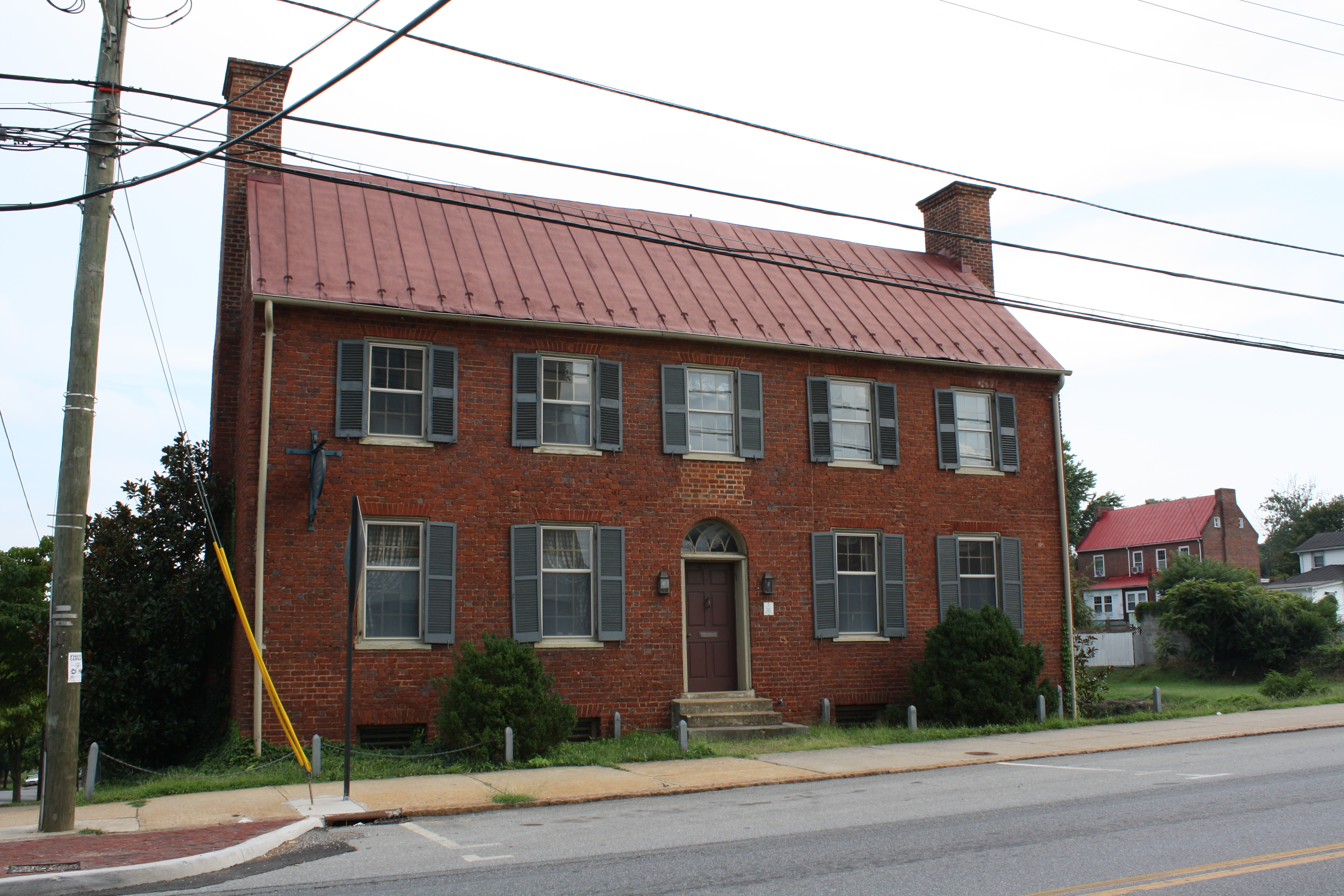
Kentucky Hotel, Fifth Street Historic District, Lynchburg, Virginia, United States, 2011

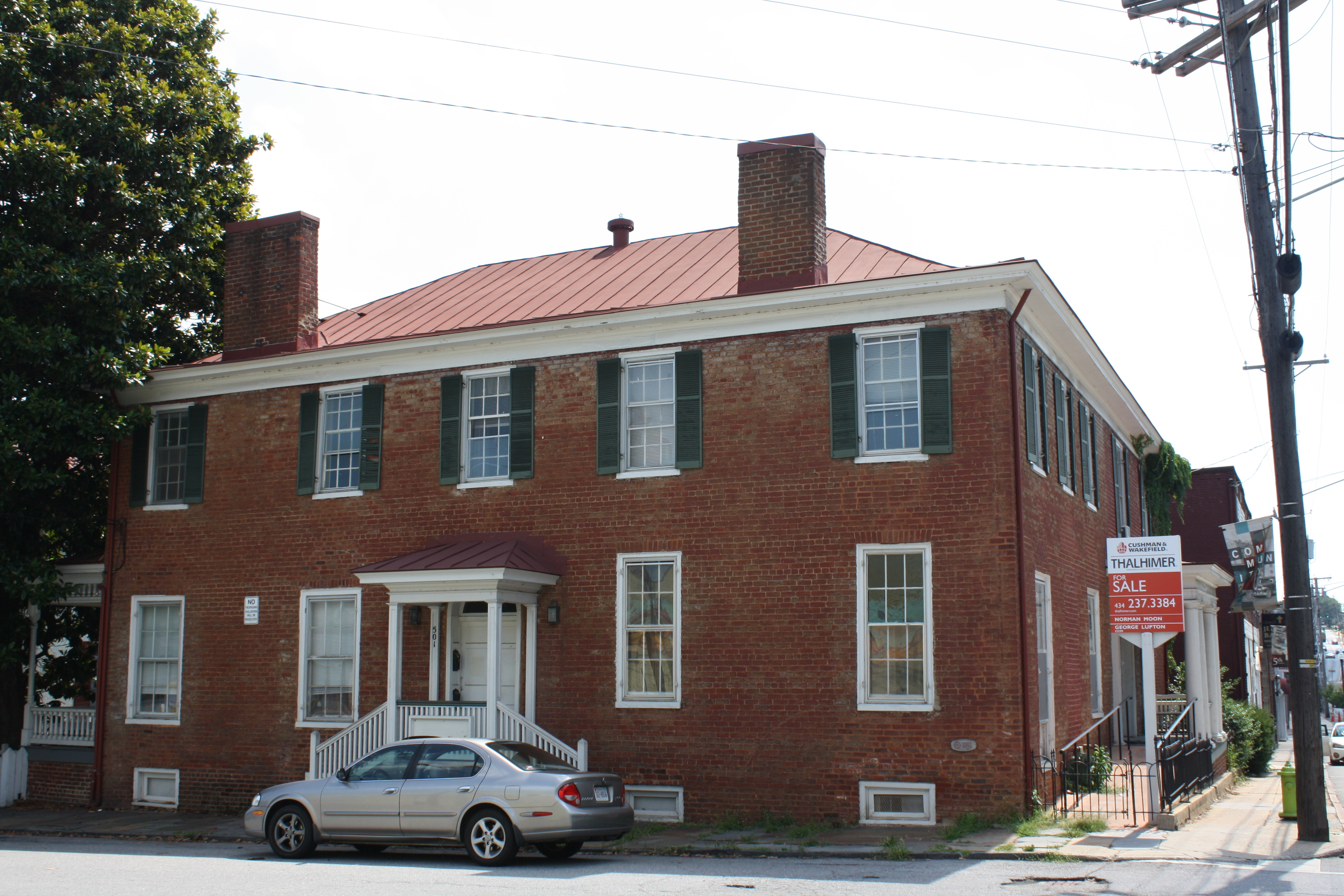
Nichols Tavern, Fifth Street Historic District, Lynchburg, Virginia, United States, 2011

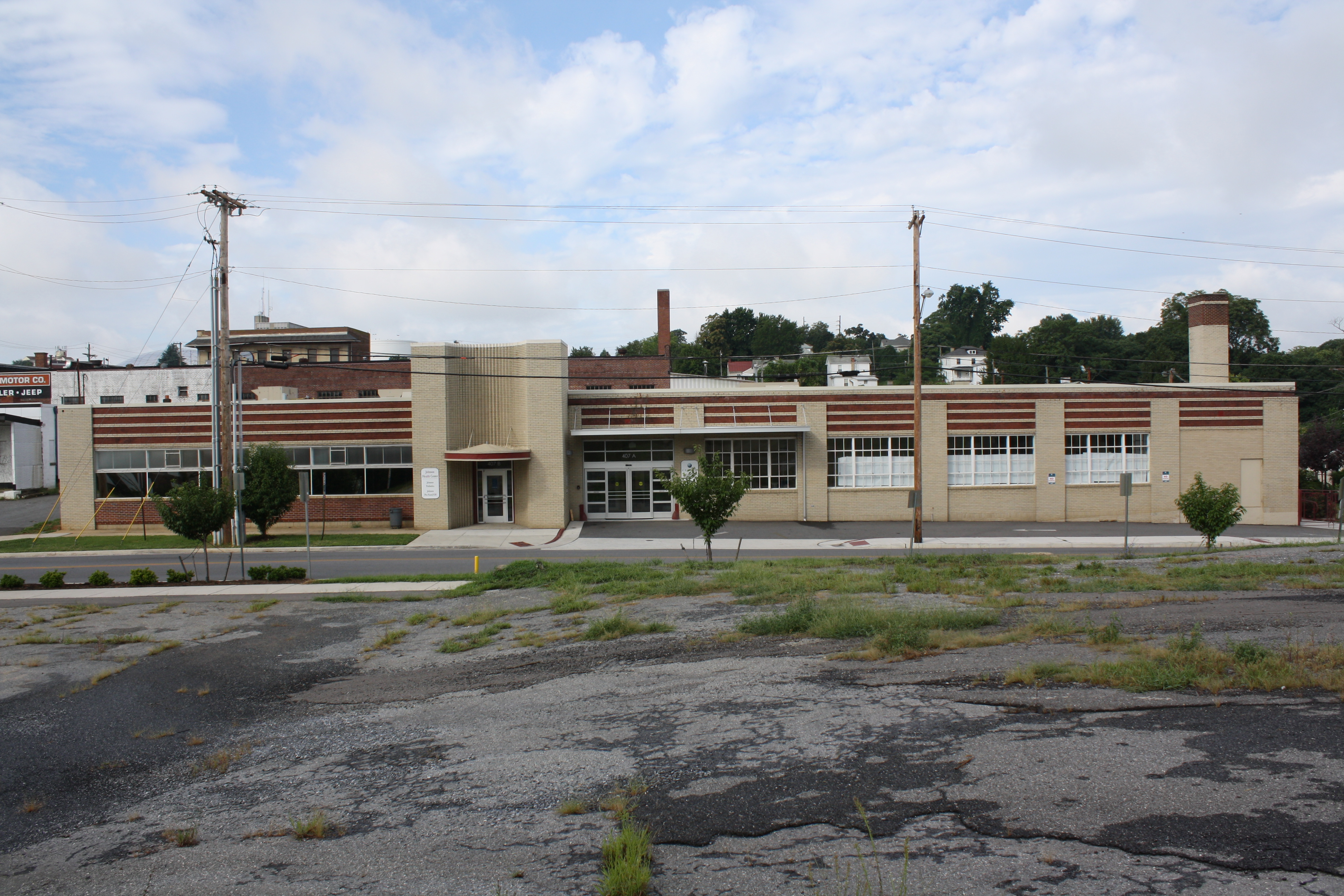
Pyramid Motors, Fifth Street Historic District, Lynchburg, Virginia, United States, 2011

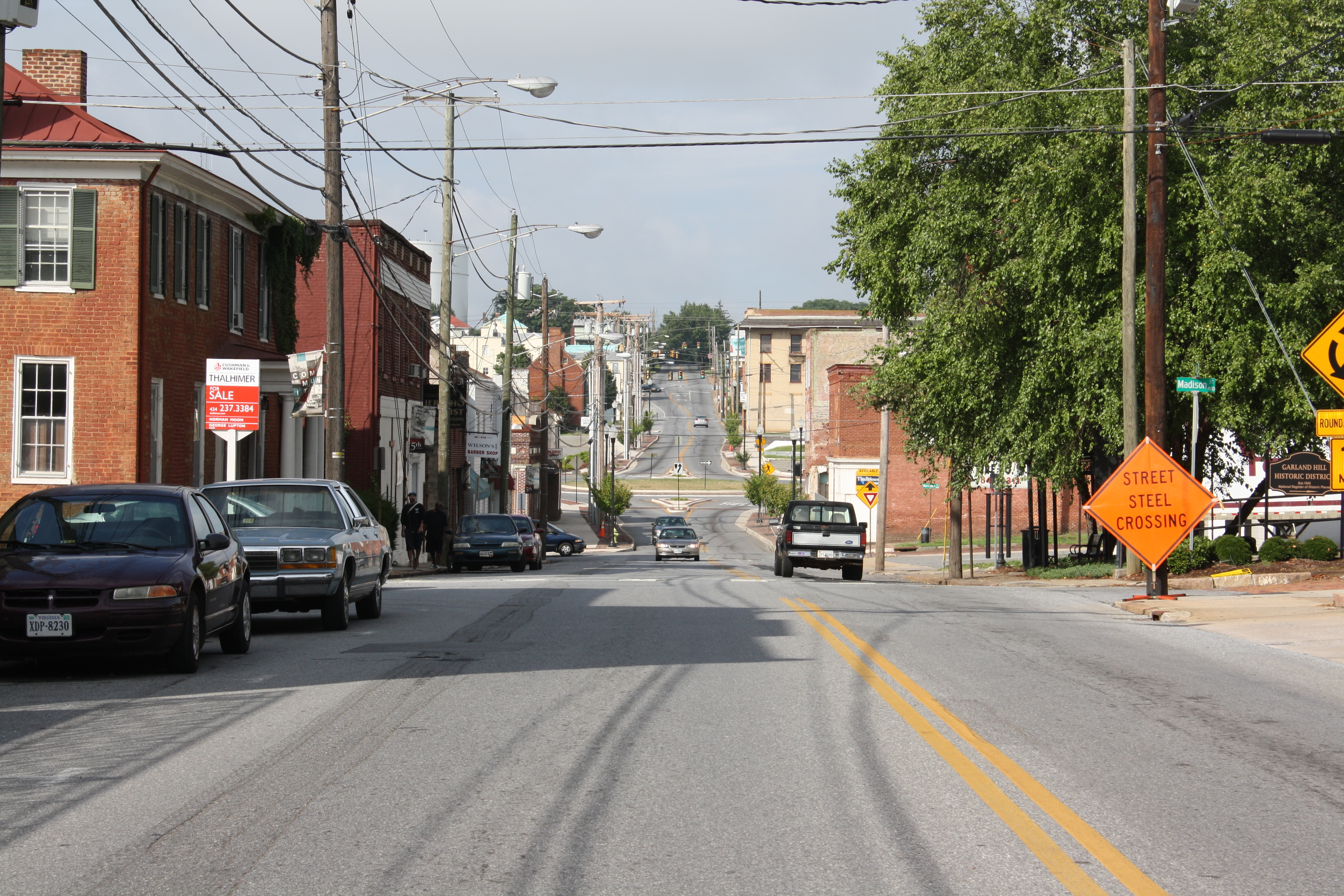
Streetscape, Fifth Street Historic District, Lynchburg, Virginia, United States, 2011

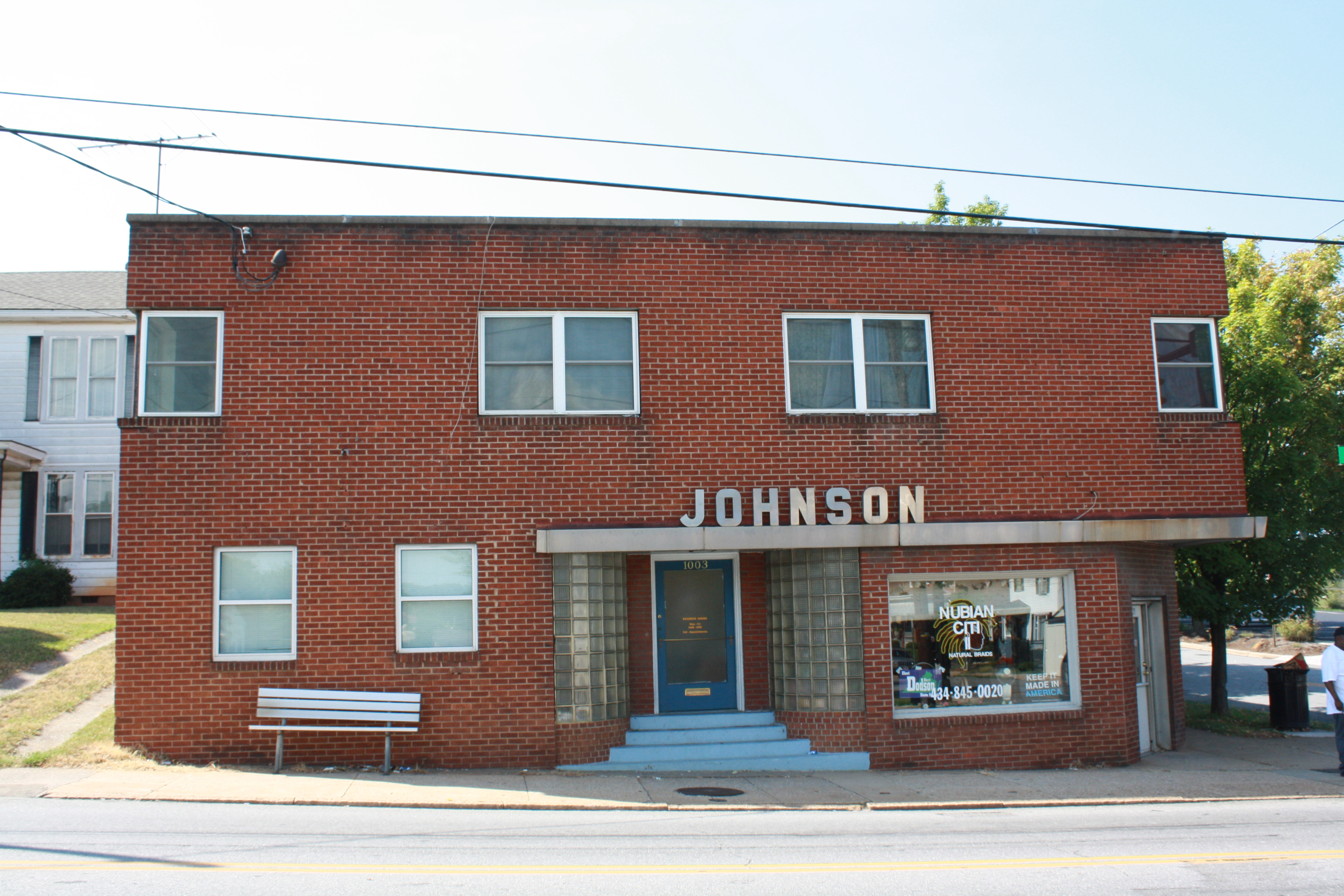
Walter Johnson Medical Office, Fifth Street Historic District, Lynchburg, Virginia, United States, 2011

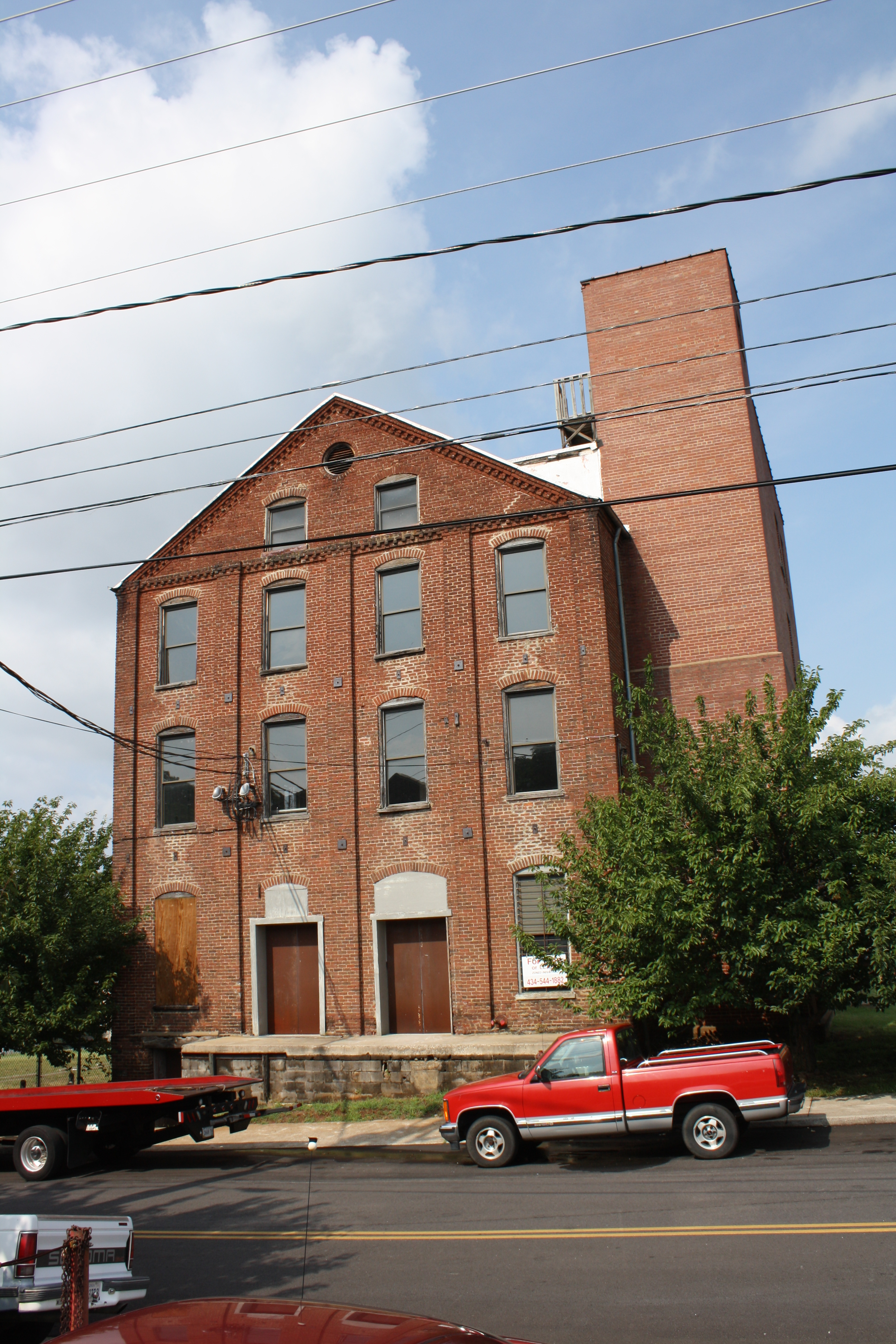
Gist Tobacco Factory, Fifth Street Historic District, Lynchburg, Virginia, United States, 2011
