= The Most Dangerous Animal in the World =

1963 Bronx Zoo exhibit

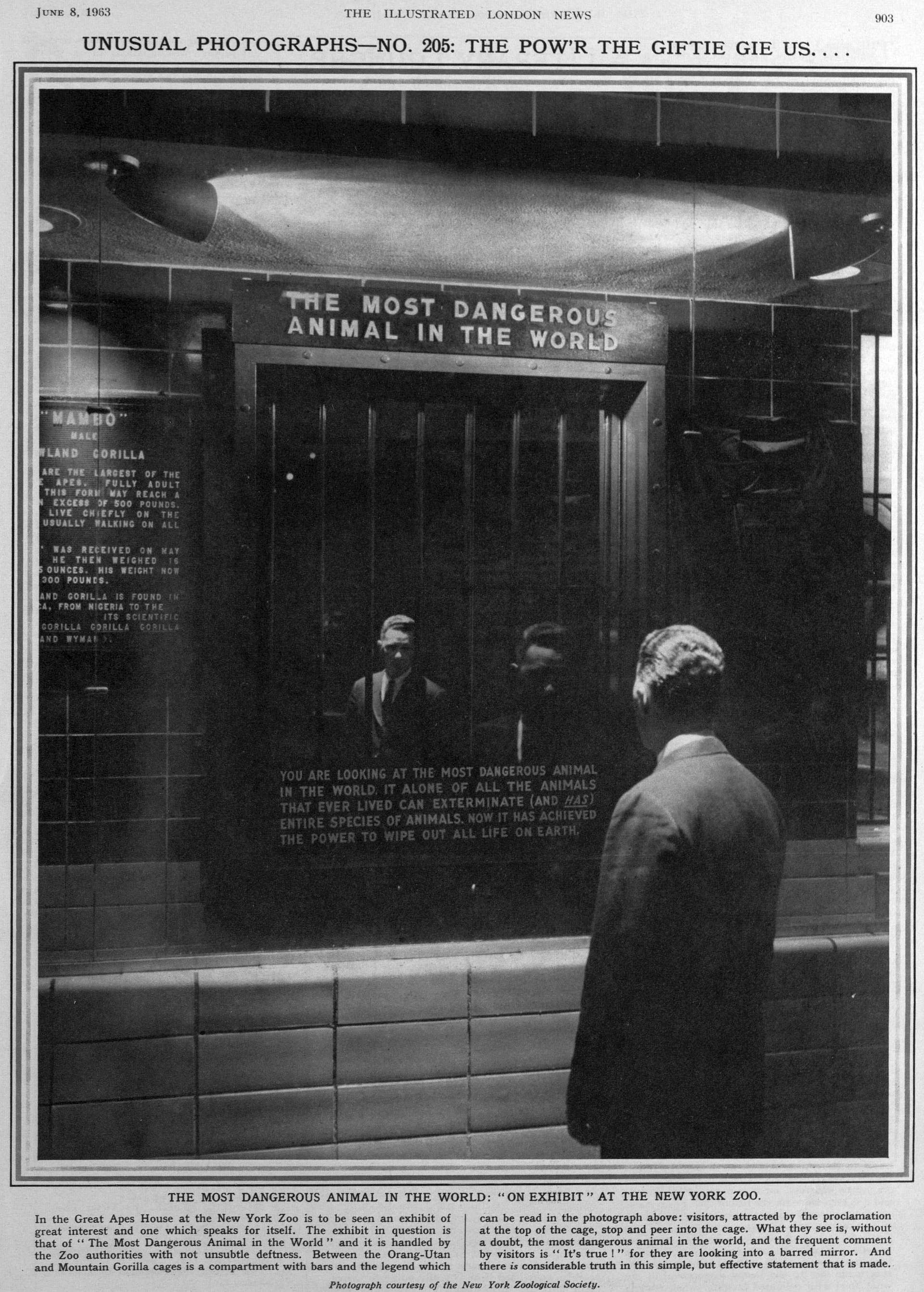
Cover of the 8 June 1963 Illustrated London Times issue, featuring a man viewing the exhibit at the Bronx Zoo

The Most Dangerous Animal in the World was a 1963 exhibit at the Bronx Zoo in the Bronx, a borough of New York City. It featured a mirror and text describing the dangers humans pose to life on earth. In 1968 the exhibit was duplicated at Brookfield Zoo in Chicago.

== History ==
The Most Dangerous Animal in the World exhibit debuted at the Bronx Zoo on April 26, 1963. The story about the exhibit was picked up and reprinted throughout the United States. In 1963 the exhibit was also reported on in The Illustrated London News. There was also an accompanying photograph courtesy of the New York Zoological Society. The exhibit was installed at the Great Apes House.

== Exhibit ==
The words: "The most dangerous animal in the world" were printed in red on top of a cage. Behind the bars of the cage, there was a mirror. The exhibit allowed the human visitors to peer into the cage and see their reflection — marking them as "most dangerous". The exhibit at the Bronx Zoo was reportedly still there in 1989.

In 1963 the curator of mammals at the Bronx Zoo was asked about visitors' reactions to the exhibit. He said, "They take it the way we want them to. It gets them to stop and think."

The original text under the exhibit read:

You are looking at the most dangerous animal in the world. It alone of all the animals that ever lived can exterminate (and has) entire species of animals. Now it has the power to wipe out all life on earth.

Sometime around the early 1970s, the text was changed to read:

This animal, increasing at a rate of 190,000 every 24 hours, is the only creature that has ever killed off entire species of other animals. Now it has the power to wipe out all life on earth.

== Reception ==
In 1963 the Corpus Christi Times called it a "startling exhibit" and said that it "stops visitors in their tracks". The Illustrated London News said what people saw in the mirror was "without a doubt, the most dangerous animal in the world". "And there is considerable truth in this simple, but effective statement that is made." In 1989, the exhibit was referred to as a guilt trip by The Morning Call of Allentown, Pennsylvania.

== Legacy ==
By 1968, Brookfield Zoo in Chicago had a similar display which read, "The most dangerous creature on earth is man, who destroys himself and has caused the extinction of over 100 species of animals." A version of the sign appears at the zoo featured in Yann Martel's 2001 novel Life of Pi.
