= Bronx Zoo =

Metropolitan zoo in the Bronx, New York

- Bronx Zoo logo

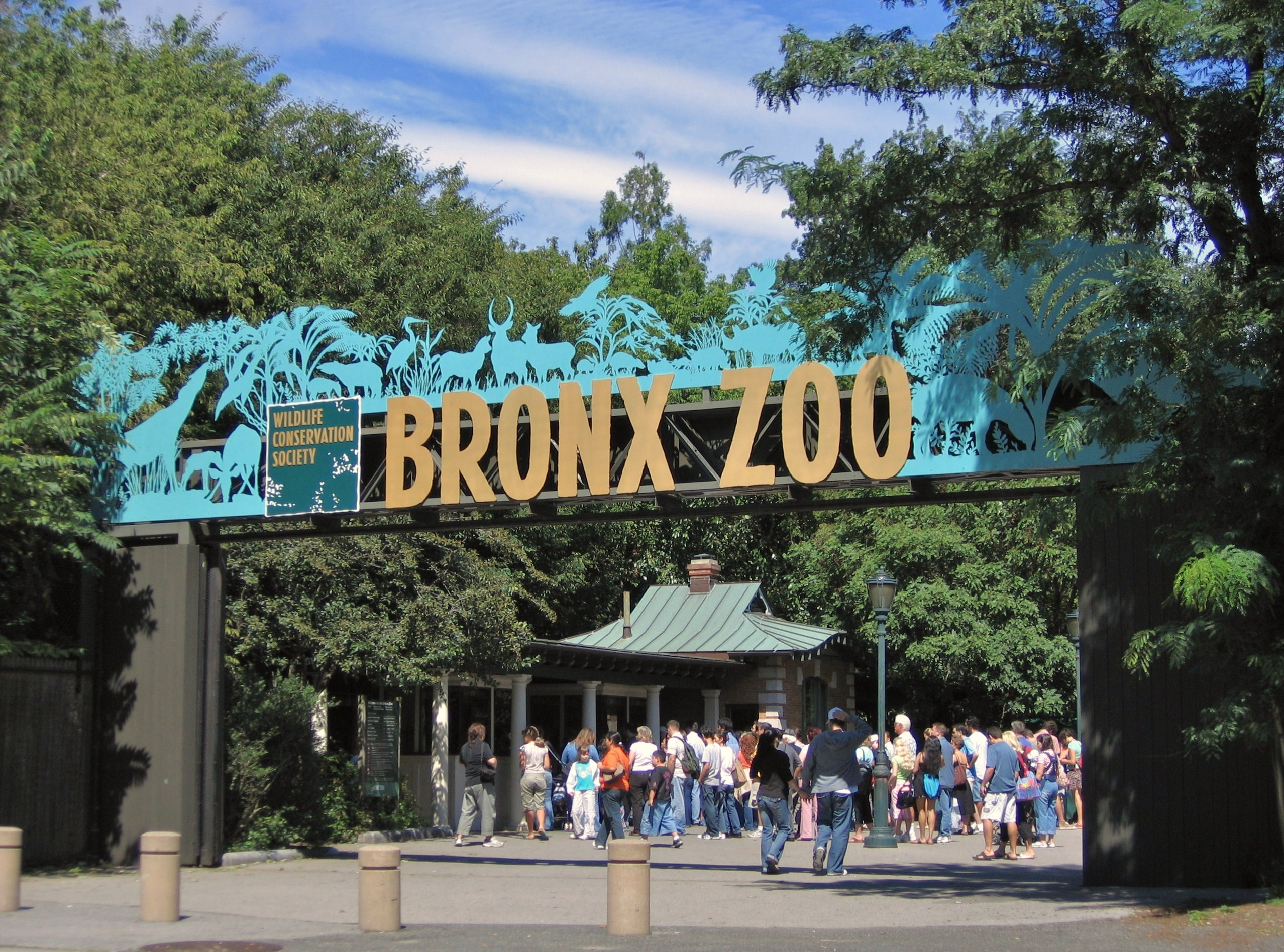
- Asia Gate Entrance
- Interactive map of Bronx Zoo
- 40°51′01″N 73°52′42″W
- Date opened: November 8, 1899
- Location: 2300 Southern Boulevard, Bronx Park, Bronx, New York 10460, U.S.
- Land area: 265 acres (107 ha)
- No. of animals: 4,000 (2010)
- No. of species: 650 (2010)
- Annual visitors: 2+ million
- Memberships: AZA
- Major exhibits: African Plains; Congo Gorilla Forest; JungleWorld; Madagascar!; Tiger Mountain; Wild Asia Monorail; World of Birds; World of Darkness; World of Reptiles; Zoo Center
- Management: Wildlife Conservation Society (WCS)
- Public transit: Subway: at West Farms Square–East Tremont Avenue; at East 180th Street; at Pelham Parkway; Bus: New York City Bus: Bx9, Bx12, Bx12 SBS, Bx17, Bx19, Bx21, Bx22, Bx36, Bx39, Bx40, Bx42, Q44 SBS; Bee-Line Bus: 60, 61, 62; Metro-North Railroad: Fordham
- Website: bronxzoo.com

The Bronx Zoo (also historically the Bronx Zoological Park and the Bronx Zoological Gardens) is a zoo within Bronx Park in the Bronx, New York City. It is one of the largest zoos in the United States by area and the largest metropolitan zoo, comprising 265 acres (107 ha) of park lands and naturalistic habitats separated by the Bronx River. The zoo has 2.1 million average yearly visitors as of 2009. The zoo's original buildings, known as Astor Court, were designed as a series of Beaux-Arts pavilions grouped around the large circular sea lion pool. The Rainey Memorial Gates were designed by sculptor Paul Manship in 1934 and listed on the National Register of Historic Places in 1972.

The zoo opened on November 8, 1899, featuring 843 animals in 22 exhibits. Its first director was William Temple Hornaday, who served for 30 years. From its inception the zoo has played a vital role in animal conservation. In 1905, the American Bison Society was created in an attempt to save the American bison, which had been depleted from tens-of-millions of animals to only a few hundred, from extinction. Two years later they were successfully reintroduced into the wild. In 2007, the zoo successfully reintroduced three Chinese alligators into the wild. The breeding was a milestone in the zoo's 10-year effort to reintroduce the species to the Yangtze River in China.

The Bronx Zoo is world-renowned for its large and diverse animal collection, and its award-winning exhibitions. The zoo is part of an integrated system of four zoos and one aquarium managed by the Wildlife Conservation Society (WCS), and it is accredited by the Association of Zoos and Aquariums (AZA).

== History ==
=== Early years ===
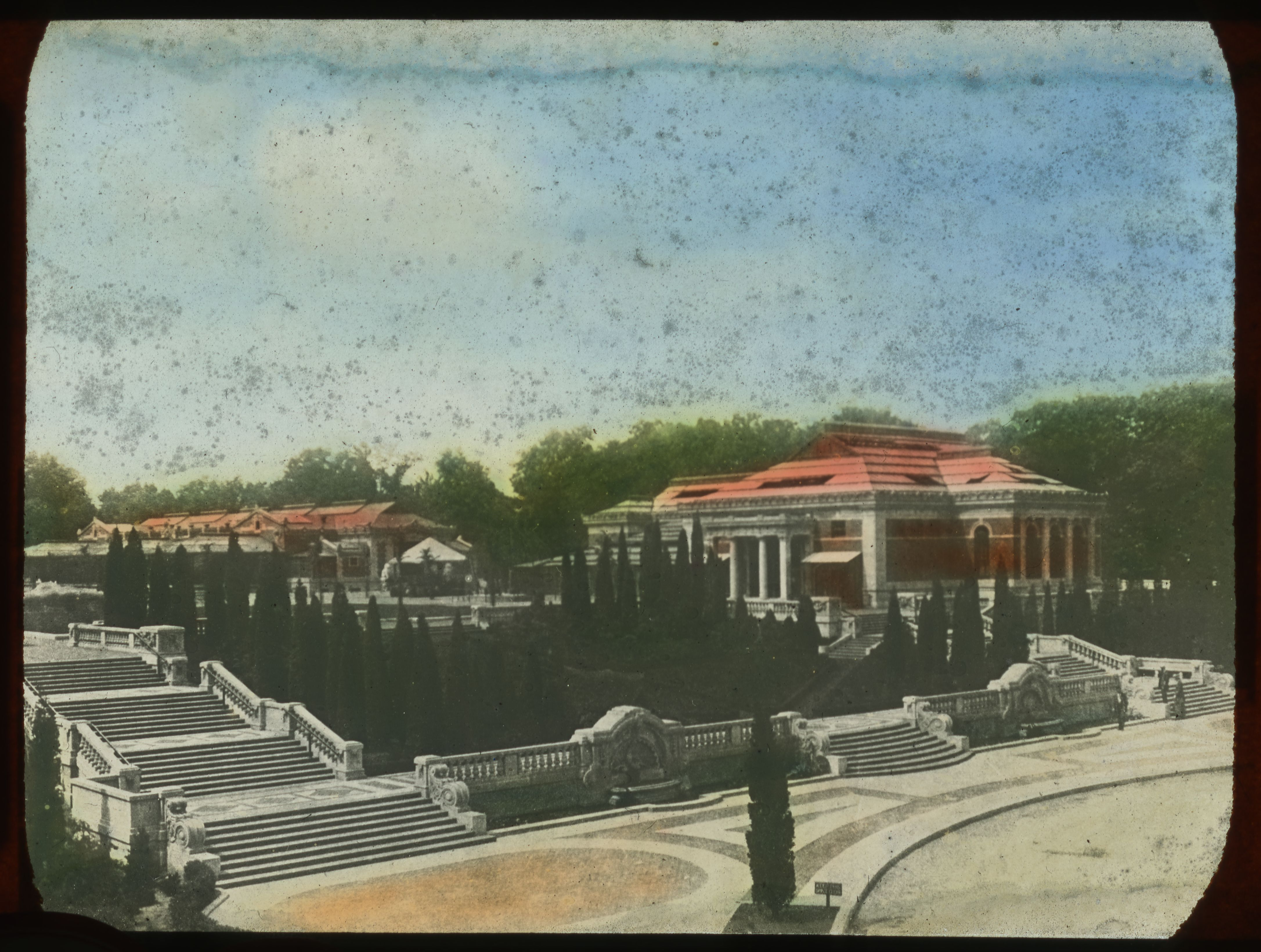
Bronx Zoological Park, 1913

In 1895, a group made up largely of members of the Boone and Crockett Club founded the New York Zoological Society (later renamed the Wildlife Conservation Society) for the purposes of founding a zoo, promoting the study of zoology, and preserving wildlife. Credit for this belonged chiefly to Club members Madison Grant and C. Grant LaFarge.

The zoo (sometimes called the Bronx Zoological Park and the Bronx Zoological Gardens) opened its doors to the public on November 8, 1899, featuring 843 animals in 22 exhibits. Its first director was William Temple Hornaday, who had 30 years of service at the zoo.

Heins & LaFarge designed the original permanent buildings, known as Astor Court, as a series of Beaux-Arts pavilions grouped around the large circular sea lion pool. In 1934, the Rainey Memorial Gates, designed by sculptor Paul Manship, were dedicated as a memorial to noted big game hunter Paul James Rainey. The gates were listed on the National Register of Historic Places in 1972.

The Rockefeller Fountain, which today adorns the gardens just inside the Fordham Road Gate, was once a landmark in Como, Italy. Originally built by Biagio Catella in 1872, it stood in the main square (Piazza Cavour) by the lakeside. Bought by William Rockefeller in 1902 for lire 3,500 (the estimated equivalent then of $637, and today of around $17,600), it was installed at the zoo in 1903. In 1968, the fountain was designated an official New York City landmark, and is one of the few local monuments to be honored in this way.

The New York Zoological Society's seal was designed by famed wildlife-artist Charles R. Knight. It depicted a ram's head and an eagle to reflect the society's interest in preserving North American wildlife. While no longer in use, the seal can still be found on the lawn in the center of Astor Court.

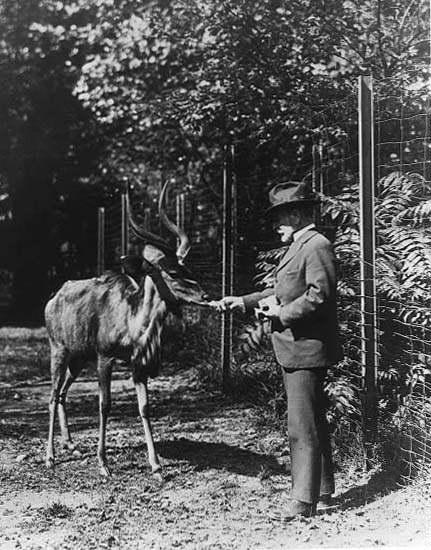
Zoo Director William T. Hornaday feeding a greater kudu in 1920

On December 17, 1902, the zoo became one of the seven zoos outside of Australia, and one of only two in the United States, to ever hold the now-extinct thylacine. The first was a male obtained from German animal dealer Carl Hagenbeck. It died on August 15, 1908. The zoo received a second male on January 26, 1912, from the Beaumaris Zoo in Tasmania, who later died on November 20 of that year. The zoo received its final two animals from Sydney animal dealer Ellis S. Joseph. The first was an unsexed individual who arrived on November 7, 1916, in poor condition and died seven days later. The second and final animal was a female purchased from the Beaumaris Zoo by Joseph for £25 (~$35) and then was resold to the zoo, arriving on July 14, 1917. On a visit, the director of the Melbourne Zoo, Mr. Le Souef, said upon seeing the animal:

I advise you to take excellent care of that specimen; for when it is gone, you never will get another. The species soon will be extinct.

The thylacine died on September 13, 1919.

In early 1903, the zoo was gifted a pair of Barbary lions, a subspecies which is extinct in the wild. The female was named Bedouin Maid and male Sultan, who went on to become one of the zoo's most popular animals. Displayed in the Lion House, Sultan was four years old at the time and described as being both "a perfect specimen" and "unusually good tempered". In May 1903, the pair produced three cubs, the first to be born at the zoo. On October 7, 1905, Charles R. Knight painted a portrait of Sultan and the animal went on to be the focus of many of the zoo's postcards. Sultan was also the model for the lion which sits atop the Rainey Memorial Gates.

In 1906, the Bronx Zoo put Ota Benga, a young Mbuti man from the Congo, on display along with monkeys and a bow and arrow. He was never returned home and later died of suicide at age 33.

In 1916, the zoo built the world's first animal hospital located at a zoo.

In 1926, the Bronx Zoo and the Smithsonian Institution's National Zoological Park simultaneously became the first in the country to exhibit shoebills.

The same year, W. Douglas Burden, F. J. Defosse, and Emmett Reid Dunn collected two live adult Komodo dragons—the first in America—for the zoo.

In 1937, the zoo became the first in North America to exhibit okapi.

=== Recent years ===
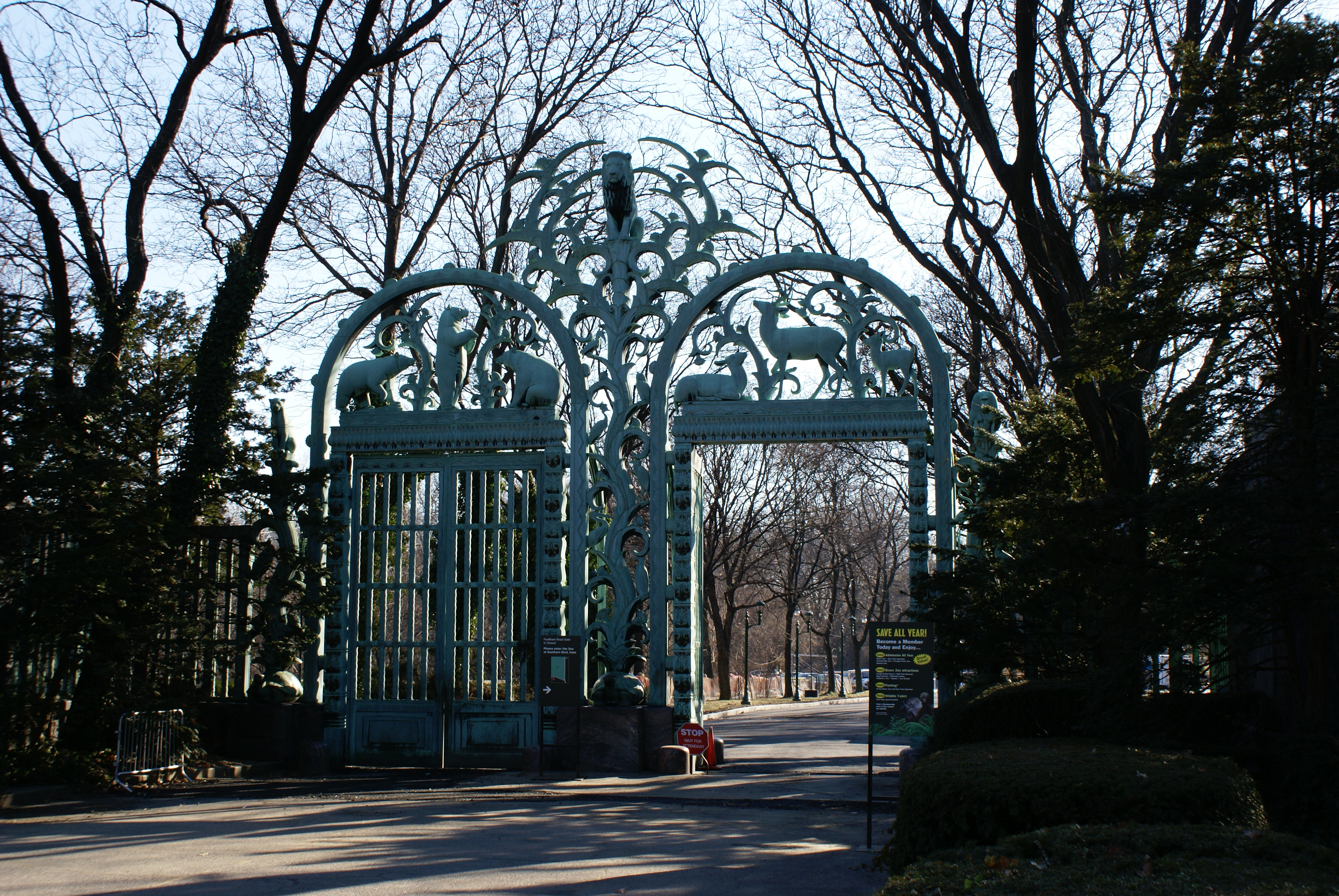
Historical Fordham Road Entrance to the Bronx Zoo featuring Rainey Memorial Gates

In 1960, the zoo became the first in the world to keep a James's flamingo, a species which had been thought to be extinct until 1957. They were imported along with the similar Andean flamingo.

The zoo was one of the few in the world to exhibit proboscis monkeys outside of Southeast Asia and, in the 1976 International Zoo Yearbook, the zoo reported having eight monkeys, seven of which were born at the zoo. As of March 1999, it only had two monkeys left, these two being the last members of their species kept in the United States. In 2003, the pair were sent to the Singapore Zoo.

On June 6, 1990, the zoo received a female Sumatran rhinoceros named Rapunzel. At the time, the zoo was one of only three in North America to hold the critically endangered species, with the Cincinnati and San Diego Zoos being the others, holding one female each. The three institutions were a part of the Sumatran Rhino Trust's plan to start a captive breeding program for the species. Rapunzel was born in the wild in Sumatra and rescued from an area of rainforest that was slated to be cleared for a palm oil plantation in 1989. Though it's believed she bred in the wild, she never produced any calves in captivity. It was eventually determined that she was past reproductive age, at which point she was returned to the zoo in 2000, having been brought out for breeding purposes. She lived in the Zoo Center until her death in December 2005 in her 30s.

In November 2006, the zoo opened up brand-new eco-friendly restrooms outside the Bronx River Gate. According to Clivus Multrum, which built the composting toilets chosen by the zoo, these facilities can serve 500,000 people and save 1,000,000 U.S. gal (3,800,000 L) of water a year.

In March 2007, the Wildlife Conservation Society and the Fordham University Graduate School of Education announced they would offer a joint program leading to a Master of Science degree in education and New York State initial teacher certification in adolescent science education (biology, grades 7–12). The program began the next year, and is the first joint degree program of its kind.

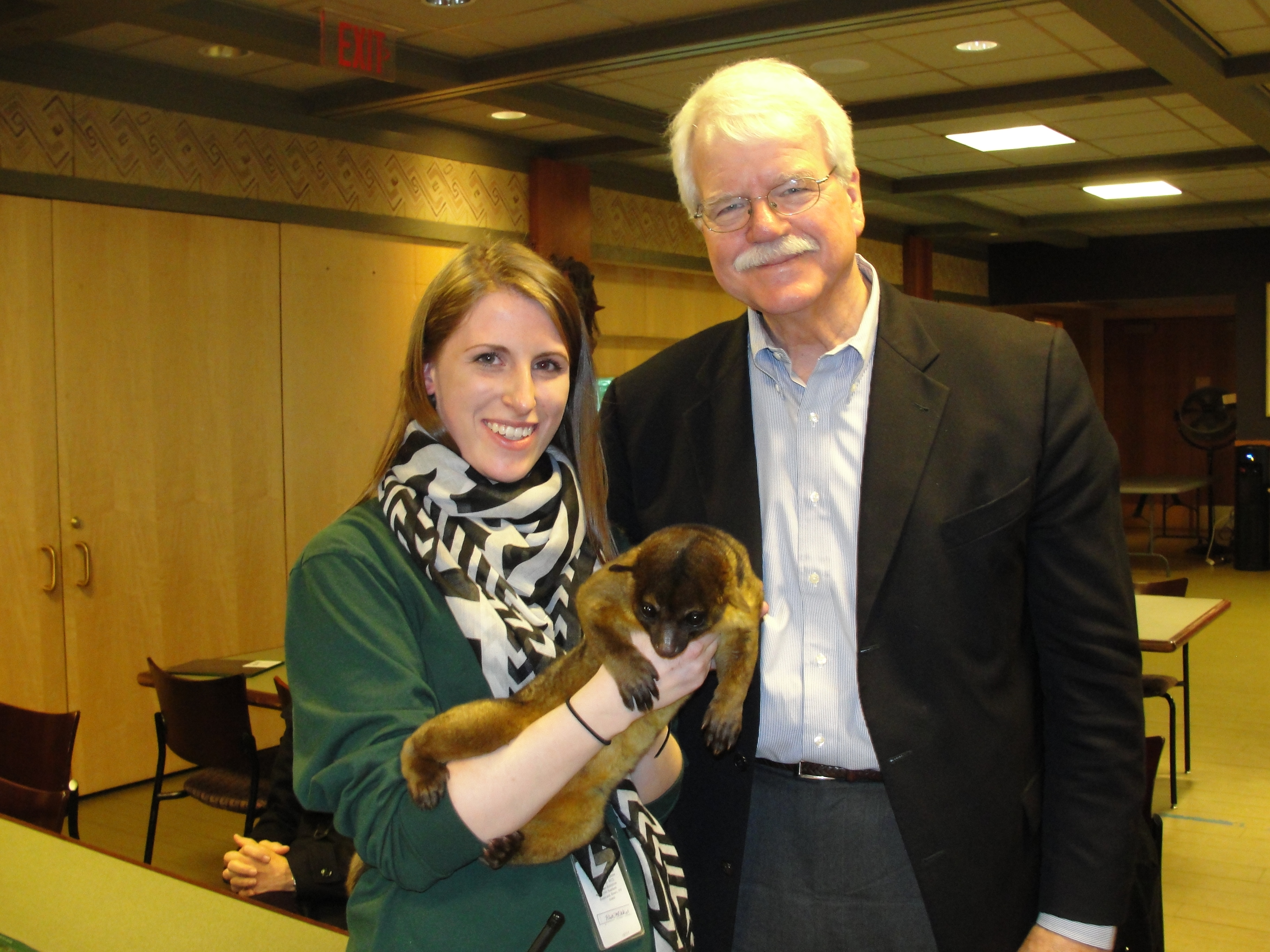
Congressman George Miller with Bronx Zoo Education Instructor Kate Ma, 2011

In 2009, New York City cut funding for the state's 76 zoos, aquariums, and botanical gardens. The Wildlife Conservation Society as a whole suffered a $15-million deficit, and the zoo was forced to downsize its staff and animal collection. The budget cuts forced the buyouts of over 100 employees and layoffs of dozens more as well as the closure of four sections of the zoo: World of Darkness, Rare Animal Range, the Skyfari, and a small section of the overall still-open African Plains exhibit which featured endangered antelope. In the end, 186 staff positions (15%) were cut within the WCS. In 2012, Mayor Michael Bloomberg passed another budget cut that took $4.7-million from the funding of the zoo and the New York Aquarium, also run by the WCS. This cut represented more than half of what the collections were receiving. However, Bloomberg also passed an energy subsidy that brought the cuts down to $3.7-million.

In the summer of 2014, New York Representative Carolyn B. Maloney visited the Chengdu Panda Base in Sichuan, China and announced her plan to bring giant pandas to New York City. Initially, she aimed to exhibit them at the Central Park Zoo, though switched her attention to the Bronx after deciding the 6.5-acre zoo didn't have the resources to care for the animals. Maloney and her supporters, which included Maurice R. Greenberg, Newt Gingrich, and John A. Catsimatidis, were met with many obstacles throughout their campaign. Initially, the largest issues were the lack of support from Mayor Bill de Blasio and City Hall, and Chinese officials insisting that no more pandas be brought to the United States. However, in October 2015, Chinese Ambassador Cui Tiankai announced that his country was willing to enter preliminary talks with the city over the matter, and soon after de Blasio and City Hall signed a letter appealing to Chinese officials, drafted by Maloney in 2014. Despite her efforts, Maloney's campaign still has yet to overcome two critical steps in acquiring pandas: funding and the zoo's consent. Both de Blasio and the Wildlife Conservation Society refuse to fund the project, not wanting taxpayer or vital zoo money to go towards the highly expensive project. David Towne, chairman of the American-based Giant Panda Conservation Foundation, estimated that the cost of bringing pandas to the city would be around $50 million.

The foundation has also said that the cost of keeping just one such animal is about $1 million a year, including food, trainers, and habitat upkeep. Additionally, China loans out their pandas for a hefty fee. A study published by The Washington Post in 2005 found that the four U.S. zoos holding pandas—the Memphis Zoo, the San Diego Zoo, the National Zoological Park (located in Washington, D.C., and Front Royal, Virginia) and Zoo Atlanta—had spent $33 million more on their animals than revenue made off of them between 2000 and 2003. Despite the figures, Maloney believes pandas in her city will do better since the city has a higher population than those four cities combined, and received a record-breaking 56.4-million visitors in 2014. Still, the WCS continues to steer away from bringing in these pandas. In 2014, a senior official from the WCS said Maloney's campaign had reached "a new level of absurdity" when it was announced she intended to bring a Chinese delegation to the Central Park Zoo. In November 2015, Jim Breheny, WCS Executive Vice President and Bronx Zoo Director, released a statement saying:

The concept of bringing Giant Pandas to New York which the Congresswoman is proposing is complex and would require that a number of complicated issues be considered and resolved before any such plan could be implemented.

Any decision to bring giant pandas to New York would need to be based on positively contributing to the conservation of giant pandas in the wild and a determination that all the requirements necessary to keep the animals well in New York could be met.

Very importantly, there is no funding for this initiative. Building and maintenance of such a exhibit would be an ongoing effort that would require tens of millions of dollars up front and annual support monies for pandas for however long they would be in the city. Any agreement to exhibit pandas would have to come with a guarantee of provision for the necessary funds.

== Exhibits and attractions ==
The zoo has two types of displays: free exhibits accessible with a Limited Admission ticket, and premium exhibits which require a full Bronx Zoo admission ticket or additional fees.

=== Free exhibits and attractions ===
- African Plains
- Aquatic Bird House and Sea Bird Aviary
- Big Bears
- Birds of Prey
- Bison Range
- Carter Giraffe Building
- Gelada Reserve
- Himalayan Highlands
- Madagascar!
- Mitsubishi Riverwalk
- Mouse House
- Northern Ponds
- Pheasant Aviary
- Sea Lion Pool
- Tiger Mountain
- World of Birds
- World of Darkness
- World of Reptiles
- Zoo Center

As of 2010, the Bronx Zoo is home to more than 4,000 animals of 650 species, many of which are endangered or threatened. Some of its exhibits, such as World of Birds and World of Reptiles, are arranged by taxonomy, while others, such as African Plains and the Wild Asian Monorail, are arranged geographically. The zoo also has Indian peafowl that roam freely.

==== Astor Court ====
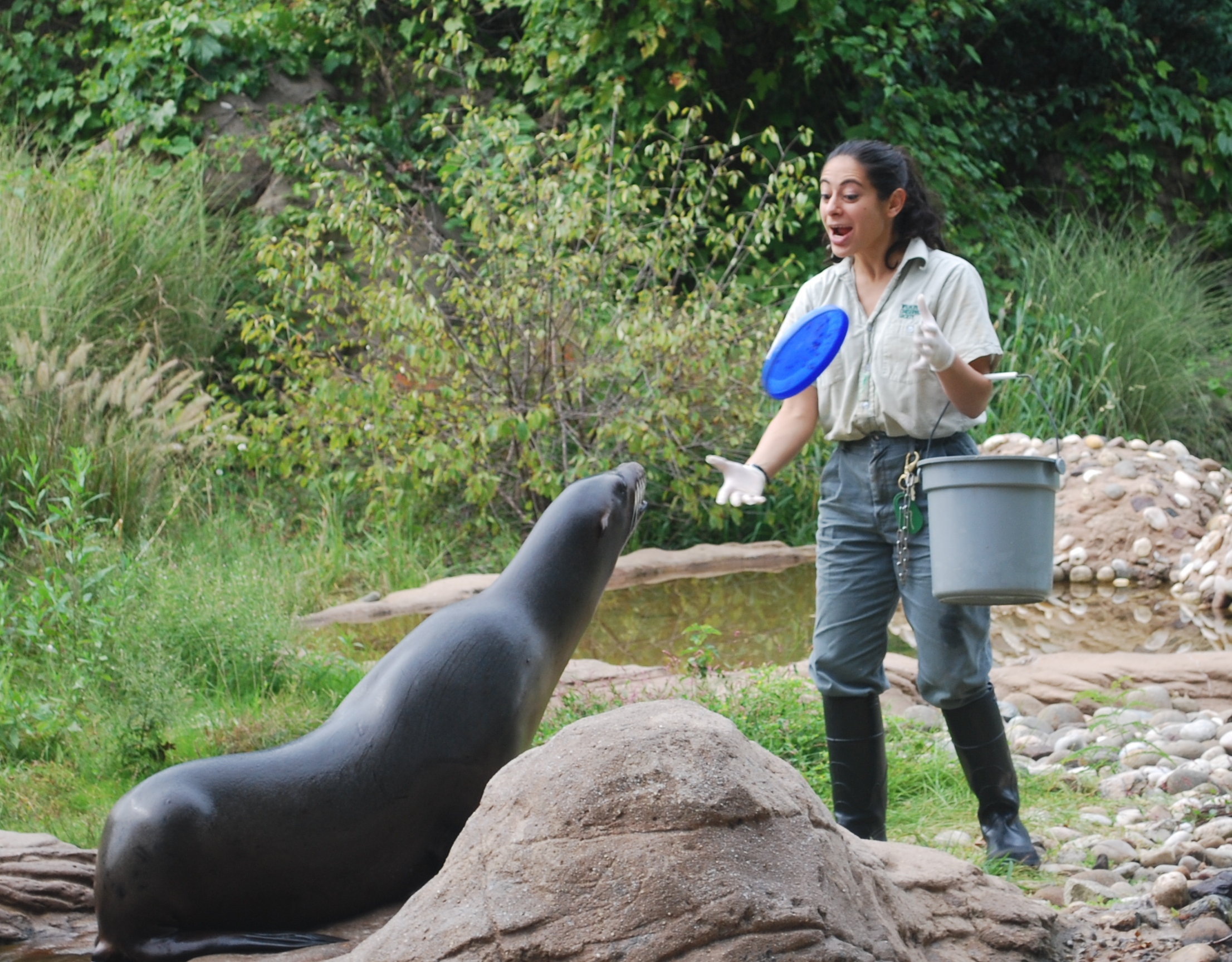
California sea lion (Zalophus californianus) with trainer

Astor Court is an old section of the zoo that is home to many of the zoo's original buildings, designed by Heins & LaFarge. While most of the buildings are closed to the public, the former Lion House was reopened as the "Madagascar!" exhibit in 2008, and the Zoo Center still exhibits various species. Astor Court includes the historic sea lion pool featuring California sea lions. Small aviaries featuring small bird species can be found nearby and white-headed capuchins can be seen behind the old Monkey House.

The New York City Landmarks Preservation Commission designated Astor Court's buildings as a city landmark in 2000, after a failed attempt to do so in 1966.

==== African Plains ====
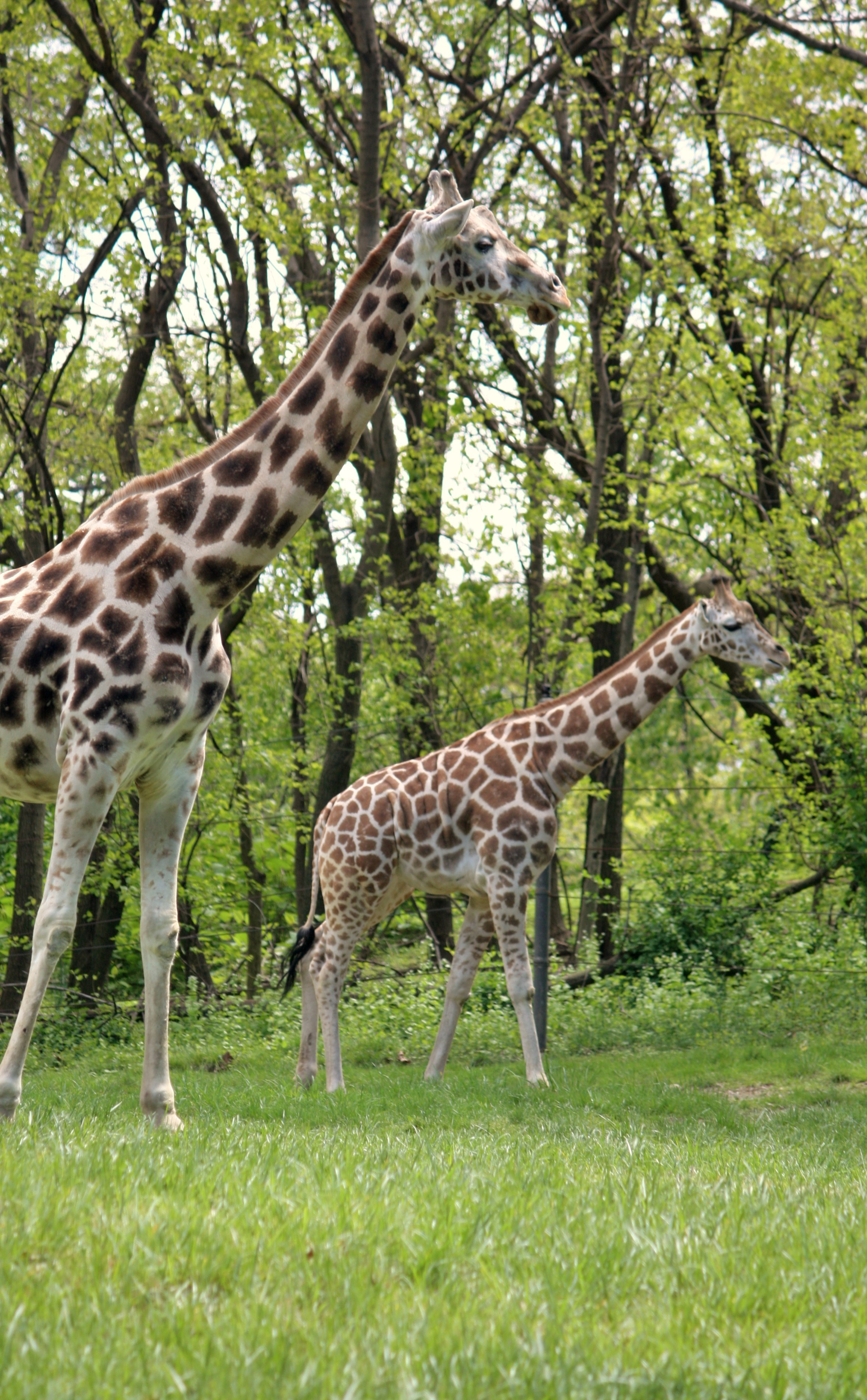
Giraffes (Giraffa camelopardalis) at the zoo

African Plains allows visitors to walk past lions, African wild dogs, Grévy's zebras, and spotted hyenas, and see herds of nyalas, Thomson's gazelles, lesser kudus, and slender-horned gazelles, It also includes hybrid giraffes (Baringo × reticulated giraffe) sharing their home with common ostriches. The exhibit originally opened in 1941 and was the first in the country to allow visitors to view predators and their prey in a naturalistic setting as well as allowing large predators such as lions to be exhibited cage-free. This success was achieved through the creation of a series of deep moats, a set-up which can still be found at the zoo today. The wild dogs, however, can be viewed close-up from a glass-fronted viewing pavilion. The zoo has bred their lions on multiple occasions, including one male and two females born in January 2010 and three males and one female born in August 2013. The zoo, in partnership with the New York Daily News, held a contest to name the 2010 cubs, which made their public debut in April 2010. The winning names were Shani, Nala, and Adamma. The 2013 cubs were named Thulani, Ime, Bahata, and Amara and the three males can still be found on-exhibit at the zoo.

The Carter Giraffe Building, a section of African Plains, features indoor/outdoor viewing of the zoo's giraffes and South African ostriches, and is also home to common dwarf mongooses, Von der Decken's hornbills, and northern white-faced owls. In June 2009, two aardvarks imported from Tanzania joined the exhibit. In September 2010, the pair gave birth to a male named Hoover, the first to ever be born at the zoo.

Until 2009, the southwestern corner of African Plains was home to the endangered Arabian oryx and blesbok. Due to budget cuts and the unpopularity of the species with visitors, they were phased-out of the collection. This section of the exhibit is replaced by the Nature Trek. In 2017 they received two baby cheetahs from the San Diego Zoo. Cheetahs are now part of their animal encounter programs. They were replaced by the hyenas.

==== Big Bears ====
Big Bears features four bears, a male grizzly bear and three ABC Islands bears rescued as orphans from Baranof Island of Alaska.

Until 2015, two female grizzly bears named Betty and Veronica also lived in this exhibit, but moved to the Central Park Zoo where they died in 2020 and 2021.

The zoo also formerly housed polar bears until the last individual, a 26-year-old male named Tundra died in December 2017. Three dholes from the San Diego Zoo Safari Park were added to the habitat in 2019.

==== Gelada Reserve ====
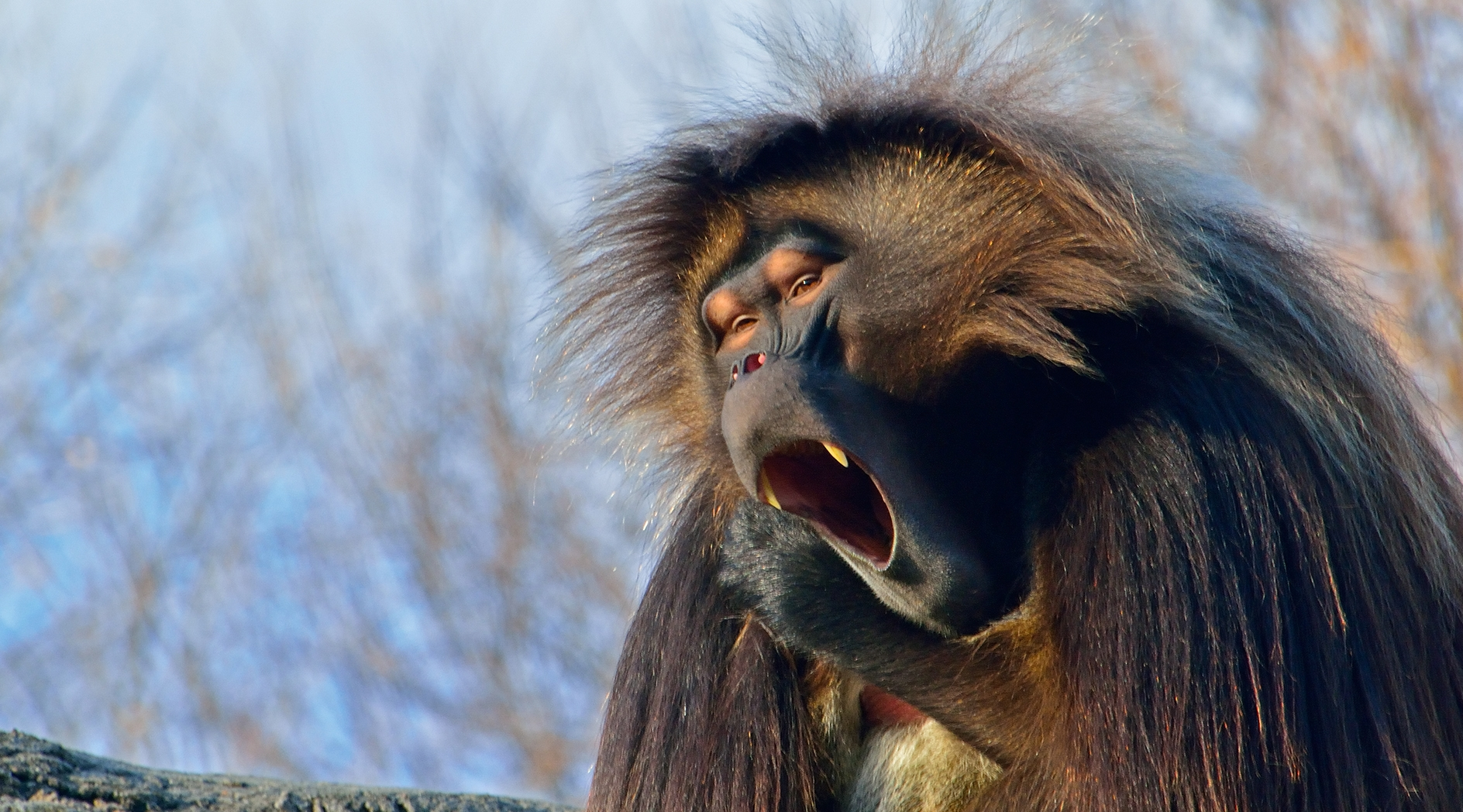
Gelada in the reserve

Gelada Reserve, originally called Baboon Reserve, opened in 1990. It is a two-acre recreation of the Ethiopian Highlands which, at the time of its opening, was the largest primate exhibit in the United States. The exhibit's main features revolve around the zoo's troop of geladas such as artificial rocks and earthbanks, and displays about life in the highlands and the side-by-side evolution of humans and geladas. Visitors can watch the geladas from multiple viewpoints along with Nubian ibex and rock hyrax, all of which are mixed together in the hilly enclosure. An African village-styled café overlooks the exhibit. Baboon Reserve won the AZA Exhibit Award in 1991. In the fall of 2014, a male gelada was born at the zoo, the first in over 13 years, and was the only zoo in the US to display them until the San Diego Zoo in 2017 received their gelada troop for their Africa Rocks exhibit.

Before the late 1980s, this place replaced a lawn of aoudads.

==== Himalayan Highlands ====
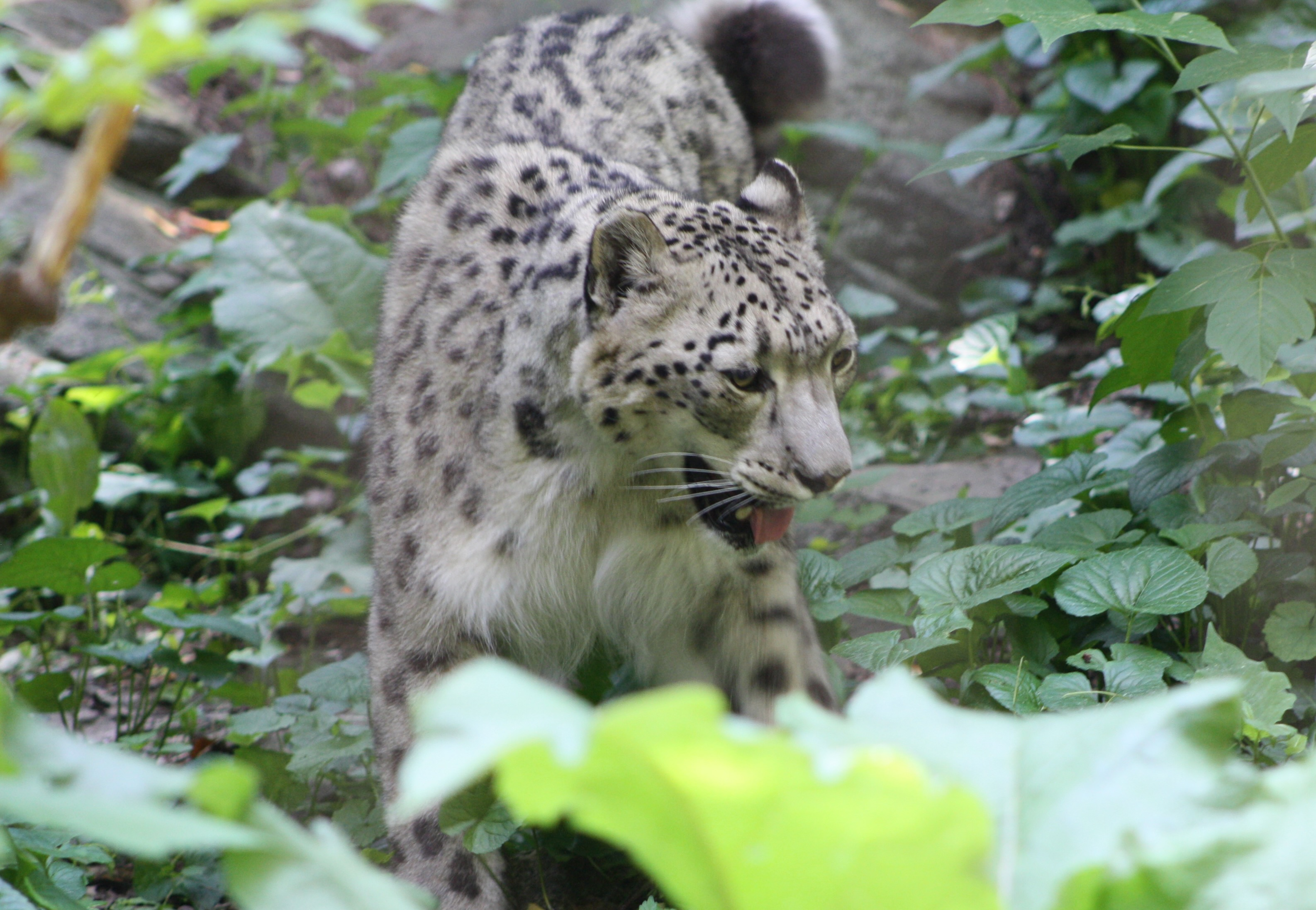
Snow leopard in the Himalayan Highlands exhibit

Himalayan Highlands, which opened on June 27, 1986, recreates the Himalayas region of Asia. The exhibit is known for its highly naturalistic look and use of the hilly and rocky terrain found in that portion of the zoo. The stars of the exhibit are the zoo's multiple snow leopards. The exhibit also is home to red pandas and white-naped cranes. In 2006, the zoo brought in a male snow leopard named Leo from Pakistan after he was orphaned at around two months old. Leo sired a male cub on April 9, 2013. The cub is one of more than 70 snow leopards born at the zoo, which was the first U.S. zoo to exhibit the species in 1903. Leo later became a grandfather when his son sired a female cub in 2017. On May 31, 2026, snow leopards Dariga and Moutig gave birth to a new cub, Sarka. After passing her physical exams and taking her routine vaccinations. She was introduced to Himalayan Highlands habitat at just 4 months old. Snow leopards are among the most elusive big cats in the world. With only about 5,000 to 7,000 left in the wild, classifying them as vulnerable. 600 live in zoos around the world. The zoo takes part in the Association of Zoos and Aquariums Snow Leopard Species Survival Plan. A program that focuses on keeping species healthy.

==== Madagascar! ====
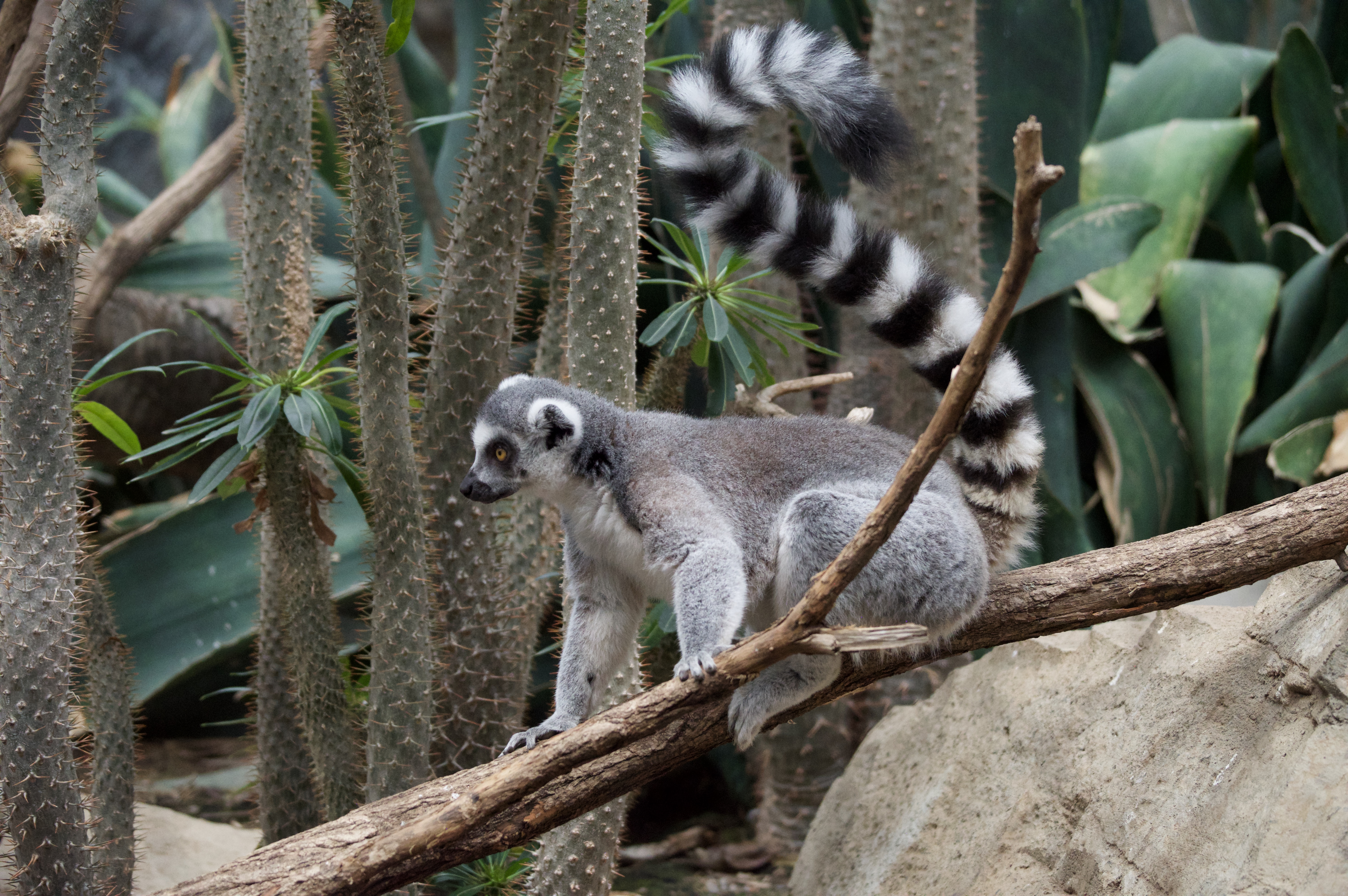
Lemur at the zoo

Madagascar!, which opened on June 20, 2008, recreates various habitats found on the island of Madagascar and contains a variety of wildlife from the island, including lemurs, fossas, Nile crocodiles, radiated tortoises, lesser vasa parrots, panther chameleons, and highly endangered cichlids. Ring-tailed lemurs, collared lemurs, red ruffed lemurs, crowned lemurs, and Coquerel's sifakas are the lemur species held in the exhibit. Madagascar! holds the first two ring-tailed mongoose in the United States and is home to over 100,000 Madagascar hissing cockroaches that can be named for $10 around Valentine's Day. The exhibit has multiple educational displays focusing on the many threats to the survival of these species as well as the WCS's conservation work in Madagascar. The building was converted from the former Lion House, which had opened in 1903 and closed by the late 1980s. The exhibit also has tomato frogs and Henkel's leaf-tailed geckos.

==== Mouse House ====
The Mouse House is a small building home to various species of small mammals, particularly rodents. The building features both diurnal and nocturnal areas and a row of outdoor cages which, during the summer months, are home to a variety of small primates, many of which are former monkey house inhabitants. Species include black and rufous elephant shrews, eastern spiny mice, harvest mice, common degus, African pouched rats, northern Luzon giant cloud rats, lesser hedgehog tenrecs, Damaraland mole-rats, northern treeshrews, long-tailed chinchillas, and feathertail gliders.

==== Aquatic Bird House ====
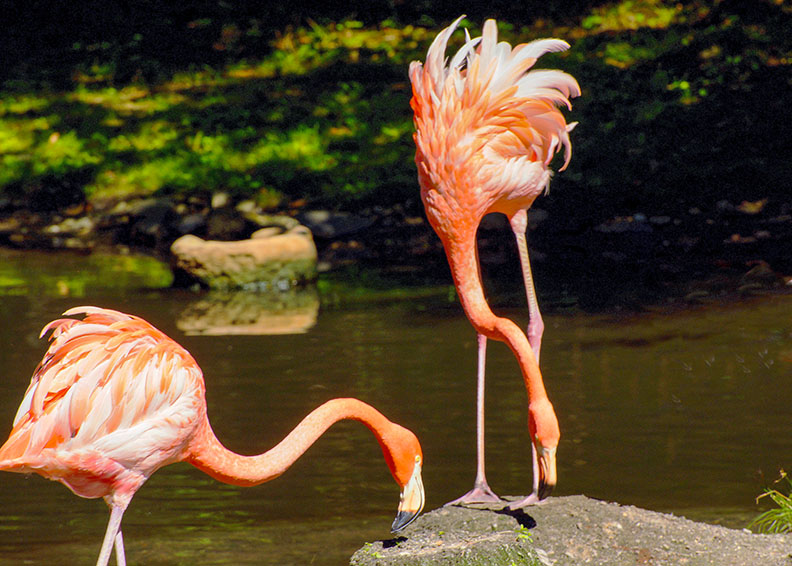
American flamingos (Phoenicopterus ruber) in the pond

The current Aquatic Bird House opened on September 24, 1964, on the foundation of the original house, which was opened on November 8, 1899, with the rest of the zoo. The building features a multitude of mostly open-fronted enclosures mainly focusing on coastal and wetland habitats and the species that rely on them. Scarlet ibises, roseate spoonbills, anhingas, boat-billed herons and Madagascar crested ibises are among the residents here. The exhibit also features an outdoor pond home to a flock of American flamingos and a large aviary home for lesser adjutant storks.

The zoo is one of only three zoos in North America working with the endangered storks and has bred them several times, including the hatching of two chicks on June 27 and August 15, 2015. The Aquatic Bird House is also home to another endangered stork species: the Storm's stork. The zoo is one of only two in the United States working with this species; the other being the San Diego Zoo. In May 2014, the zoo opened a new nocturnal enclosure for a North Island brown kiwi in the building, and in May 2015, a colony of Australian little penguins from the Taronga Zoo were added.

==== Russell B. Aitken Sea Bird Aviary ====
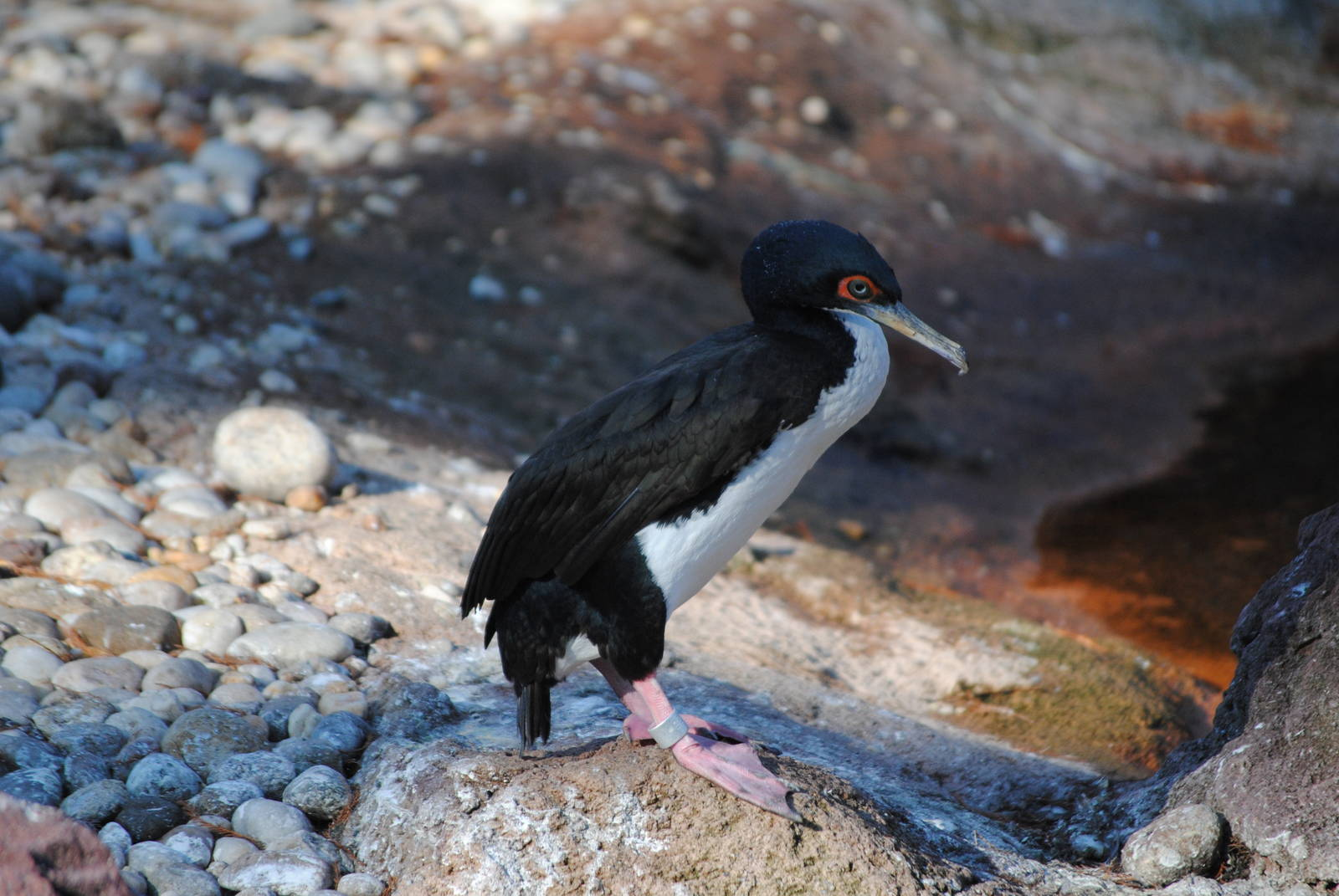
A guanay cormorant in the Sea Bird Aviary: The zoo is the last to hold the species outside of South America.

The Russell B. Aitken Sea Bird Aviary, which opened on May 17, 1997, is a huge walk-through aviary designed to resemble the Patagonian coast. The aviary stands at 60-feet high, occupies 615,000 cubic feet, is supported by five steel arches, and netted with a stainless steel mesh. The aviary was built to replace the original De Jur Aviary that opened with the zoo in 1899 and collapsed in a snowstorm in February 1995. The exhibit's height and open space allows the residents to soar around above visitor's heads and the fake sea cliff walls allows for more natural nesting and roosting behavior. The aviary is home to about 100 birds, most being Inca terns, but also a small colony of Magellanic penguins, grey gulls, and brown pelicans. The aviary was also home to the last guanay cormorant in captivity outside of South America. In April 2014, four Peruvian pelicans were added to the exhibit, and in January 2015, a pair of ruddy-headed geese were added.

==== Tiger Mountain ====
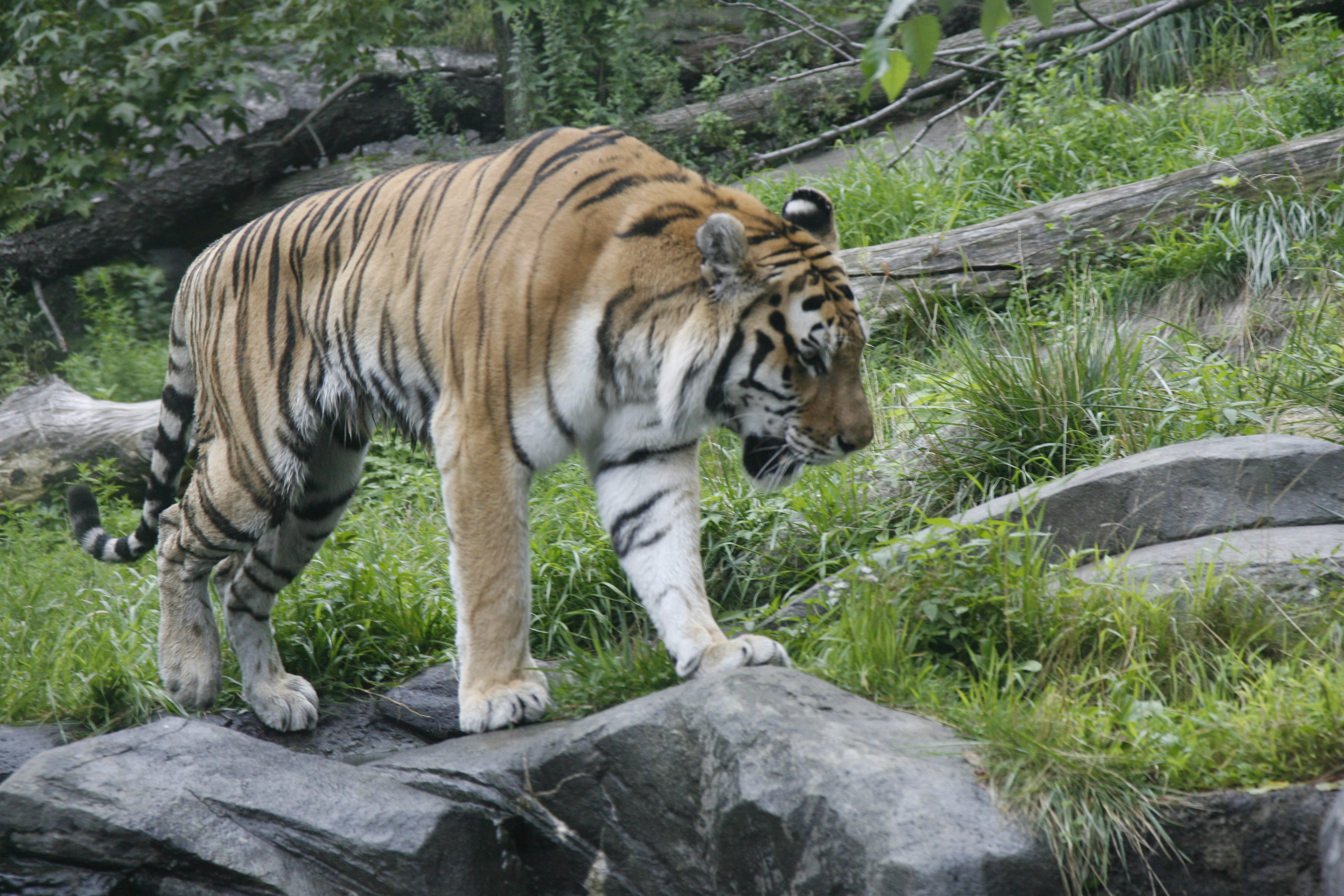
A male Siberian tiger at the zoo

Tiger Mountain, which opened on May 15, 2003, is a three-acre exhibit which features Amur tigers and occasionally Malayan tigers, who are usually kept off-exhibit. The exhibit has two enclosures with glass viewing, the second of which has a 10,000 gallon pool with underwater viewing. Outside of the tigers, the exhibit has multiple interactive displays designed to educate visitors on behavioral enrichment and on the zoo's/WCS' ex-situ and in-situ conservation.

The exhibit won the AZA Exhibit Award in 2004. The zoo has had good breeding successful with both subspecies of tiger, having bred both in 2010. Another set of Siberian tiger cubs were born in 2012, and a pair of Malayan tiger cubs were born in 2016. One of the tiger cubs named Nadia tested positive for COVID-19 during the COVID-19 pandemic in New York City, but have since recovered from the disease. Across from the entrance to Tiger Mountain, a large herd of Père David's deer and a pair of whooper swans can be found.

Before 2003, this part of the area was once Wolf Wood, and includes a pack of wolves.

==== World of Birds ====
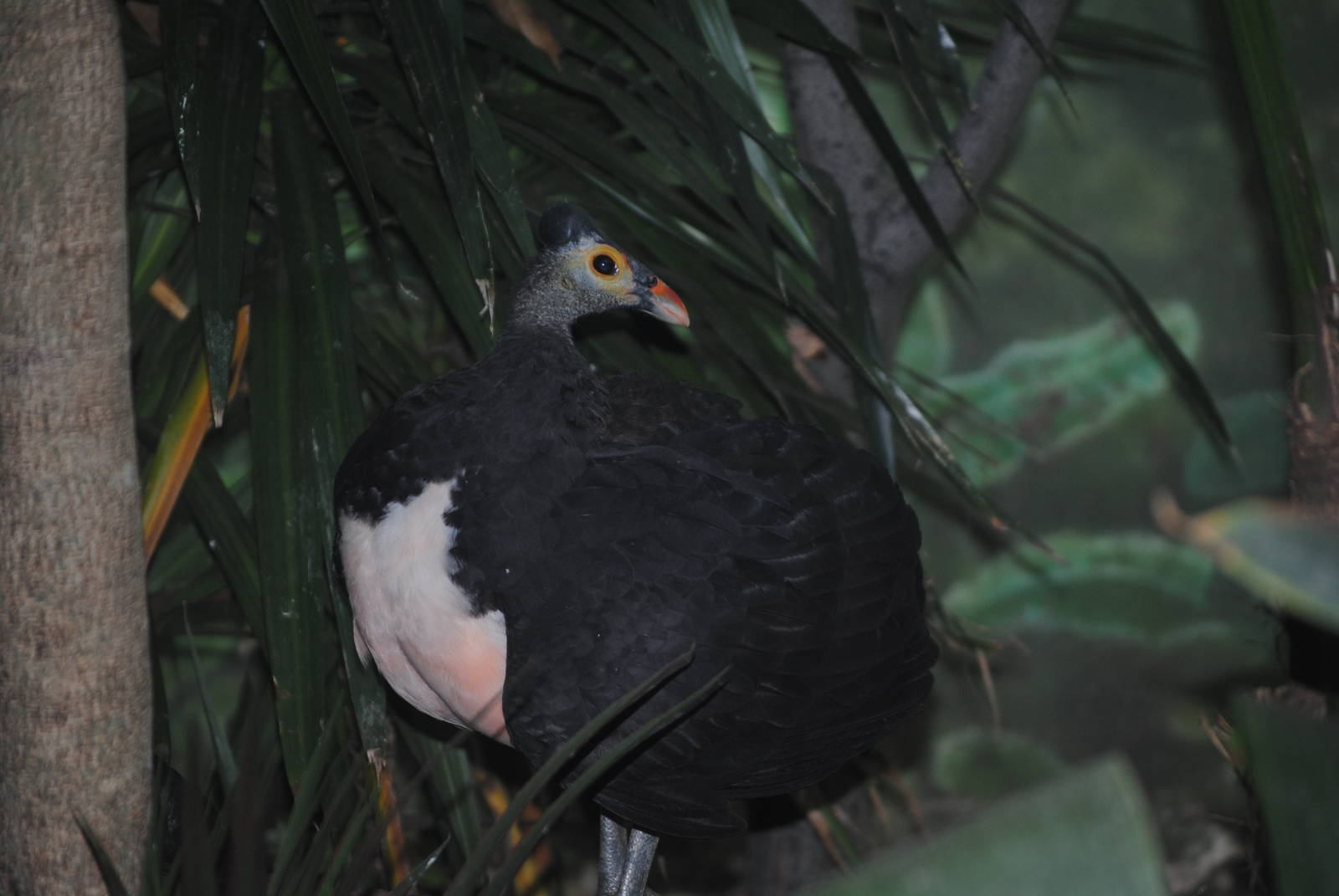
Maleo

World of Birds, which originally opened in 1972, is an indoor bird house spanning two floors and featuring several walk-through aviaries. The building closed for repairs and upgrades in the summer of 2010, and reopened the following year. The exhibit has multiple educational displays focusing on deforestation and the illegal wildlife trade and their affects on wild bird populations. The most prominent residents of the exhibit include the maleos, great hornbills, knobbed hornbills, Andean cock-of-the-rocks, Nicobar pigeons, southern bald ibises, great argus pheasants, ocellated turkeys, hyacinth macaws, grey parrots, grey-winged trumpeters, lesser birds-of-paradise and white-throated bee-eaters. Some mammals like Bolivian gray titis and greater mouse deer also live here. Emus can be found in an outdoor yard. In mid-2009, the zoo's hand-reared pair of great blue turacos successfully raised chicks, the first known instance of a hand-reared pair doing so. In March 2013, three maleo chicks hatched at the zoo, bringing their total number of birds to 12. The zoo, along with the WCS, works toward preserving this species in the wild as well.

==== World of Darkness ====
World of Darkness opened in 1969 and was the world's first major exhibit designed specifically to introduce the public to nocturnal animals such as aye-ayes, naked mole-rats, common vampire bats, Seba's short-tailed bats, ringtails, gray mouse lemurs, red-rumped agoutis, Egyptian fruit bats, broad-snouted caimans, fat-tailed dwarf lemurs, blood pythons, Mohol bushbabies, northern Luzon giant cloud rats, Hoffman's two-toed sloths, nine-banded armadillos, pygmy slow lorises, dourocoulis, sand cats, Guatemalan beaded lizards, Timor pythons, New Caledonian giant geckos, Texas blind salamanders, blind cave fish, emperor scorpions, and pinktoe tarantulas. Built by Morris Ketchum Jr. & Associates, the house was built where the zoo's Rocking Stone Restaurant stood until 1942. The exhibit used red-lights to dimly illuminate the enclosures within the windowless building. Like all nocturnal exhibits, the house ran on a reversed lighting schedule, which simulated night and day at opposite times to allow visitors to view nocturnal animals in a more naturalistic setting. Due to budget cuts and the high cost of running the exhibit, it was closed in 2009. On November 28, 2024, during the 98th Macy's Thanksgiving Day Parade, the zoo ran a float that hinted at the return of the exhibit. This was later confirmed on December 4 when the zoo announced that the exhibit reopened on July 12, 2025. The exhibit used to have species including leopard cats, Rodrigues flying foxes, bay duikers, African brush-tailed porcupines, spotted skunks, rock cavies, common genets, Pallas's long-tongued bats, Jamaican fruit bats, lesser spear-nosed bats, short-tailed bats, sand boas, and marine toads until 2009.

==== World of Reptiles ====
World of Reptiles has been an attraction at the zoo since it first opened. The building's first curator was Raymond Lee Ditmars, who had kept 45 snakes in his attic before being hired at the zoo. The exhibit is a long hall with various terrariums situated on both sides. The exhibit also features a nursery area, which exhibits newborn herptiles born at the zoo, as well as a window into the off-show breeding and caring facilities. In the building, the zoo breeds and exhibits a wide range of species, including Chinese alligators, blue iguanas, Cuban crocodiles, false gharials, dyeing poison dart frogs, eyelash vipers, Fly River turtles, giant musk turtles, green anacondas, hellbenders, Milos viper, king cobras and Philippine sailfin lizards. The building also is home to the zoo's breeding population of Kihansi spray toads, which the zoo saved from extinction. On March 25, 2011, an Egyptian cobra escaped from its off-show enclosure, during which time the exhibit was closed to the public. Six days later, the animal was found elsewhere in the building. The zoo named the cobra MIA (Missing In Action) and placed it on exhibit.

==== Pheasant Aviary ====
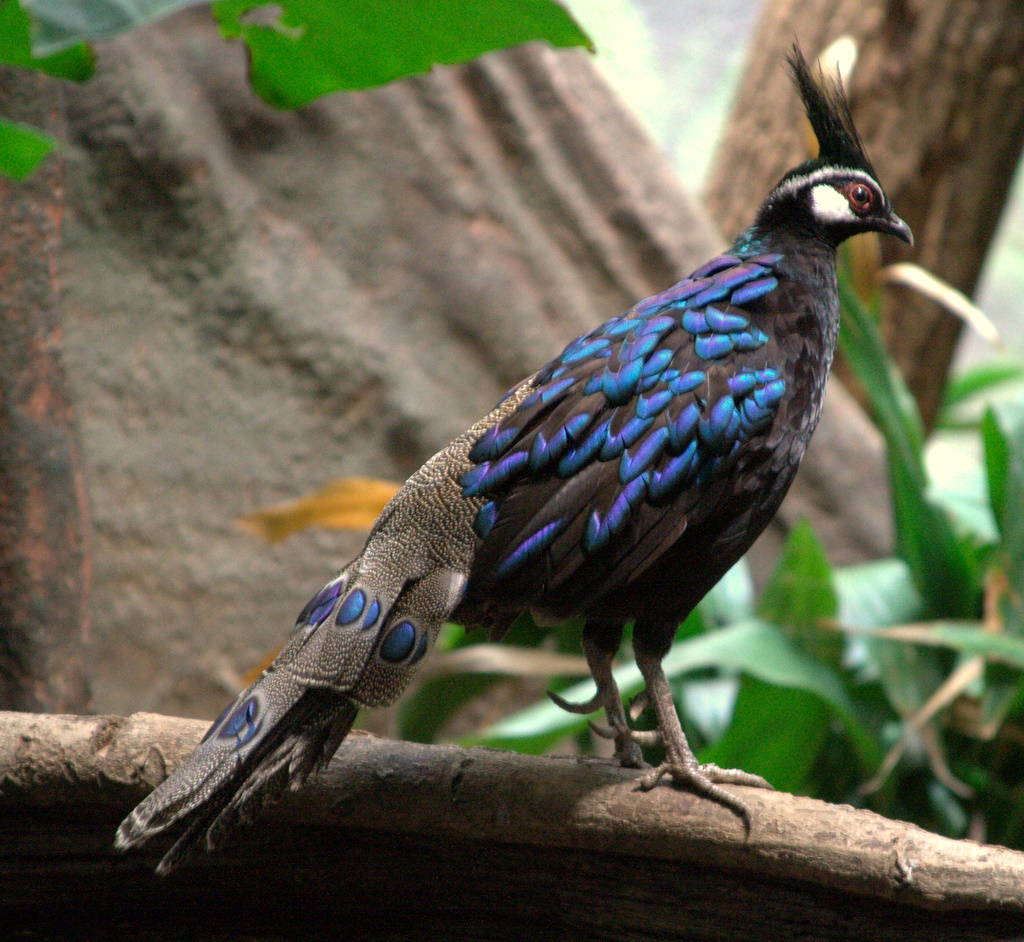
Male Palawan peacock-pheasant (Polyplectron napoleonis) at the aviary

The Pheasant Aviary is a long row of cages home to a large variety of bird species, particularly pheasants. Exhibited species include Elliot's pheasant, Lady Amherst's pheasant, Cabot's tragopan, blue eared-pheasant, mountain peacock-pheasant, Mérida helmeted curassow, Swinhoe's pheasant, Java peafowl, eastern loggerhead shrike (Lanius ludovicianus migrans), white-throated ground-dove, Lord Derby's parakeet, Montezuma oropendola and yellow-crested cockatoo.

==== Birds of Prey ====
Birds of Prey is a row of cages for multiple raptor species. The exhibit is home to bald eagles, golden eagles, turkey vultures, snowy owls, Andean condors, palm nut vultures and king vultures. In February 2011, the zoo received two bald eagles rescued in Wyoming. Nearby is a small pond for black-necked swans, American white pelicans and brown pelicans.

==== Zoo Center ====
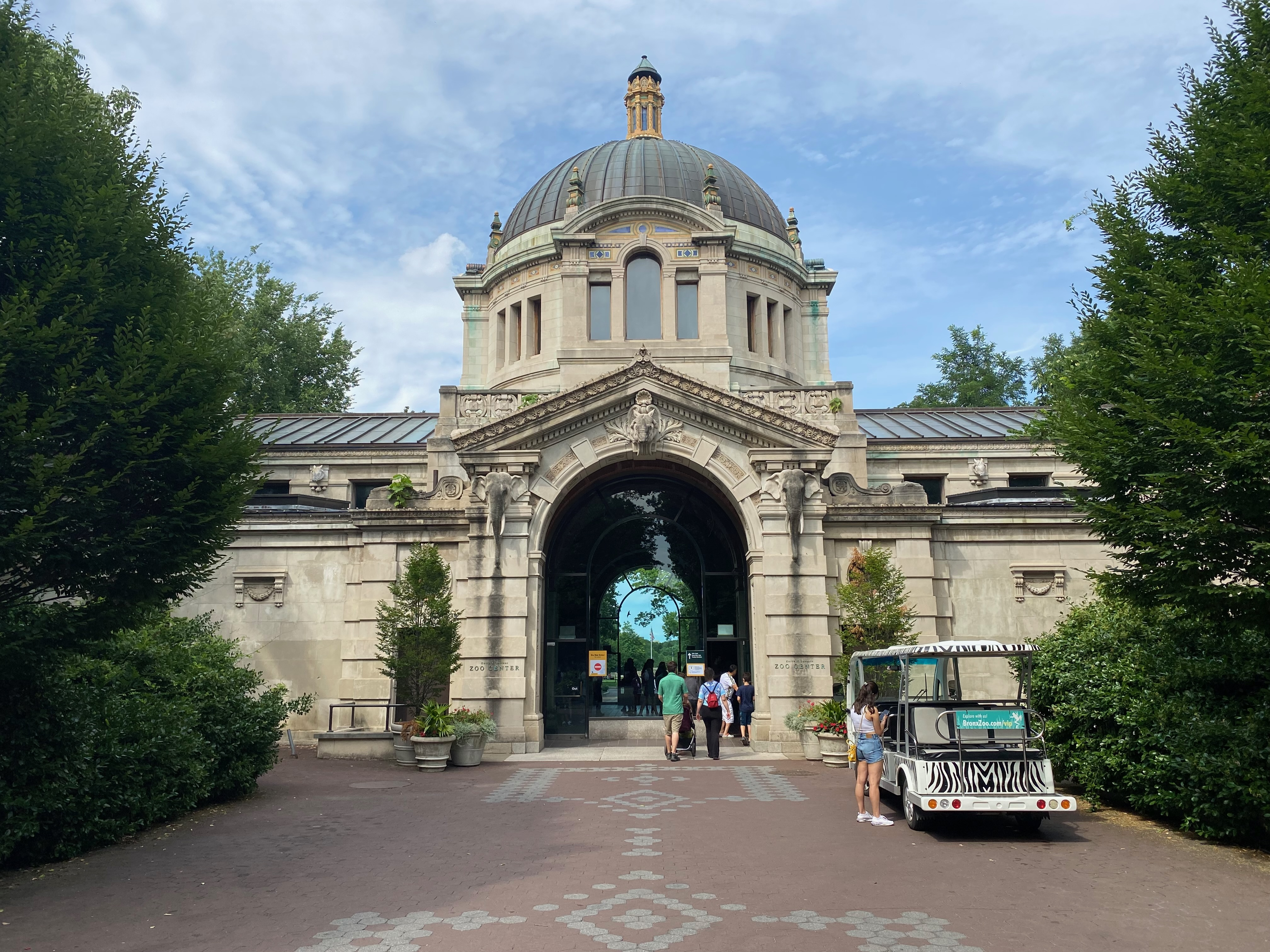
The Zoo Center

The Zoo Center, built in 1908, is a one-story Beaux-Arts building located in Astor Court. The exhibit houses blue tree monitors, Mertens' water monitors and spiny-tailed monitors indoors and has both indoor and outdoor enclosures for Komodo dragons, Aldabra giant tortoises and southern white rhinoceros. The building's animal frieze was carved by A. P. Proctor. In 2000, the building was landmarked. The building is east of the Children's Zoo and south of Madagascar!.

The building was originally designed as the zoo's Elephant House and has held all three elephant species over its history. The building has also been home to various rhinoceros species, hippopotamus, Bactrian camel, Malayan tapir and North Sulawesi babirusa. The building also held Rapunzel, one of the few Sumatran rhinos held in U.S. zoos, until her death in 2005.

==== Bison Range ====
The Bison Range is in the northeast corner of the zoo, and has been a feature of the zoo since its opening, having been only renovated since 1971. The range initially served to breed Plains bison, who were in danger of becoming extinct in the United States. The exhibit is one of the few large herds of bison in U.S. zoos. In 1913, at the behest of the American Bison Society, fourteen bison were transported from the range to Montana's National Bison Range, as well as to Wind Cave National Park in South Dakota.

==== Northern Ponds ====
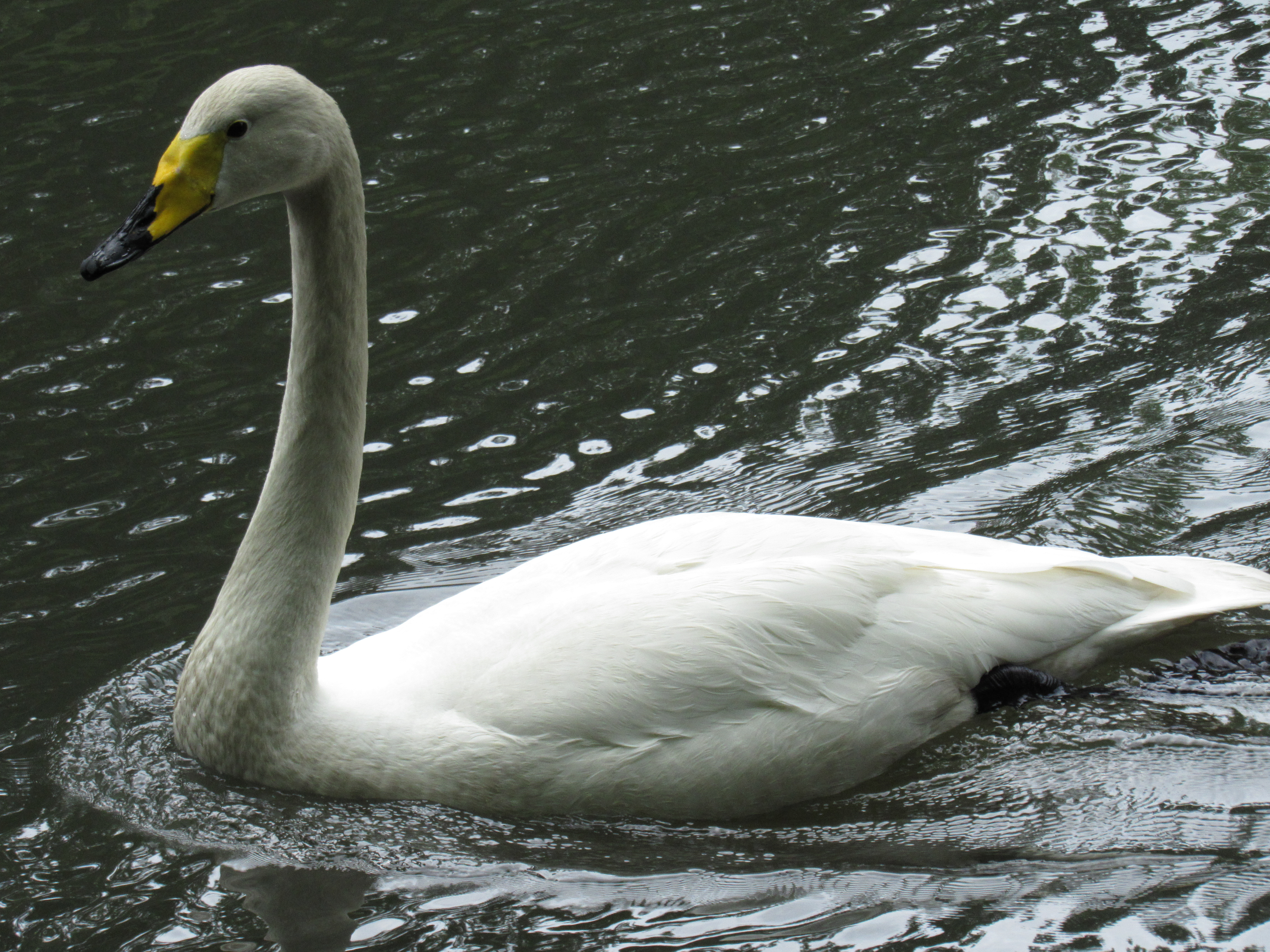
Swan wading through one of the many ponds

Northern Ponds is a series of naturalistic ponds home to a variety of waterfowl and other aquatic birds both wild and captive. Captive residents include red-crowned cranes, red-breasted geese, lesser white-fronted geese, ruddy ducks, barnacle geese, mute swans and trumpeter swans. A wide variety of wild bird species can also be found in the ponds, including several native ducks such as mallards and mergansers, as well as other birds such as black-capped night-herons.

In June 2024, a red-crowned crane chick hatched in this exhibit.

==== Mitsubishi Riverwalk ====
The Mitsubishi Riverwalk is a path that curves around the Bronx River, on the opposite bank from the zoo. It opened in 2004 upon the completion of a cleanup project on the river. The walkway was funded by Mitsubishi International Corporation Foundation and protects 15 acres (6.1 ha) of Bronx River watershed.

=== Paid exhibits and attractions ===
One admission to a premium exhibit costs $7 per exhibit if paid separately. A holder of a limited admission may upgrade for a fee, granting the ticket holder free access to all attractions for that day. Family memberships include full access.

There are nine premium exhibit attractions:

- Budgie Landing
- Bug Carousel
- Butterfly Garden
- Children's Zoo
- Congo Gorilla Forest
- JungleWorld
- Nature Trek
- Wild Asia Monorail
- Zoo Shuttle

==== Budgie Landing ====
Budgie Landing is an exhibit featuring of 1,000 budgerigars which opened on May 27, 2023. Unlike premium attractions and exhibits, Budgie Landing requires all visitors pay a small entrance fee ($5 for regular guests and $3 for members). A complementary feeding stick is handed out with admission.

==== Bug Carousel ====
The Bug Carousel has seats shaped like insects. Installed in 2005, it has an annual ridership of 540,000 as of 2014.

==== Butterfly Garden ====
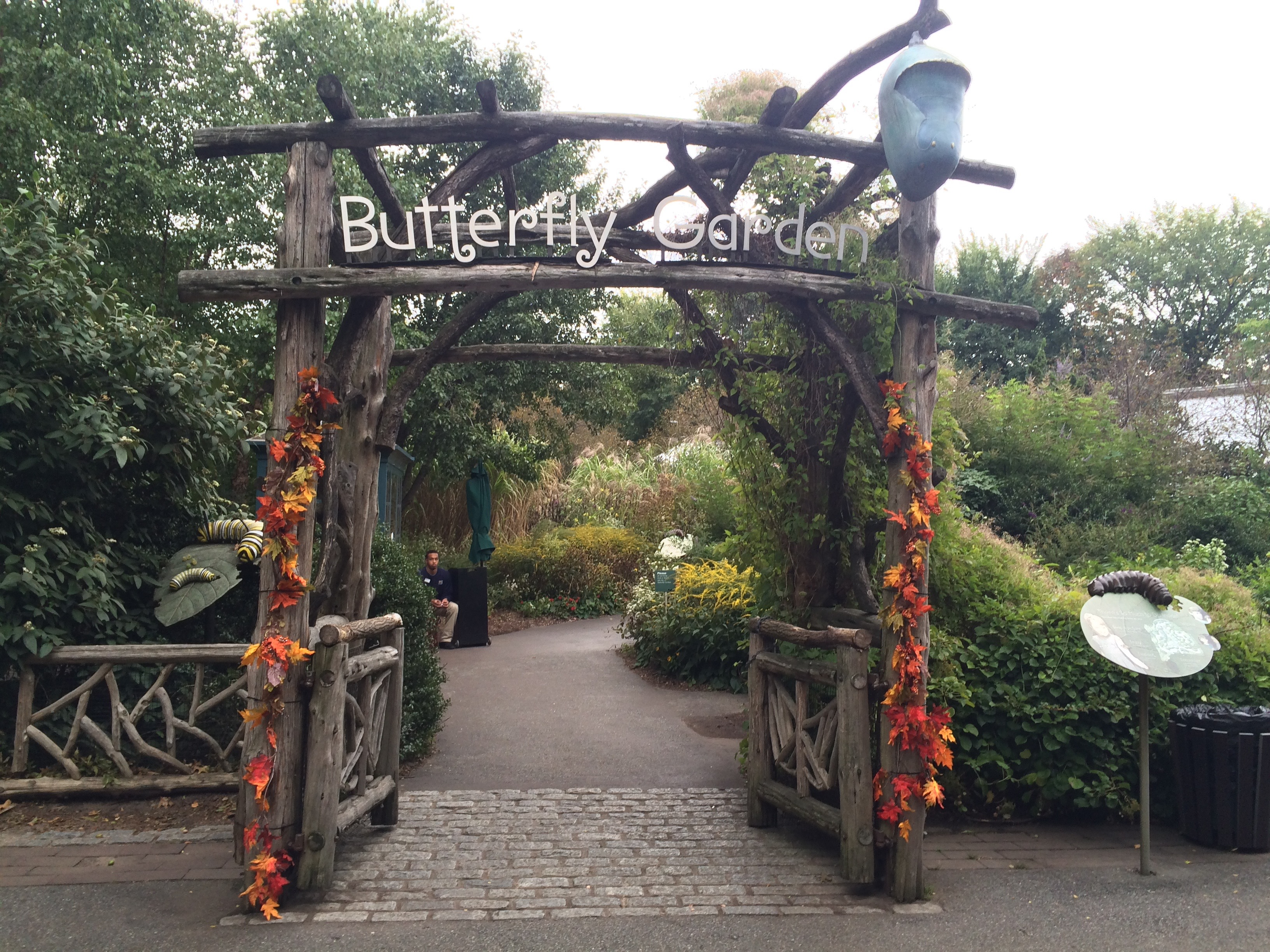
Butterfly Garden

This permanent structure is an indoor butterfly conservatory which lets visitors walk through gardens and meadows and watch the butterflies up close. Built and inaugurated in mid-1996, the attraction is a 170-foot-long maze, where "visitors can walk through the stages of a monarch's metamorphosis" with a greenhouse in the middle hosting 44 species and over 1,000 butterflies; the greenhouse is really "a plastic tent on an aluminum frame".

The structure, costing $500,000, is the precursor for a future permanent House of Invertebrates in the Monkey House near the Fordham Road entrance. Many species come from the New York metropolitan area, and all species of butterflies and moths are from around the continent. If not successful, the Oklahoma City Zoo would have purchased it in September 1997.

Before the Butterfly Garden opened, this was where the Great Ape House was located, and it was once home to gorillas, chimpanzees, orangutans, and gibbons through the exhibit's history.

==== Children's Zoo ====
The original Children's Zoo in the Bronx Zoo opened in 1941 with a nursery-rhyme theme; in 1981, a new Children's Zoo opened, and was instantly successful, seeing almost 250,000 visitors in two months. It closed for renovations in 2013; it reopened on May 30, 2015, with new exhibits featuring giant anteaters, common degus, Patagonian maras, white-nosed coatis, Linnaeus's two-toed sloths, squirrel monkeys, American flamingos, Asian small-clawed otters, North American porcupines, great horned owls, striped skunks, prairie dogs, fennec foxes, African spurred tortoises, Nubian goats, zebus, alpacas, sheep, donkeys, chickens, ducks, pigs, geese, and domestic turkeys.

==== Congo Gorilla Forest ====
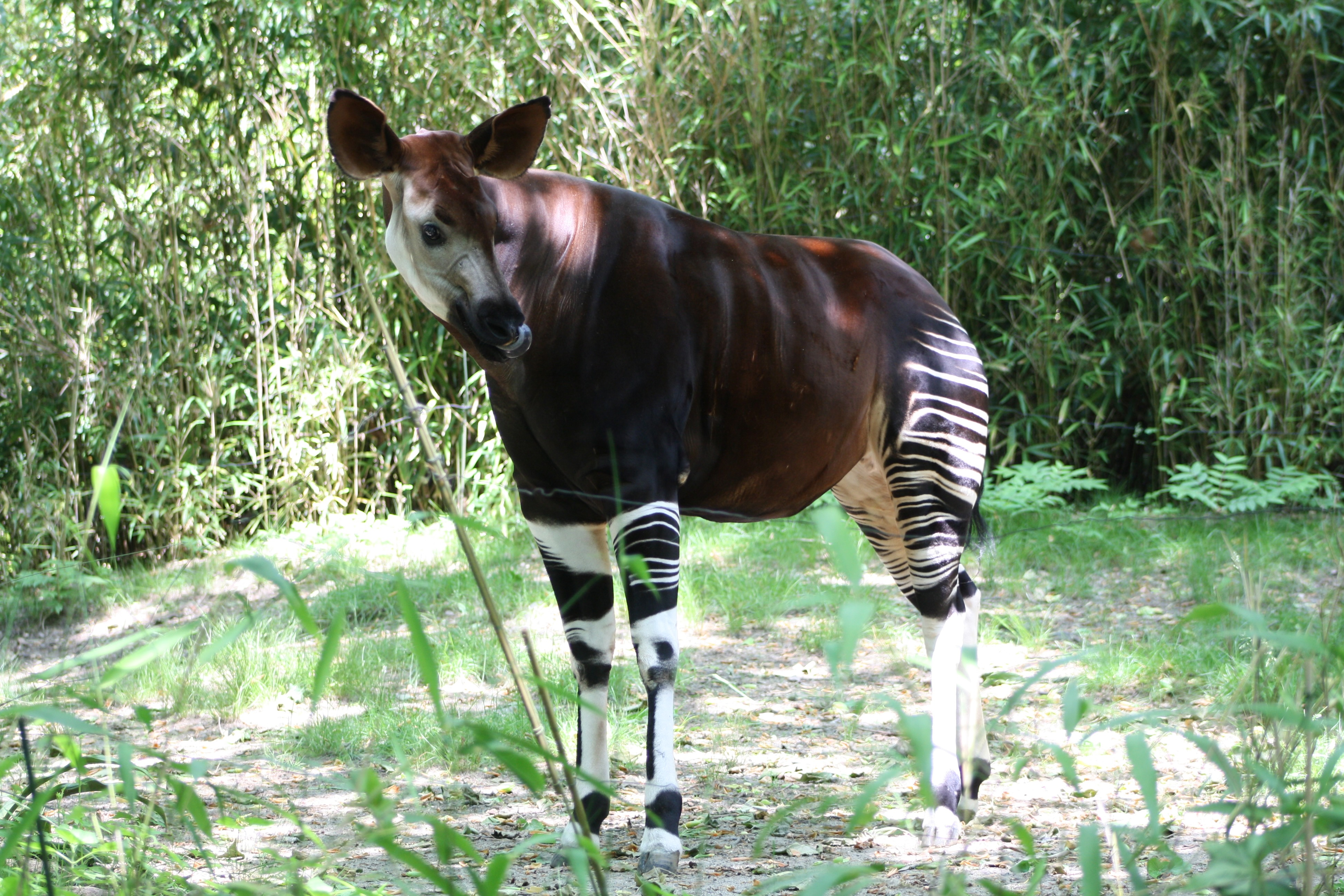
Okapi in the Congo Gorilla Forest exhibit

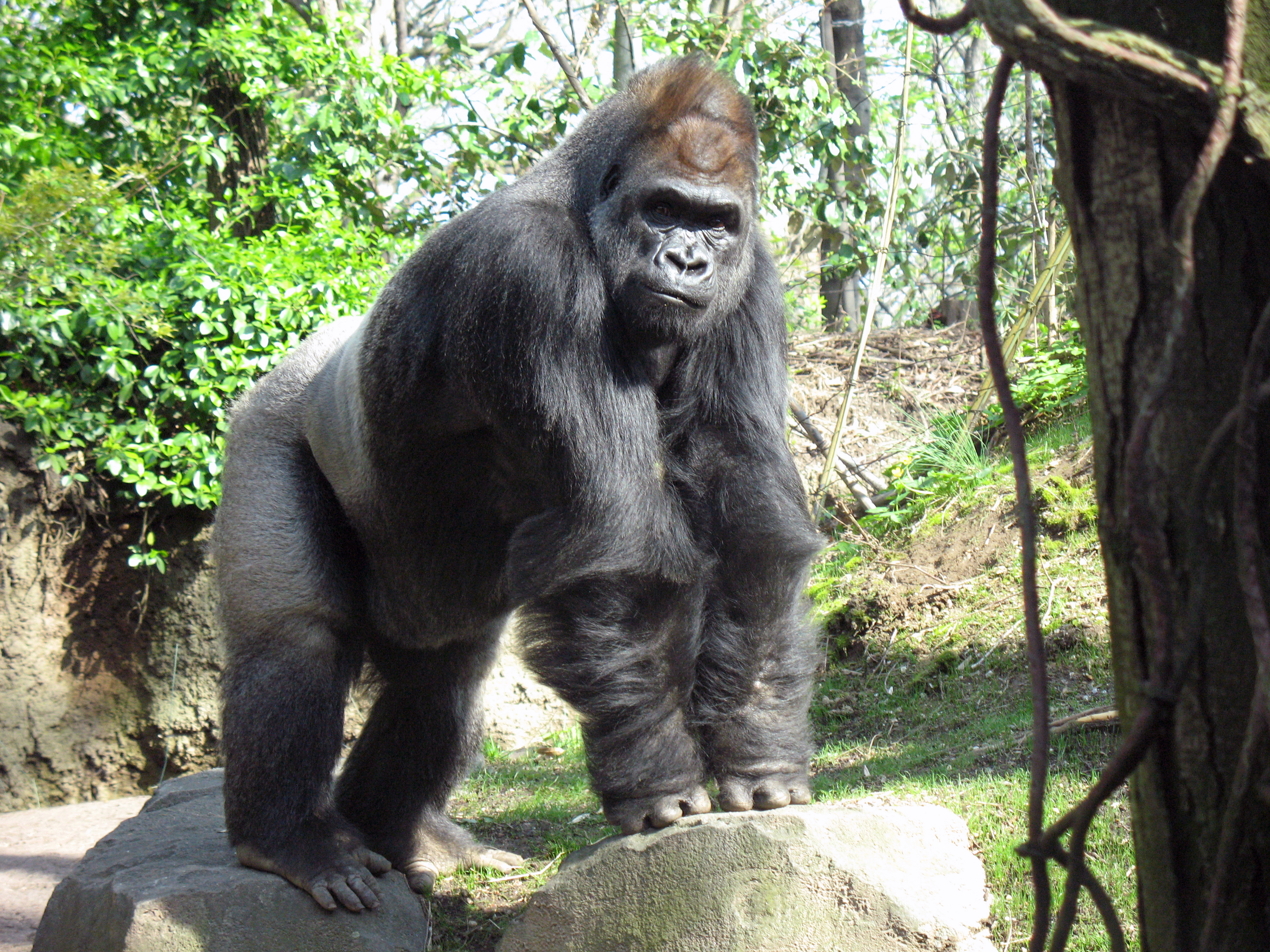
An adult male silverback

In the southwestern part of the zoo, Congo Gorilla Forest is a 6.5-acre (2.6 ha) rainforest that is home to the 20 or so western lowland gorillas in the zoo. Angolan colobus, Wolf's guenons, mandrills, okapis, red river hogs, an ornate monitor, and an African rock python also call this area home. It also includes a bird exhibit that houses white-crested hornbills, Congo peafowls, and African pygmy geese.

The Congo Gorilla Forest was opened in 1999 and was visited 7,000,000 times as of 2009. In one of the largest breeding groups of western lowland gorillas in North America, the exhibit has two troops of gorillas, for a total of 19 gorillas. Since 1999, 14 gorillas, 23 red river hogs, 11 Wolf's guenons, and four okapis have been born in the exhibit. There is also an 8-minute film in the middle of the exhibit, as well as viewing points throughout. In total, there are about 400 animals from 55 species. Over $10.6 million for conservation of Central African habitats has been collected in donations since the exhibit's opening, and the exhibit has netted $12.5 million in exhibit fees as of 2014.

Before the Congo Gorilla Forest was constructed, this site was once South America, and it is known to house pygmy hippopotamuses, tapirs, giant anteaters, Patagonian maras, guanacos, greater rheas, babirusas, brocket deer, and peccaries.

==== JungleWorld ====
This exhibit is an indoor tropical jungle and home to nearly 800 species including Asian small-clawed otters, Javan lutungs, silvery lutungs, northern white-cheeked gibbons, Matschie's tree-kangaroos, gharials, a clouded leopard, common treeshrews, a carpet python, northern Luzon giant cloud rats, greater mouse deer, Malayan tapirs, and lesser adjutants living in mangroves and on the beaches. Visitors can watch the gibbons swinging or singing and watch the otters play. The exhibit includes species that are usually on the jungle floor including stag beetles, scorpions and fire-bellied toads, but behind glass. A pond with a waterfall lets visitors sit and observe gourami and Fly River turtles.

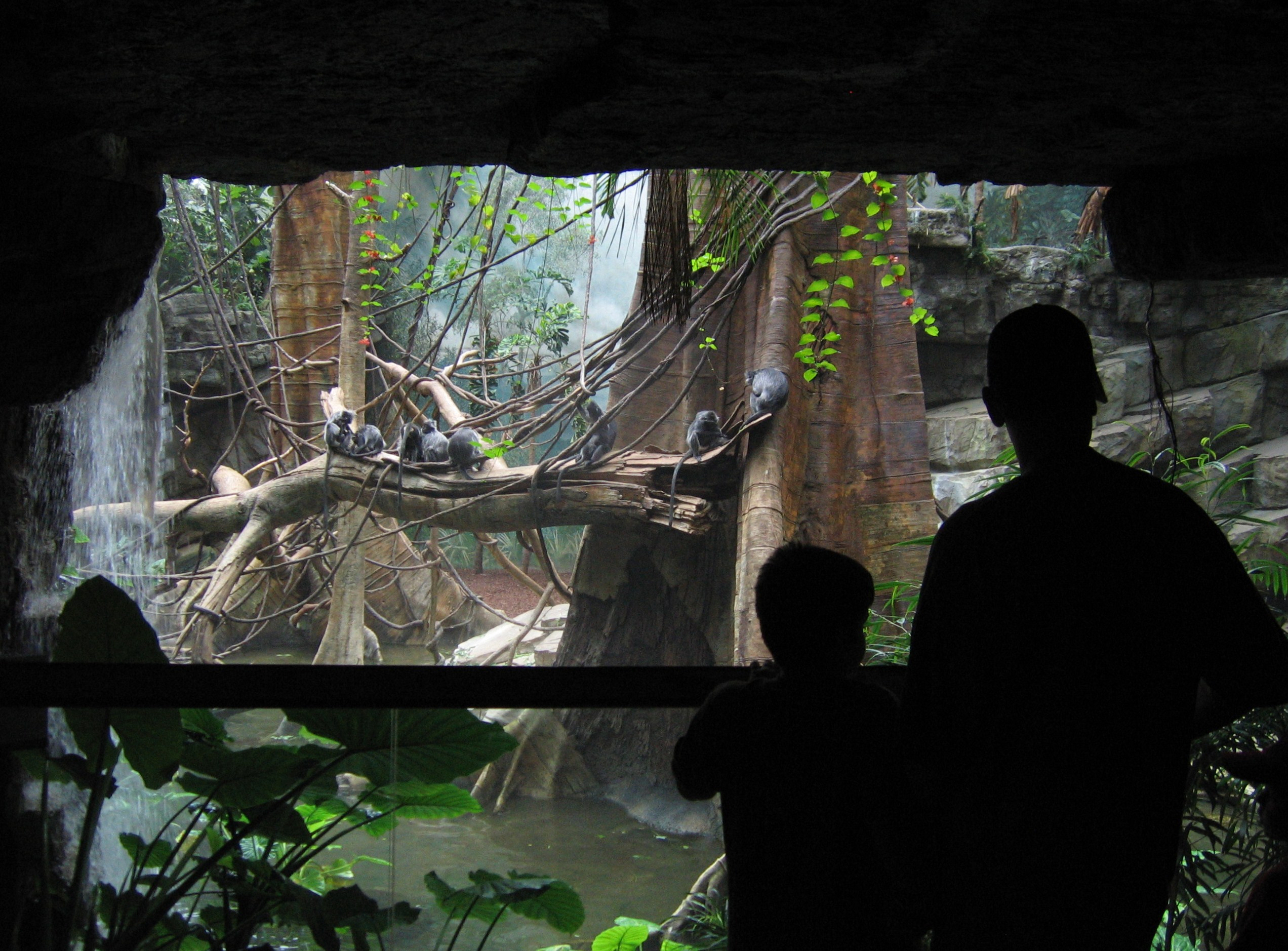
Silvery lutungs (Trachypithecus cristatus), at JungleWorld

Planning for JungleWorld, in the southeastern Wild Asia portion of the zoo, was started in 1977 and completed at a cost of $9.5 million in June 1985. $4.1 million in funds were donated by Enid A. Haupt, a member of the New York Zoological Society's board of trustees. The building is the largest at the zoo with an area of 1 acre (4,000 m^{2}) and a height of 55 ft (17 m). There is a wooden path that meanders for 0.13 mi (210 m).

The building's design integrates its environment with the path, as no bars are present in the building; the walkway has no full-height barriers and short railings; and only by means of ravines, streams, or cliffs are most of the animals separated from people and each other. There is a volcanic scrub forest, a mangrove swamp, a lowland evergreen rain forest with giant trees which merges into a mountain rain forest and five museum-like galleries connecting and explaining the habitats. The building was built to emphasize the fact that 150 acres (61 ha) of rainforest is lost every minute.

==== Wild Asia Monorail ====
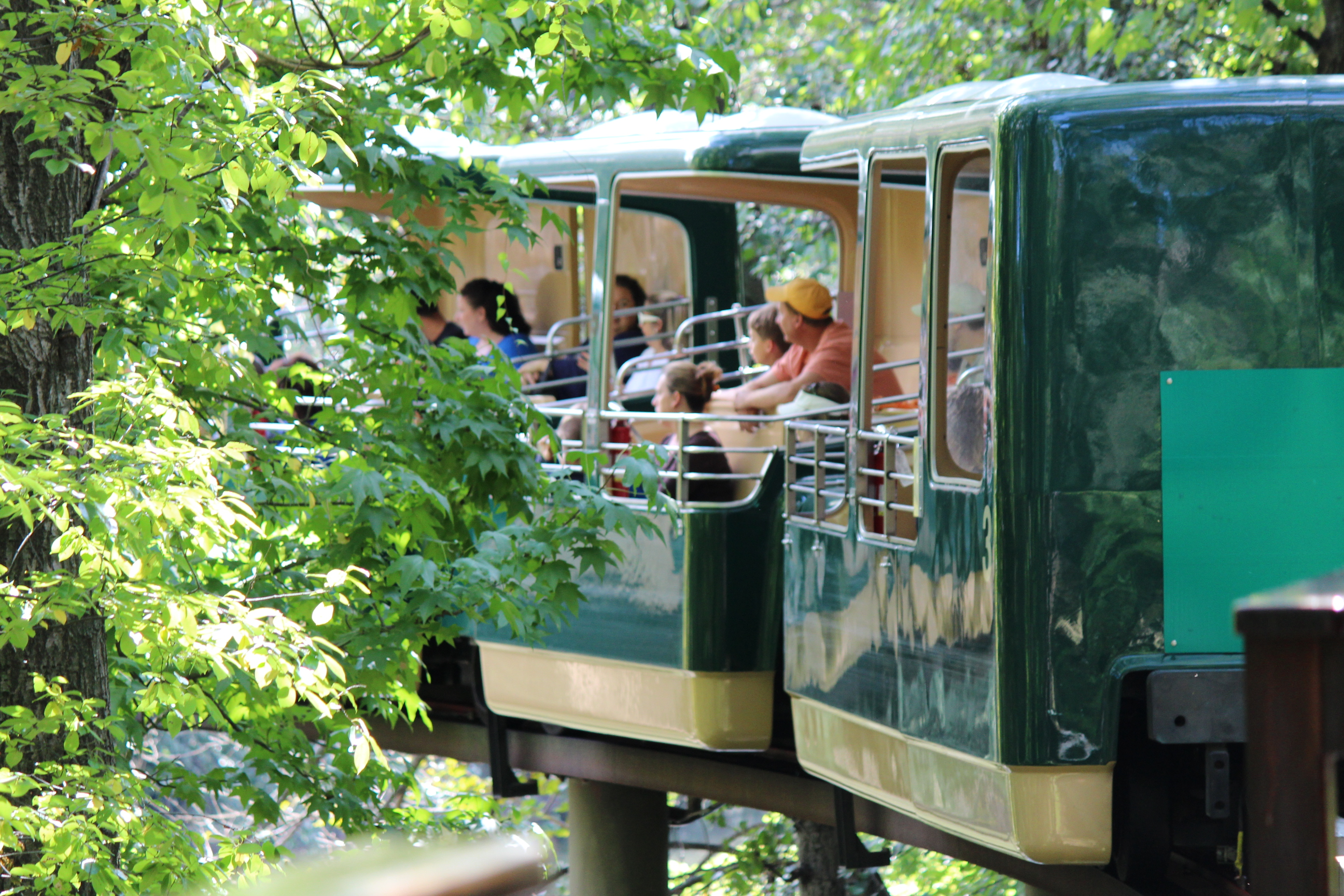
The Monorail

The monorail was inaugurated in 1977 with the rest of the formerly underdeveloped Wild Asia section of the zoo. There are six 9-car monorails on this 1.6 mi (2.6 km) ride, originally built by Rohr; the ride was refurbished in 2007. Some animals in the zoo can only be seen on this ride such as tigers, Przewalski's horses, greater one-horned rhinoceroses, a 57 year old Asian elephant named Patty, red pandas, and a plethora of even-toed ungulates such as axis deer, barasingha, blackbuck, Bactrian deer, gaurs, brow-antlered deer, babirusas, sambar deer, nilgai, red muntjacs, Indian hog deer, Formosan sika deer, tufted deer, Himalayan tahrs, and markhors.

This ride takes visitors through a 40-acre (16 ha) area that recreates the mud wallows and pastures, forests and riverbanks of Asia. Visitors will see tigers, an Asian elephant, rhinos and wild horses in their natural habitats. As the monorail travels along the Bronx River, visitors can see native animals including egrets, turtles, and ducks. The monorail is accessible for wheelchairs up to 26 inches (66 cm) wide. Smaller chairs are available at the monorail platform for visitors with wider wheelchairs or motorized scooters.

==== Nature Trek ====
Nature Trek opened on July 1, 2017, in the southeast portion of the park near Wild Asia. It consists of twelve covered rope bridges connecting small porches on the sides of towers. There are also elevated tunnels and a large overlook, as well as several small challenges resembling American Ninja Warrior obstacles. On the ground is a play area with a sandbox, water sprinklers and structures, and branches. Nature Trek is partially wheelchair-accessible and contains ramps of varying difficulties. This attraction discourages visitors who are wearing footwear such as flip-flops; high heels are prohibited. As part of a push for environmental sustainability, some parts of the attraction are made of black locust, and the structures use existing trees within the forest.

==== Bronx Zoo Treetop Adventure ====
The Treetop Adventure section opened on July 7, 2017, in the northeast portion of the park near Bronx River Parking. It consists of seven different levels of rope courses: two each of beginner, intermediate, and advanced, and one expert course. There is also a 400 ft (120 m) zip-line course traversing 50 ft (15 m) the Bronx River in both directions. The attraction also contains rope and swinging bridges, ladders and rolling and swinging objects. Separate from the rest of the zoo, it charges its own entry fee; the fee is only applied to those who are climbing on the objects or using the zip-line. Open year-round, the attraction prohibits riders who are less than 7 years old and less than 50 lb (23 kg), or more than 275 lb (125 kg). After 6 years of operation, Treetop Adventure closed in 2023.

==== Dinosaur Safari ====
Dinosaur Safari takes visitors on a safari ride through a normally off-exhibit 2-acre wooded area and features animatronic dinosaurs from throughout time, starting at 300-million-years ago in the Permian Period and ending 235-million-years later in the Cretaceous Period. The ride lasts approximately 20 minutes. The "robo-saurs" are manufactured by Billings Productions, who lease them out to sites all over the world. The exhibit features more popular species such as the Tyrannosaurus rex, Triceratops, Stegosaurus, Velociraptor and Brachiosaurus, as well as less well-known species such as the Pachycephalosaurus, Carnotaurus and Spinosaurus. The ride's Dilophosaurus spit water at visitors as a nod to the species' acid-spitting abilities in Steven Spielberg's Jurassic Park film and Michael Crichton's novel, even though there is no reason to believe the living animal did so. The exhibit originally ran through the summers of 2013 and 2014 and returned for the 2019 season. It also returned for the 2022 season as a walking trail, and after a three year hiatus.

On April 12, 2025, Dinosaur Safari opened once again. Visitors can get up-close to life-sized animatronics of dinosaurs and pterosaurs plus 11 new ones. Kids can dig up ancient fossils in a sandbox, and they can walk through a ribcage and enjoy photo ops with dinosaur eggs.

=== Former exhibits ===
==== Rare Animal Range ====
Rare Animal Range was a trail which focused on highly endangered species. Featured species included guanaco, Formosan sika deer, pied ruffed lemurs and blue-eyed black lemurs. The exhibit also had duplicate enclosures for the zoo's Arabian oryx, blesbok, Père David's deer and broad-snouted caiman as well as a large pond with a pair of small islands in the center which were home to a pair of golden-cheeked gibbons. They had the Big Birds exhibits, which were lawns for ostriches, emus, rheas, and cassowaries. Due to budget cuts and the unpopularity of many of the species, the zoo was forced to close the exhibit in 2009.

While most of the species left the zoo when the exhibit closed, the Formosan sika deer were moved to the Wild Asia Monorail and the Père David's deer remained in their primary enclosure across from Tiger Mountain while the blue-eyed black lemurs were moved to Madagascar! where they are rotated with the Coquerel's sifakas. While no longer at the zoo, pied ruffed lemurs can still be seen at the zoo's partner institute, the Central Park Zoo. The zoo's popular Dinosaur Safari ran through a part of this area and the zoo's yearly Run for the Wild event runs through its entirety.

On April 20, 2024, the Animal Chronicles opened in honor of the 125th Anniversary of the Bronx Zoo. it features 13 scenes of 68 animal eco-sculptures that showcase key achievements in the zoo's 125 year history of saving animal species and connecting visitors to wildlife.

==== Skyfari ====
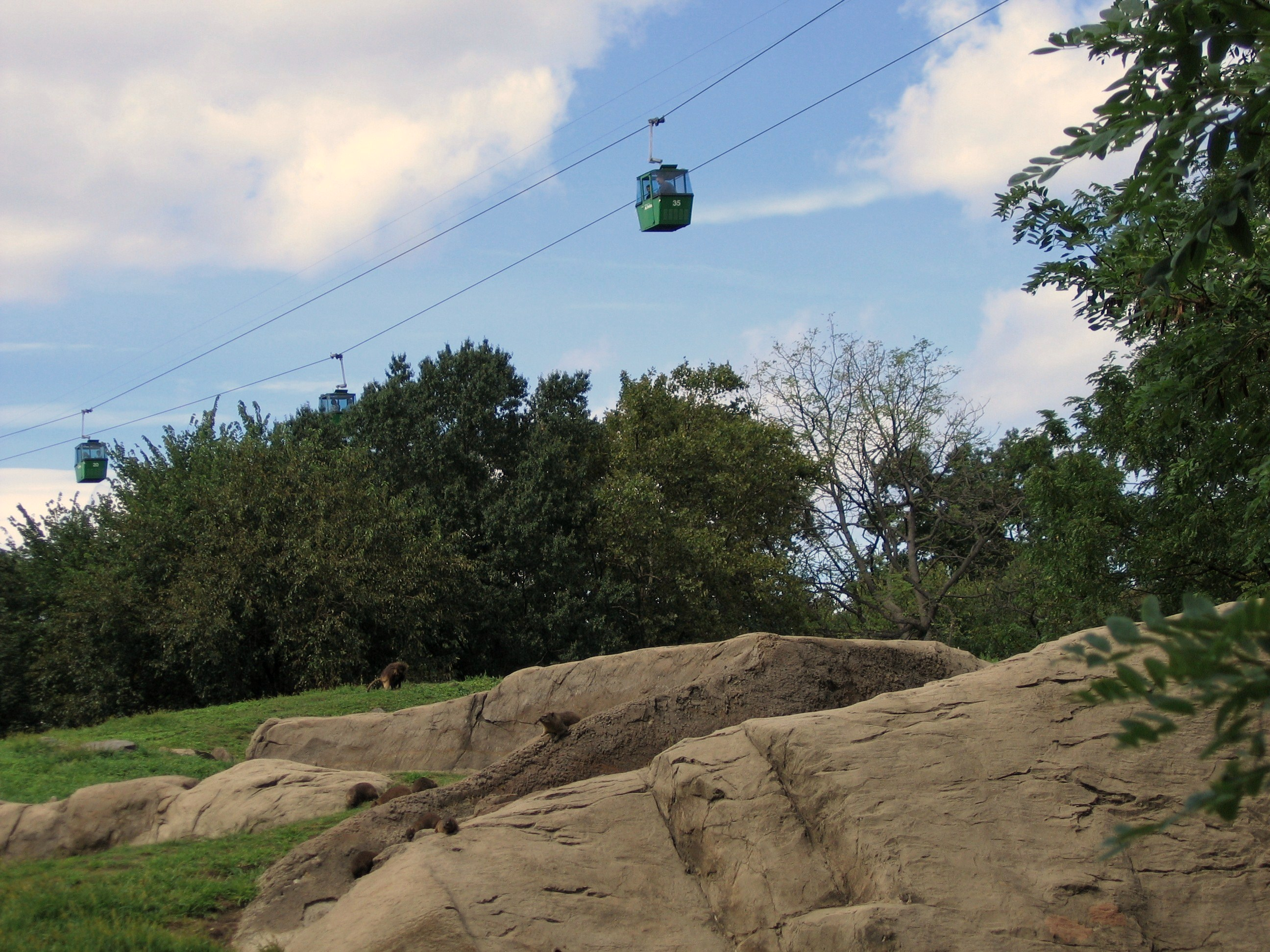
Skyfari gondolas

The Skyfari was a popular gondola lift which transported visitors from the Zoo Center to the Asian Plaza, running over African Plains and several other popular exhibits at the zoo. The seasonal exhibit ran from April to October and rose 60 to 100 ft (18 to 30 m) feet in the air. With around 490,000 riders annually, the lift was the zoo's third most popular attraction after Congo Gorilla Forest and the Wild Asia Monorail. Despite its popularity, ticket sales for it were barely breaking-even and maintenance costs led to a loss of profit. On July 8, 2008, high winds and heat led to one of the cars derailing, which trapped thirty-six passengers for up to five hours. Due to this, along with heavy budget cuts, the ride was permanently closed in January 2009, after 35 years of operation.

==== Monkey House ====
The Monkey House, which first opened in 1901 and was originally named the Primate House, closed in late February 2012 after 111 years of operation. At the time of closing, it was home to cotton-top tamarins, white-faced sakis, Wied's marmosets, moustached tamarins, black-chinned emperor tamarins, Goeldi's monkeys and grey-handed night-monkeys, as well as Brazilian porcupines and Pallas's long-tongued bats. This was the building where Ota Benga, a young man from the Congo, spent most of his time during his stay at the zoo. He had his own exhibit and was often mocked by the visitors.

Some of the primates that were in the now-closed exhibit have been moved to other parts of the zoo, such as the cotton-top tamarins now being found in World of Birds; others were sent to other New York City zoos, such as the sakis being moved to the Central Park Zoo. White-headed capuchins can still be seen in an outdoor cage behind the building.

==== Amazing Amphibians ====
Amazing Amphibians was a short-lived exhibition which opened in the zoo's Zoo Center in June 2008 and only remained for a few years. The exhibit featured several educational displays on amphibian conservation as well as a few terrariums containing several amphibian species. Highlight species included Chacoan horned frog, Puerto Rican crested toad, smooth-sided toad and common mudpuppy.

While none of these species are currently on-exhibit at the zoo, the Puerto Rican crested toads can be seen at the Central Park Zoo, which breeds this species for reintroduction back into Puerto Rico.

==== 4-D Theater ====
The 4-D Theater showed 4-D films with the help of 3-D film and built-in sensory effects, including moving seats, wind, mist, and scents. Produced by SimEx-Iwerks, the theater showed condensed versions of popular children's movies. The 4-D Theater previously showed Ice Age: Dawn of the Dinosaurs , one episode of Dora the Explorer, Rio and Storks. It closed in 2019 and was replaced with a giraffe encounter where guests can feed the giraffes for a fee.

==== The Most Dangerous Animal in the World ====
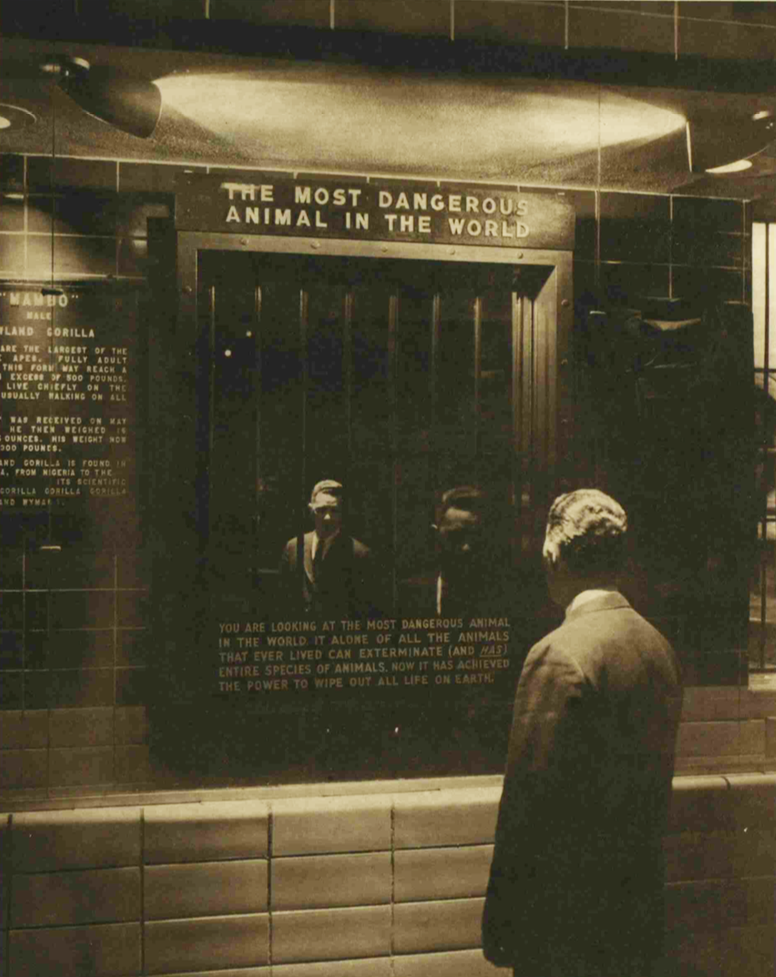
The Most Dangerous Animal in the World exhibit at the Bronx Zoo, 1963

The Most Dangerous Animal in the World exhibit debuted at the Bronx Zoo on April 26, 1963. The exhibit was installed at the Great Apes House and it featured a statement about the danger humans pose.

The words: "The Most Dangerous Animal in the World" were printed in red on top of a cage. Behind the bars of the cage there was a mirror. The exhibit was reportedly still at the zoo in 1981.

=== WCS's Run for the Wild ===
In April 2008, the zoo hosted the first Run for the Wild event. The event is a 5k run (5 km (3.1 mi) long) organized by the Wildlife Conservation Society with the goal of raising money and awareness for their conservation programs of endangered species. Each year, there is a set entry fee for participants with varying prices depending on age; child (3–15), adult, and senior (65+). WCS Members get a discounted fee. Along with the entry fee, there is a $35 minimum donation per adult/senior participant. The event offers free prizes for donors, based on donation size, ranging from a Run for the Wild T-shirt to a special animal experience at the zoo. All donations are tax-deductible. All participants are also offered free all-day entry to the zoo and its paid exhibits/attractions. The yearly event takes place at the end of April and originally began at 8 am for those wishing to actually run, and 8:45 for those who wish to simply walk or jog; the start times were changed to 7 am and 7:45 am in later years.

The event takes participants through the zoo before opening hours, starting at the Bronx River Parkway Entrance, through the Asian Plaza and African Plains, and ending by the Rockefeller Fountain near Astor Court. The trail also takes runners through the now-closed section of the zoo where the Rare Animal Range once stood. Each year, the event focuses on a specific endangered species or animal group to help raise funds for: 2009's run was for gorillas, 2010 focused on tigers, 2011 helped raise funds to protect the Punta Tombo peninsula of Argentina for Magellanic penguins, 2012 focused on lions, both 2013 and 2014 focused on elephants, 2015 once again was for gorillas, and 2016's run will allow participants to run on behalf of their favorite animal.

In 2011, another WCS institute, the New York Aquarium, held its own Run for the Wild event for sea turtles in early October. The 5k run began at the aquarium and led down the Riegelmann Boardwalk on Coney Island. The aquarium held a second run the following year for walruses. The event has not returned to the aquarium since.

== Conservation ==
In 1905, the zoo's first director, William T. Hornaday, along with President Theodore Roosevelt and other conservationists, created the American Bison Society (ABS) in an attempt to save the American bison from extinction. The bison had been depleted from tens-of-millions of animals to only a few hundred by the end of the 19th century due to westward expansion. The society worked to breed the species in captivity as well as raise public awareness, raise money to create protected reserves, and reintroduce bison back into the wild. On October 11, 1907, the first reintroduction of bison began when the zoo sent six males and nine females, by rail, to the Wichita Mountains Wildlife Refuge in Oklahoma. Seven days later, the animals were successfully reintroduced to the park. By 1935, the society, who had successfully carried out several more reintroductions from bison kept in zoos and ranches, considered their work done and disbanded that year.

In 2005, the Wildlife Conservation Society resurrected and re-purposed the ABS to, "help build the social and scientific foundations for the ecological restoration of bison", and, "restore bison ecologically, not just animals in pens but actual functioning animals in the larger landscape", (Keith Aune, WCS bison coordinator). According to a study published in 2012, virtually all wild and captive bison in the United States are hybrids with cattle genes, with the exception of the two distinct breeding populations within Yellowstone National Park and their descendants. The cattle genes entered the bison population due to private ranchers hybridizing their bison to make them more docile, with some of these animals being accidentally reintroduced by the ABS. In response, in the fall of 2011, the WCS arranged for a herd of female bison originating from the American Prairie Reserve to be sent to the Colorado State University's Animal Reproduction & Biotechnology Laboratory to be used as surrogates in an attempt to transfer the fertilized embryos of genetically pure bison. After an ultrasound showed one female to be pregnant, the herd was moved to the zoo where, on June 20, 2012, the calf was born. The herd is kept in an off-exhibit section of the zoo and the goal is to eventually create a breeding herd of genetically pure bison through embryo transfers with the surrogate hybrid bison.

In 1981, the zoo successfully implanted a gaur embryo into a Holstein cow in an attempt to clone the endangered species.

In 1990, the zoo experienced a pest problem with the Canada goose. The park had become so over-crowded with the geese, that the zoo had to take action to decrease their numbers. Apart from their presence, the geese were very aggressive towards other birds and occasionally carried diseases into the park. To cope with the problem, the zoo hired a sharpshooter, who killed 19 geese. Zoo workers also destroyed 144 eggs found on the property. In 1991, the zoo employed a gentler method of sterilizing the birds.

In 2005, the zoo sent the frozen sperm of a male Indian rhinoceros to the Cincinnati Zoo where, four years later in 2009, it was thawed out and used in the first successful artificial insemination of the species when a calf was born in late 2010. The calf did not survive long-term.

In August 2006, the zoo adopted an orphaned snow leopard cub, named Leo. The 13-month-old cub was found stuck in mud following a landslide in Naltar Valley in Pakistan. The landslide had killed the cub's mother. A Pakistani shepherd in the area found the cub with its female sibling, but the female had died a week later due to malnutrition. He then handed over the male cub to Pakistani authorities to care for him. Since there are no captive breeding programs or rehabilitation centers for snow leopards in Pakistan, the authorities decided to send the cub to the Bronx Zoo. The cat will be returned to its place of birth following construction of a rehab facility in the Naltar Valley with cooperation from the United States. On April 9, 2013, Leo sired a cub. He was the first cub of Leo.

In 2007, the zoo successfully reintroduced three Chinese alligators into the wild. In July 2009, the zoo announced that the reintroduced alligators had begun breeding naturally in the wild, producing 15 hatchlings. The breeding was a milestone in the zoo's 10-year effort to reintroduce the species to the Yangtze River in China.

In January 2010, the zoo adopted four abandoned brown bear cubs. Three of the bears, two males and one female, were siblings born in 2009 and rescued from the ABC Islands in Alaska. The cubs were named Kootz, Denali, and Sitka. The fourth cub, a grizzly bear born in 2008, was rescued from Glacier National Park in Montana and named Glacier after the park. In 2015, two other rescued grizzly bears, who had been at the zoo since 1995, were sent to one of the zoo's partner institutions, the Central Park Zoo.

The next month, an "assurance colony" of Kihansi spray toads was placed in the zoo. The species disappeared in their native Tanzania home.

In February 2011, the zoo took in two bald eagles that were rescued in Wyoming. The 5-year-old male was found in 2008 and was believed to have been hit by a car. The 3-year-old female was believed to have been injured during a storm. The birds were taken in by the U.S. Fish and Wildlife Service and sent to the Woodford Cedar Run Wildlife Refuge in New Jersey for evaluation and care, where it was decided they were unable to survive in the wild.

In December 2012, five Chinese yellow-headed box turtles, a critically endangered species, were born.

In December 2015, the zoo rescued a juvenile Indian cobra which had stowed away on a cargo ship destined for New Jersey. The snake was found in poor condition being dehydrated, cold, and exposed to oil residue. The animal was brought to the zoo for recovery. It's unclear how the snake got onto the ship since it set out from Singapore, which is outside of the species' natural range.

== Incidents ==
=== Human fatality ===
On July 29, 1985, two female Siberian tigers killed 24-year-old animal keeper Robin Silverman after she entered their enclosure with a volunteer aide. It was unclear why Silverman entered the enclosure; the zoo's general curator suspected a lapse in Silverman's concentration, while her family suspected a failure on the part of the zoo. It was the first and only human fatality in the zoo's history.

=== Human injury ===
On May 3, 1986, a 325-pound female gorilla named Mookey bit 29-year-old zookeeper Linda Lamphere in the hand. Her right thumb and the top of her right index finger were bitten off; her fingers were reattached by surgery. (Note: The N.Y. Times said Lamphere had undergone surgery to restore her thumb; the L.A. Times said her index finger)

=== Non-human deaths ===
In 2001, the zoo added a troop of Javan langurs to JungleWorld, sharing an enclosure with Asian small-clawed otters. Since the addition of the langurs, they were sighted taunting and provoking the otters. In June 2007, a romp of otters grabbed a langur near the water and proceeded to maul and drown it in full view of visitors. A zookeeper on the viewing deck attempted to break up the fight by whistling at the otters. To no avail of the keeper, the otters killed the langur. Part of the incident was recorded and uploaded to YouTube.

In 2010, the otters were relocated into two exhibits, one at the Children's Zoo and another in JungleWorld.

=== Animal escapes ===
In 1902, a seven-month-old male jaguar broke out of his cage and escaped.

In July 1957, a platypus named Penelope who had recently made headlines for faking a pregnancy disappeared, abandoning her mate, Cecil. Zookeepers searched the premises but found no evidence of her.

In February 1995, the zoo's De Jur Aviary collapsed during a snowstorm with about 100 seabirds, including Inca terns and gulls, inside. During the collapse, some of the residents flew off and escaped. In total, about 30 birds were lost.

On March 26, 2011, the Bronx Zoo announced that World of Reptiles was closed after a venomous adolescent cobra was discovered missing from its off-exhibit enclosure on March 25. Zoo officials were confident the missing cobra would be found in the building and not outside, since the species is known to be uncomfortable in open areas. The missing snake quickly sparked a popular Twitter parody account, @BronxZoosCobra, which narrated the daily hijinks of the cobra. On March 31, zoo authorities found the snake in a non-public area of the reptile house.

On May 9, 2011, a female green peafowl escaped from the zoo before being caught on May 11.

On September 11, 2011, a lesser kudu escaped from its enclosure for about half an hour and then returned to its enclosure once a zoo worker opened the gate.

On April 26, 2023, an Indian peafowl given the nickname Raul escaped from the zoo and reportedly bit a man, although those reports were never confirmed. Raul flew back into the zoo at 11:17 a.m. the next day.

=== Happy the Elephant ===
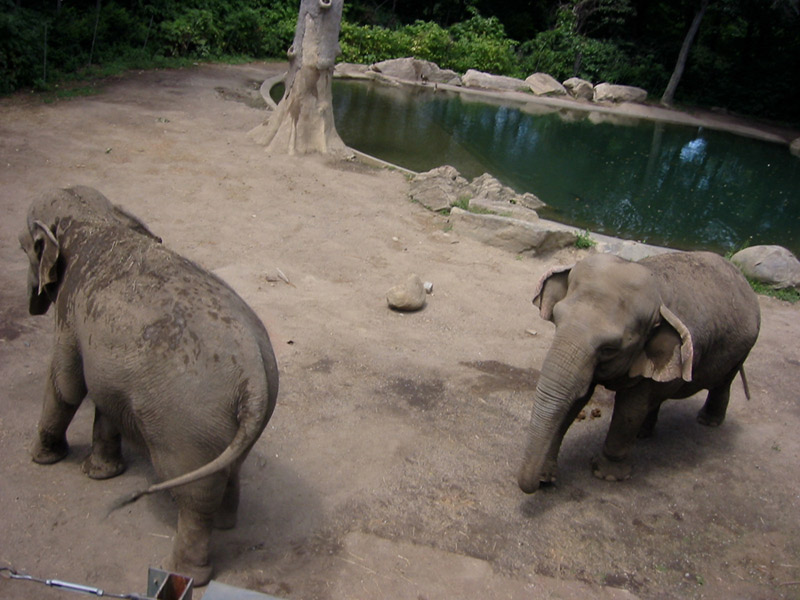
Elephants at the zoo

In the early 1970s, seven Indian elephants, named after the Seven Dwarfs from Snow White, were captured as calves in Thailand and dispersed among multiple U.S. zoos and circuses. Two of those calves, Grumpy and Happy, both females, were brought to the zoo in 1977. Over the next 25 years, the pair lived together, separated from the zoo's other elephants. In July 2002, the zoo attempted to mix the pair with two other females, Patty and Maxine. However, the introduction failed when Patty and Maxine attacked the pair and injured Grumpy. Over the next several months, the elephant's injuries worsened and, in October of that year, the zoo was forced to euthanize her. With her lifelong companion gone, Happy was paired with the zoo's younger female, Sammy, whose companion, Tus, had also died in 2002. The two got along very well until Sammy developed severe liver disease and was also euthanized in early 2006. This left Patty, Maxine, and Happy as the zoo's only remaining elephants.

Despite the fact that elephants are highly social animals, the zoo decided that making a second attempt at introducing Happy to the others was too risky, with there being too high a chance that she would be attacked. She has since lived without the company of other elephants. Due to this, the zoo has been criticized by multiple animal rights organizations for supposedly mistreating Happy. People for the Ethical Treatment of Animals (PETA) filed a formal complaint against the zoo with the Association of Zoos and Aquariums (AZA), calling for them to strip the zoo of its accreditation. In Defense of Animals (IDA) has named the zoo the "Hall of Shame Winner" on their 2015, 2016, and 2017 'Ten Worst Zoos for Elephants'. IDA listed the zoo fourth on their 2012 list, fifth on their 2013 and 2014 lists, and eighth on their 2009 list. These organizations, as well as many online petitions (some of which gain up to 200,000 supporters), have called on the zoo to send Happy to an elephant sanctuary. However, the zoo said that moving her at this stage in her life might be potentially traumatizing for her, and that she has very strong bonds with her keepers and is well-adjusted to the zoo, where she has spent well over thirty years of her life.

In 2012, a reporter for the New York Post wrote that she is kept inside all year and in solitary confinement. The zoo claims that she and the other two elephants have equal access to outdoor yards, and that the three elephants have limited interactions with each other and extensive interactions with zoo keepers. All three animals share the same barn, but Happy lives in separate stalls and yards. In late 2018, one of the zoo's other elephants, Maxine, was euthanized due to complications with her liver and kidneys.

A lawsuit against the Bronx Zoo, stating that Happy was legally "a person with a right to be free", was dismissed in February 2020 by a judge of the Bronx County Supreme Court. However, in May 2021, the New York Court of Appeals agreed to hear the appeal, filed on behalf of Happy by the Nonhuman Rights Project. In June 2022, the Court of Appeals also ruled in favor of the zoo, saying in a 5–2 decision that the writ of habeas corpus did not apply to nonhuman animals.

Happy was euthanized in May 2026 at the age of 55, leaving Patty who is 57 years old the zoo's remaining elephant.

=== Ota Benga ===
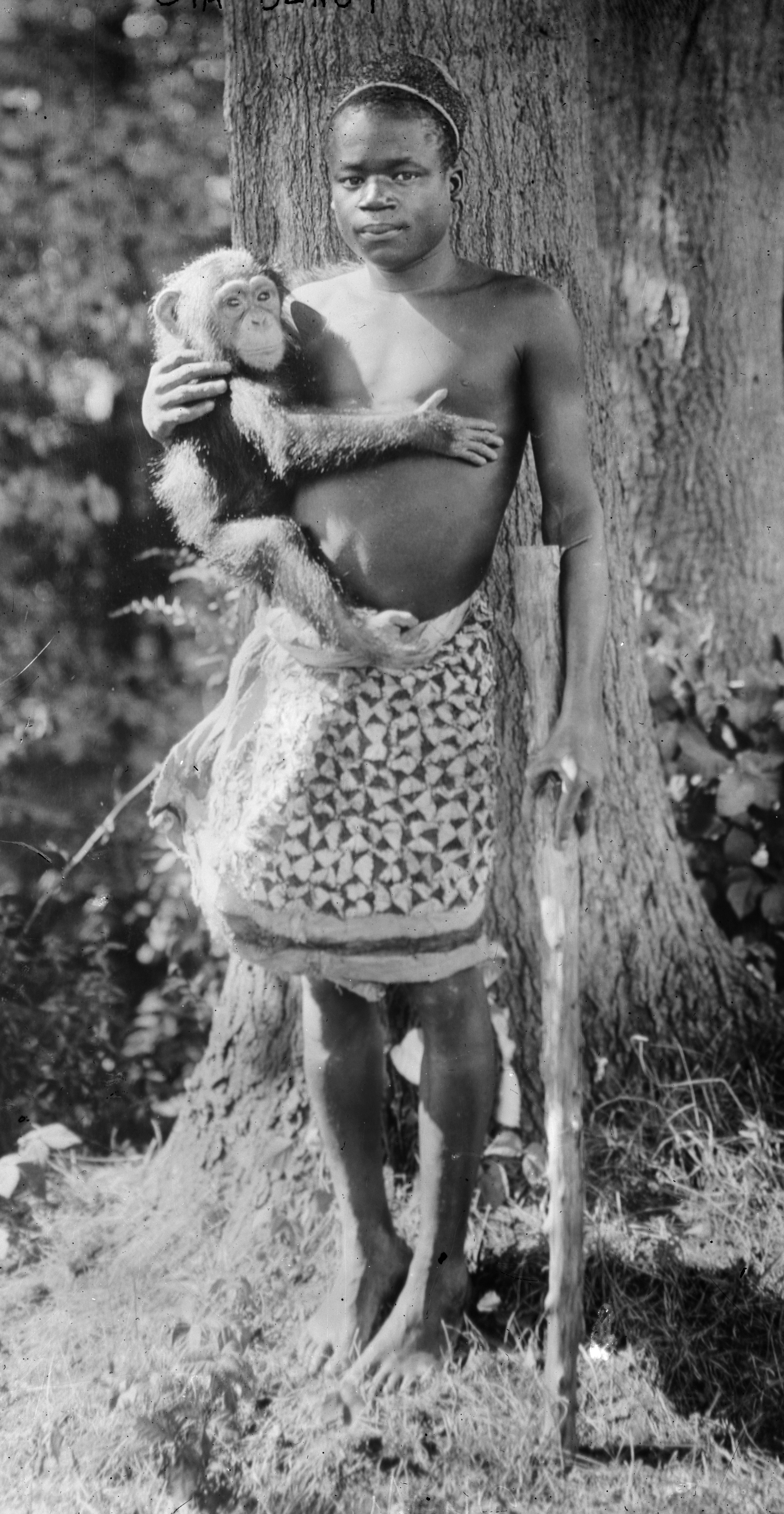
Ota Benga at the Bronx Zoo in 1906. Only five promotional photos exist of Benga's time here, none of them in the Monkey House; cameras were not allowed.

In 1906, Ota Benga, a man from the Mbuti pygmy ethnic group, was brought to the zoo by the American businessman and explorer Samuel Phillips Verner, and displayed there as an exhibit, though he was allowed to roam the grounds freely. He became fond of an orangutan named Dohong, "the presiding genius of the Monkey House", who had been taught to perform tricks and imitate human behavior. The events leading to his "exhibition" alongside Dohong were gradual. Benga spent some of his time in the Monkey House exhibit, where the zoo encouraged him to hang his hammock and to shoot his bow and arrow at a target. On the first day of the exhibit, September 8, 1906, visitors found Benga in the Monkey House. Soon, a sign on the exhibit read:

The African Pigmy, "Ota Benga."

Age, 23 years. Height, 4 feet 11 inches.
Weight, 103 pounds. Brought from the
Kasai River, Congo Free State, South
Central Africa, by Dr. Samuel P. Verner.
Exhibited each afternoon during September.

Hornaday considered the exhibit a valuable spectacle for visitors; he was supported by Madison Grant, secretary of the New York Zoological Society, who lobbied to put Benga on-display alongside apes at the zoo. A decade later, Grant became prominent nationally as a racial anthropologist and eugenicist.

African-American clergymen immediately protested to zoo officials about the exhibit. James H. Gordon said, "Our race, we think, is depressed enough, without exhibiting one of us with the apes ... We think we are worthy of being considered human beings, with souls." Gordon also thought the exhibit was hostile to Christianity and a promotion of Darwinism: "The Darwinian theory is absolutely opposed to Christianity, and a public demonstration in its favor should not be permitted." A number of clergymen backed Gordon. In defense of the depiction of Benga as a lesser human, an editorial in The New York Times suggested:

We do not quite understand all the emotion which others are expressing in the matter ... It is absurd to make moan over the imagined humiliation and degradation Benga is suffering. The pygmies ... are very low in the human scale, and the suggestion that Benga should be in a school instead of a cage ignores the high probability that school would be a place ... from which he could draw no advantage whatever. The idea that men are all much alike except as they have had or lacked opportunities for getting an education out of books is now far out of date.

Benga was allowed to roam the grounds of the zoo. In response to the situation, as well as verbal and physical prods from the crowds, he became more mischievous and somewhat violent. Around this time, Rev. Dr. R. MacArthur of Calvary Baptist Church, was quoted in The New York Times saying: "It is too bad that there is not some society like the Society for the Prevention of Cruelty to Children. We send our missionaries to Africa to Christianize the people, and then we bring one here to brutalize him." Soon, the zoo removed Benga from the grounds. Toward the end of 1906, Benga was released into Reverend Gordon's custody. Gordon placed Benga in the Howard Colored Orphan Asylum, a church-sponsored orphanage in Brooklyn that Gordon supervised. As the unwelcome press attention continued, in January 1910, Gordon arranged for Benga's relocation to Lynchburg, Virginia, where he lived with the family of Gregory W. Hayes. While there, Benga received tutoring from Lynchburg-based Harlem Renaissance poet Anne Spencer.

Benga committed suicide in 1916 at the age of 32. In 2020, WCS apologized for the zoo's treatment of Benga and promotion of eugenics.

== Entrances (gates) ==
- Asia Gate (walk in) Boston Road
- Bronx River Parkway Gate (parking)
- Fordham Road Gate (parking)
- Southern Boulevard Gate (parking)

== In popular culture ==
During the 1980s, some well known celebrities including British naturalist David Attenborough, Superman actor Christopher Reeve, and Muppets creator Jim Henson visited the Bronx Zoo for special programs, mostly dedicated to helping teenagers and children alike learn about animals.

In 2013, So What? Press published an issue of its comic series Tales of the Night Watchman, entitled "The Night Collector", about a coven of vampires that takes over the bat exhibit at the Bronx Zoo. A zookeeper who specializes in bats is put at odds with his co-worker when it is discovered that the woman of their mutual affection has been turned into a vampire. It was written by Dave Kelly and illustrated by Lee Knox Ostertag.

In March 2016, Animal Planet announced plans to produce a docu-series about the zoo, titled The Zoo. The series was produced by Left/Right Productions and premiered on February 18, 2017 and gained a second season in March 2018.

== Notable people ==
- E. R. Sanborn (1869–1947), first official photographer
