= Carrie Allen McCray =

American writer

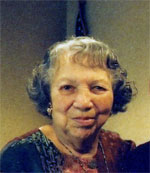
- Born: October 4, 1913; Lynchburg, Virginia, United States
- Died: July 25, 2008 (aged 94); Columbia, South Carolina, United States
- Education: Talladega College, B.A. 1935; New York University M.A. 1955
- Occupation: Writer

Carrie Allen McCray (October 4, 1913 – July 25, 2008) was an African-American writer. She was from Lynchburg Virginia and became the first board of directors of the South Carolina Writers Workshop.

== Early and family life ==
Carrie Allen was born in Lynchburg, Virginia, October 4, 1913, and raised in that city, where she came to know poet Anne Spencer, a friend of her mother. Initially educated at the Virginia Seminary Primary School, she was the ninth of ten children. Her father, William Patterson Allen, was a lawyer. One of her major influences noted in her reflection was her mother. Mary Rice Hayes Allen, was a college teacher at the Virginia Seminary and College, a historically black institution now known as Virginia University of Lynchburg. She Served as its president from 1906 to 1908 after the death of her husband, Gregory W. Hayes. He led the seminary as president until his death in 1906. When Carrie was 8 years old, her parents moved the family to Montclair, New Jersey where various black intellectuals visited, including the poet Langston Hughes. Carrie attended Spaulding Elementary School, Hillside Junior High, and Montclair High School. She received her bachelor of arts degree from Talladega College in 1935 and her master's degree in social work from New York University in 1955. In one of her reflections mentioned how her most memorable experiences, which was during the sixties helping to organize grass roots organizations in Talladega, Alabama, "first Pullim Street Center, then Community Life Institute."

Meanwhile, in 1940 she married Winfield Scott Young, and they had a son, Winfield Scott Young Jr., before the marriage ended in divorce in 1945. She later married John H. McCray, a Florida-born journalist and civil and political rights activist in South Carolina, and moved to Columbia, South Carolina by 1986. Her second husband organized the Black Progressive Democratic Party after World War II and claimed victory for electing moderate Olin Johnson over segregationist Strom Thurmond during Massive Resistance in the 1960s.

== Involvement and organizations ==
McCray attended both Talladega College and New York University, with that she joined NAACP and Alpha Kappa Alpha sorority. Along with the South Carolina Writers Workshop; Board Governors of the South Carolina Academy of Authors.

== Career ==
McCray wrote about the racial and gender tensions she experienced, including frightening telephone calls the Allen family received after moving into a white neighborhood in New Jersey, and her travels in the South in the 1960s with Indira, an Indian friend, particularly visiting a cousin at Auburn University. She mentioned in an interview that when she was seven then and her father was receiving frightening calls and had been warned about a possible cross-burning. Her mother, who bought her books of the Harlem Renaissance poets and Anne Spencer the poet were her greatest influences in relation to writing. McCray always thought of herself as a teacher and social worker, but always loved to write. McCray took up writing seriously beginning when she was 73 years old, and in addition to encouraging younger writers, taught poetry workshops in elementary schools. She was a member of the first board of directors of the South Carolina Writers Workshop, and the namesake for its literary award. She was also a member of the Board of Governors of the South Carolina Academy of Authors.

Her published works include Ajös Means Goodbye (1966) and The Black Woman and Family Roles (1980). Her memoir, Freedom’s Child: The Life of a Confederate General’s Black Daughter (1998) describes her return to Lynchburg to seek out her family history, as well as stories of her grandfather, CSA General (and later Virginia probate official) John R. Jones. Her poems appeared in such magazines as Ms. and The River Styx. Ota Benga Under My Mother's Roof was her last collection of poems (edited by Kevin Simmonds) and published by University of South Carolina Press. Ota Benga was a pygmy tribal member and former slave from Africa who had been put on exhibition as an anthropological exhibit before being brought to the Virginia Seminary in Lynchburg by its president Gregory W. Hayes and who lived with the family until Ota's death in 1916.Carrie’s mother, Mary Rice Hayes Allen, was among those protesting this abominable treatment and took Ota into her home. Carrie was a little girl at the time but the tragedy of Ota Benga stuck with her and now lives in her provocative and poignant poem. In October 2007, a theatrical adaptation of the collection (with original music by Simmonds) debuted at the Columbia Museum of Art, with McCray as narrator.

== Death and legacy ==
McCray died on July 25, 2008, aged 94. However, Carrie Allen McCray did not pass without leaving her legacy behind. She inspired other writers including many from the Harlem Renaissance, to simply start writing without worrying about others opinions. She encouraged new writers to publish their works with the understanding that perfection is unattainable and that they will receive valuable feedback from fellow authors. McCray has been published in articles and magazines such as The Squaw Review, Ms. Magazine, and River Styx and has also been anthologized in Moving Beyond Words (1994) and The Crimson Edge: Older Women Writings (1996).
