= Virginia University =

Virginia University could refer to one of several universities in the Commonwealth of Virginia, a state in the southern United States:

- Virginia University of Lynchburg, a historically black university in Lynchburg
- University of Virginia, a public research university in Charlottesville

== See also ==
- Virginia Polytechnic Institute and State University, known as Virginia Tech, a public land grant polytechnic university in Blacksburg
