= Pierce Street Historic District =

Historic district in Virginia, United States

- U.S. National Register of Historic Places
- U.S. Historic district
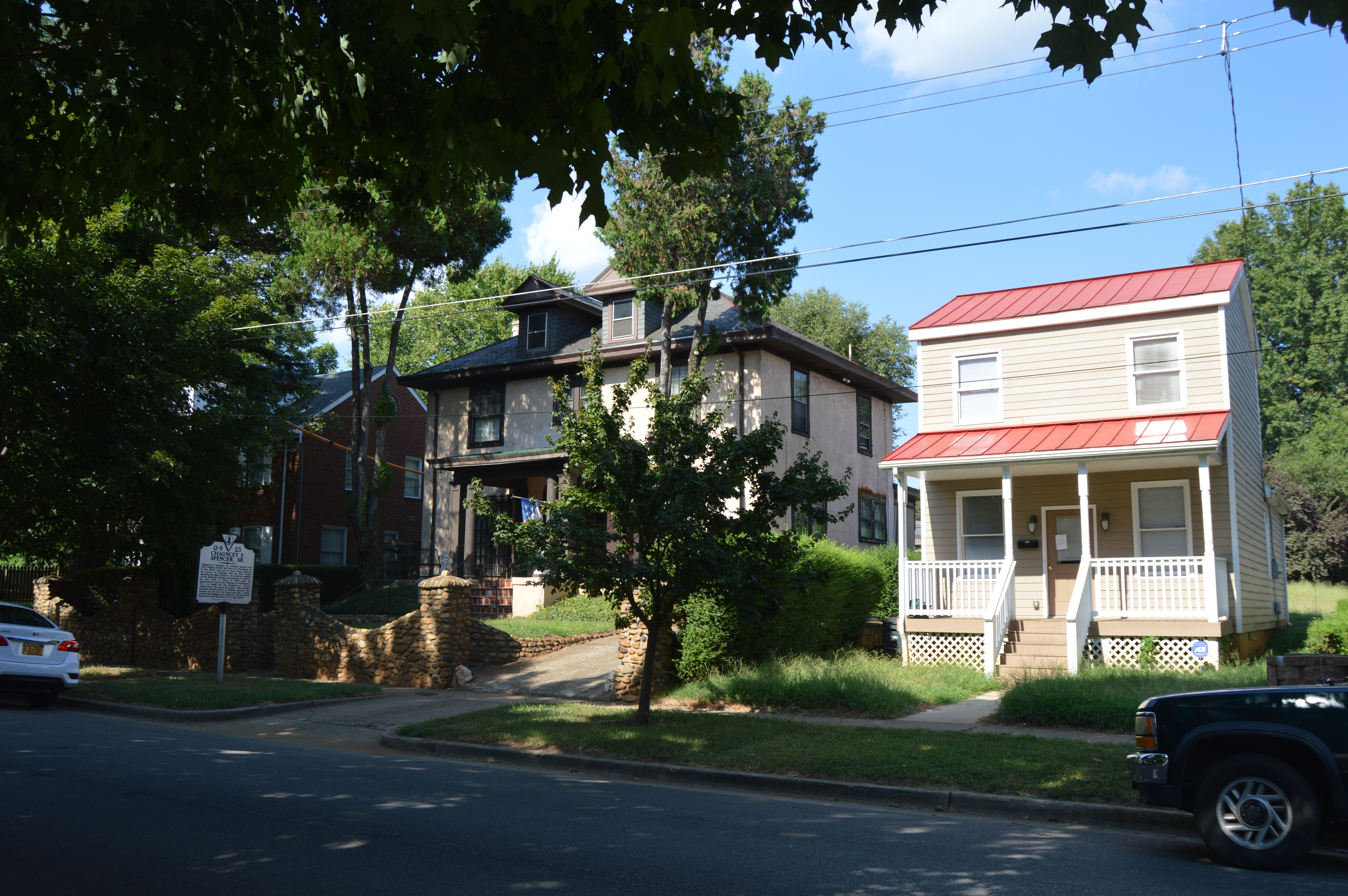
- Pierce Street south of Thirteenth Street

- Location within Virginia Location within the United States
- Location: 1300-1400 blocks of Pierce Street, 1300 block (odd numbers) of Fillmore Street, 1300 block (even numbers) of Buchanan Street, Lynchburg, Virginia
- Coordinates: 37°24′14″N 79°9′6″W
- Area: 5 acres (2.0 ha)
- Architect: multiple
- NRHP reference No.: 14000527
- Added to NRHP: August 25, 2014

The Pierce Street Historic District is a residential historic district in Lynchburg, Virginia, United States. The district consists of two blocks of Pierce Street and one adjoining block each of Fillmore and Buchanan Streets. The area consists of mostly vernacular houses with some folk Victorian and Craftsman styling. Most of this housing stock was built before 1950.

The neighborhood developed as a black residential district to the south of Lynchburg's business district. Several notable black intellectuals lived in the neighborhood, including Anne Spencer.

The district was listed on the National Register of Historic Places in 2014. The designation was given based on the based on the National Register's criterion B "Properties that are associated with the lives of persons significant in our past." The Anne Spencer House and the Dr. Robert Walter Johnson House and Tennis Court are separately listed on the National Register.

== See also ==
- National Register of Historic Places listings in Lynchburg, Virginia
