= List of Virginia Union Panthers head football coaches =

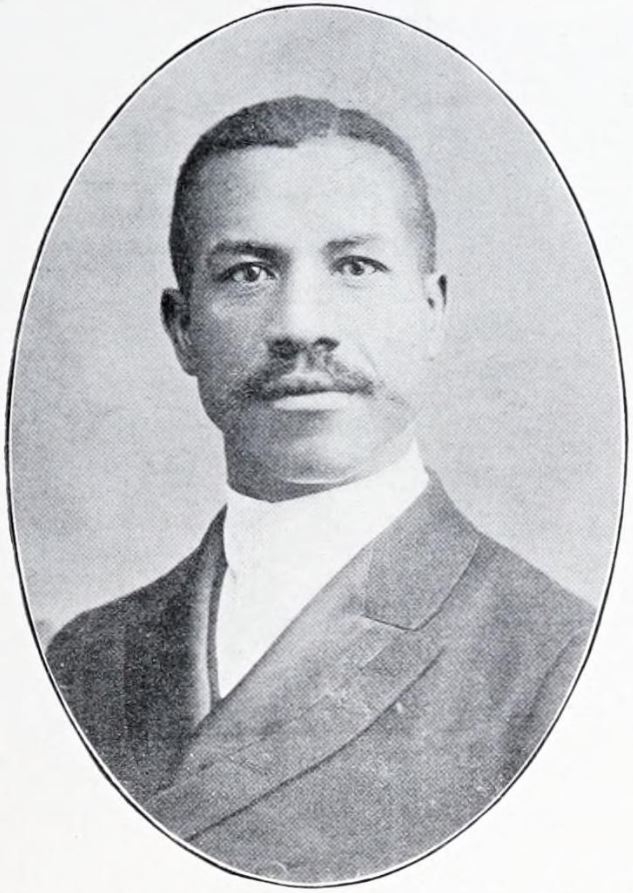
First head coach James Robert Lincoln Diggs

The Virginia Union Panthers football team represents Virginia Union University in college football. The team competes at the NCAA Division II level as a member of the Central Intercollegiate Athletic Conference (CIAA). The program has had 24 head coaches since it began to play during the 1899 college football season. Since the start of the 2018 season, Alvin Parker has served as head coach of the Panthers.

== Key ==
Key to symbols in coaches list
General		Overall		Conference		Postseason (Note: Although the first Rose Bowl Game was played in 1902, it has been continuously played since the 1916 game, and is recognized as the oldest bowl game by the NCAA. "—" indicates any season prior to 1916 when postseason games were not played.)	
No.	Order of coaches (Note: A running total of the number of head coaches, with coaches who served separate tenures being counted only once. Interim head coaches are represented with "Int" and are not counted in the running total. "—" indicates the team played but either without a coach or no coach is on record. "X" indicates an interim year without play.)	GC	Games coached	CW	Conference wins	PW	Postseason wins
DC	Division championships	OW	Overall wins	CL	Conference losses	PL	Postseason losses
CC	Conference championships	OL	Overall losses	CT	Conference ties	PT	Postseason ties
NC	National championships	OT	Overall ties (Note: Overtime rules in college football were introduced in 1996, making ties impossible in the period since.)	C%	Conference winning percentage		
†	Elected to the College Football Hall of Fame	O%	Overall winning percentage (Note: When computing the win–loss percentage, a tie counts as half a win and half a loss.)				

== Coaches ==
List of head football coaches showing season(s) coached, overall records, conference records, postseason records, championships and selected awards
No.	Name	Season(s)	GC	OW	OL	OT	O%	CW	CL	CT	C%	PW	PL	DC	CC	NC
1	James Robert Lincoln Diggs	1900–1901	6	3	3	0	0.500	–	–	–	–	–	–	–	–	–
2	Frank C. Dickey	1902	2	1	1	0	0.500	–	–	–	–	–	–	–	–	–
3	Henry E. Barco	1903, 1911–1912	8	2	5	1	0.313	–	–	–	–	–	–	–	–	–
4	John W. Barco	1904–1907	15	5	7	3	0.433	–	–	–	–	–	–	–	–	–
5	Wessley A. Stevens	1908–1910	10	2	7	1	0.250	–	–	–	–	–	–	–	–	–
6	James E. Garner	1913–1914	7	4	3	0	0.571	0	3	0	.000	–	–	–	–	–
7	S. M. F. Fisher	1915–1916	9	5	4	0	0.556	1	4	0	0.200	–	–	–	–	–
8	Wesley A. Daniel	1917	4	4	0	0	1.000	2	0	0	1.000	–	–	–	–	–
9	H. L. Harris	1918	2	1	0	1	0.750	1	0	1	0.750	–	–	–	–	–
10	Henry B. Hucles	1919–1920, 1926–1942	161	92	51	18	0.627	70	44	16	0.600	–	–	–	–	–
11	Harold D. Martin	1921–1923	22	17	2	3	0.841	11	1	0	0.917	–	–	–	2 CIAA (1921, 1923)	1 black national championship (1923)
12	Thomas W. Harvey	1924–1925	14	7	4	3	0.607	6	4	2	0.583	–	–	–	–	–
13	Sam B. Taylor	1945–1948	37	19	17	1	0.527	11	18	1	0.383	–	–	–	–	–
14	Bernard Smith	1949	8	0	8	0	.000	0	7	0	.000	–	–	–	–	–
15	Thomas Harris	1950–1970	186	98	83	5	0.540	86	77	4	0.527	–	–	–	–	–
16	Willard Bailey	1971–1983, 1995–2003	236	157	73	6	0.678	111	44	5	0.709	0	5	3 CIAA Northern Division (1981–1983); 3 CIAA Eastern Division (2000–2001, 2003)	6 CIAA (1973, 1979, 1981–1983, 2001)	–
17	Joe Taylor	1984–1991	82	60	19	3	0.750	39	12	2	0.755	0	3	2 CIAA Northern Division (1986, 1990)	1 CIAA (1986)	–
18	Richard Macon & Willie Spence	1992	9	3	5	1	0.389	3	2	1	0.583	–	–	–	–	–
19	Henry Lattimore	1993–1994	21	3	17	1	0.167	3	12	1	0.219	–	–	–	–	–
20	Arrington Jones	2004–2007	42	21	21	–	0.500	16	13	–	0.552	–	–	1 CIAA Eastern Division (2007)	–	–
21	Gregory Richardson	2008	10	5	5	–	0.500	3	4	–	0.429	–	–	–	–	–
22	Michael Bailey	2009–2013	50	22	28	–	0.440	17	18	–	0.486	–	–	1 CIAA Eastern Division (2009)	–	–
23	Mark James	2014–2017	40	26	14	–	0.650	20	8	–	0.714	0	1	–	–	–
24	Alvin Parker	2018–present	79	59	20	–	0.747	42	9	–	0.824	2	4	1 CIAA Northern Division (2023)	2 CIAA (2023, 2024)	–
