= Gregory Hayes =

Gregory Hayes may refer to:

- Gregory Hayes (cricketer) (born 1955), South African cricketer
- Gregory J. Hayes (born 1960/61), American businessman
- Gregory W. Hayes (died 1906), leader in the Baptist community of African Americans in Richmond, Virginia
