= Edwin Gray Lee =

American soldier and Confederate brigadier general

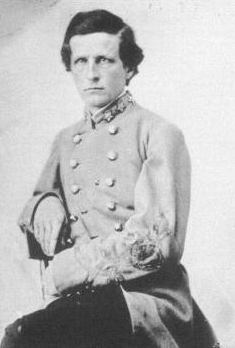
- Born: May 27, 1836; Shepherdstown, Virginia (now West Virginia), US
- Died: August 24, 1870 (aged 34); Yellow Sulphur Springs, Virginia, US
- Burial place: Oak Grove Cemetery, Lexington, Virginia
- Relatives: First cousin once removed of Robert E. Lee
- Military career
- Allegiance: Confederate States of America
- Branch: Confederate States Army
- Service years: 1861–1864
- Rank: Brigadier General
- Nickname: "Ned"
- Commands: 33rd Virginia Infantry
- Conflicts: American Civil War

Edwin Gray Lee (May 27, 1836 – August 24, 1870) was an American soldier from Virginia and a Confederate brigadier general during the American Civil War. He was a member of the Lee family and first cousin once removed of Robert E. Lee.

== Biography ==
Lee was born to Edmund Jennings Lee II and Henrietta Bedinger at their home Bedford in Shepherdstown, Virginia (now West Virginia). Lee's grandfather, Edmund Jennings Lee, Sr., was a brother of American Revolutionary War General Light Horse Harry Lee. His father was a lawyer and, unlike many of Lee's relatives, stayed out of public life. His father was opposed to Virginia seceding from the United States.

Lee attended the College of William and Mary for two years, 1851-1853 and then was a student Benjamin Hallowell's school for young men in Alexandria, Virginia. After completing his work at Hollowell's in June 1855. From 1857-1859 he studied at the law school operated by John White Brockenbrough. Lee received his law degree in 1859 from the school, which in 1866 became part of Washington College.

Edwin married Susan Pendleton, daughter of Confederate General William N. Pendleton on November 17, 1859. They had no children.

During the Civil War, he initially served as an aide to Col. Thomas J. Jackson, and was at the First Battle of Bull Run, was in Jackson's Valley Campaign of 1862, the Seven Days Battles, Second Battle of Bull Run, and Battle of Cedar Mountain. He was captured when he slipped into Shepherdstown, West Virginia to see his ailing father. He was taken across the Potomac to General McClellan's headquarters at Keedysville and was later exchanged for a Union officer of equivalent rank held by the Confederates. He returned to Confederate service and was given command of the 33rd Virginia Infantry Regiment, part of the famed Stonewall Brigade. He fought at the Battle of Fredericksburg, and, following health issues, was appointed Colonel on November 12, 1863 on the staff of Gen. Robert Ransom, Jr. in the Richmond defenses, and later in the Shenandoah Valley. He was promoted to Brigadier General on September 23, 1864. and then served with Gen. Rosser in the cavalry in the Valley. In December 1864, he and his wife ran the blockade to Canada on a secret service mission. They remained in Montreal, Lower Canada until the spring of 1866 before returning to Virginia.

Lee died in Yellow Sulphur Springs, Virginia, and is buried in Lexington, Virginia, at Oak Grove Cemetery.

== See also ==
- List of American Civil War generals (Confederate)
