= Frank Trigg (educator) =

American educator, college president (c. 1850–1933)

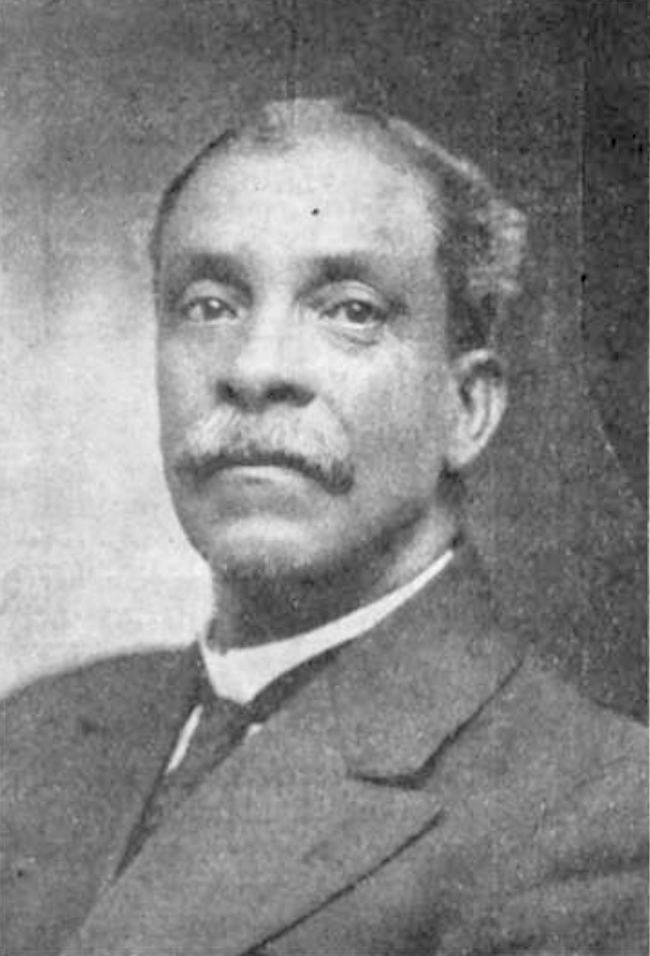
- Frank Trigg (1923)

8th President of Bennett College
- In office 1915 – June 1926
- Preceded by: James E. Wallace
- Succeeded by: David Dallas Jones

Personal details
- Born: Frank John Trigg Jr. c. 1850; Abingdon, Virginia, United States
- Died: April 21, 1933; Lynchburg, Virginia, United States
- Resting place: Old City Cemetery
- Spouse: Ellen Preston Taylor (m. 1879–1933; his death)
- Children: 2
- Education: Hampton Institute

Frank John Trigg Jr. (c. 1850–1933) was an American educator, academic administrator, and college president. He served as the 8th president of Bennett College, a historically black women's college in Greensboro, North Carolina. Trigg was the first black male teacher and the first Black high school principal in the city of Lynchburg, Virginia.

== Early life and education ==
Frank Trigg was born in c. 1850, in Abingdon, Virginia, United States to enslaved parents Sarah Ann and Frank Trigg. Some records described him as "mulatto". He was born enslaved, and owned by John Buchanan Floyd, the 31st Governor of Virginia. Trigg lost his right arm in a threshing accident at age 13. After Floyd's death in 1863, Trigg who now had one arm was inherited by Floyd's son-in-law named Hughes, who suggested Trigg start his education since he could no longer be a physical worker.

In 1870, he enrolled at Hampton Institute (now Hampton University), where he met Booker T. Washington.

== Career ==
After graduation from Hampton Institute, Trigg taught in Abingdon, Virginia from 1873 to 1880. This was followed by a move to Lynchburg, Virginia to teach at Jackson Street High School (later known as Lynchburg Colored High School) for the next 22 years, and where he also served as principal. He was the first superintendent of black schools in Lynchburg.

In 1902, the family moved to Maryland, and Trigg was principal at Princess Anne Academy (now the University of Maryland Eastern Shore) from 1902 to 1910. Followed by serving as principal of Virginian Collegiate and Industrial Institute, a branch of Morgan College (now Morgan State University) in Baltimore, Maryland. Trigg served as president of Bennett College in Greensboro, North Carolina from 1915 to 1926.

The Virginia Teachers' Association for Blacks was co-founded by Trigg. Frank Trigg is discussed in the book, The Afro-American Press and Its Editors (1891) by Irvine Garland Penn; and The Colored American published a “Men of the Hour” profile of Trigg in 1903 praising his innovative education work.

== Death and legacy ==
Trigg died on April 21, 1933 in Lynchburg. He was buried at the Old City Cemetery in Lynchburg.

His son Harold Leonard Trigg (1893–1978) also worked as an educator and college president.

In 2011, a historical marker in his memory was erected by the Virginia Department of Historic Resources (DHR) in Lynchburg. Trigg had lived in a residence at 1422 Pierce Street in Lynchburg, later the home of Dr. Robert Walter Johnson; the house named the Dr. Robert Walter Johnson House and Tennis Court was subject to preservation efforts.
