= Mary Hayes Allen =

American educator (1875–1935)

- Born: Mary Magdalene Rice; March 2, 1875; Harrisonburg, Virginia, U.S.
- Died: October 10, 1935 (aged 60)
- Occupation: educator
- Spouses: Gregory W. Hayes (m. 1895; died 1906) William Allen (m. 1911)
- Children: 10

Mary Hayes Allen was an American educator. She served as the president of Virginia Theological Seminary and College from 1906 through 1908.

== Biography ==
Mary Rice Hayes-Allen was born Mary Magdalene Rice on March 2, 1875, in Harrisonburg, Virginia. She was the illegitimate daughter of former slave Malinda Rice and a former Confederate general, John R. Jones. An educator, administrator, advocate and activist for civil rights, in the fight for racial equality and "full freedom". She was a graduate of Hartshorn Memorial College.

In 1895, she married educator and president of the Virginia Theological Seminary and College Gregory W. Hayes. They had seven children, five surviving infancy.

Gregory W. Hayes was the second president of the Virginia Theological Seminary and College (now Virginia University of Lynchburg) and a prominent leader in the Black Baptist community, especially in the city of Richmond and state of Virginia. He served as president from 1891 until his death in 1906. Mary Rice Hayes, was a teacher at the seminary. She was always very much involved in her husband's work, which prepared her to serve as acting president of the school immediately following her husband's death. Her appointment made her the 3rd president of the institution, and the first African American woman to serve as president of a college in the United States. Mary Rice Hayes served as president of Virginia Theological Seminary and College from 1906 through 1908 when James Robert Lincoln Diggs took over.

In 1911 her name changed to Mary Rice Hayes-Allen, upon her marriage to lawyer William Patterson Allen, with whom she had three children. The couple settled in Montclair, New Jersey in 1920. They sued for racial equality in the local schools, fighting a losing battle to desegregate the Montclair public school. Though their suit laid the groundwork for law suits that would follow theirs that did force the Montclair School Board to desegregate. Mary helped to found a local chapter of the National Association for the Advancement of Colored People (NAACP) in Lynchburg, Virginia in 1913. She then was instrumental in helping to re-establish the chapter in 1918. She was active in the Montclair chapter of the (NAACP) in the 1920s through the 1930s. She served as its secretary, and later as its president, an office she held until the time of her death. Additionally, for 9 years she served as the president for the town of Montclair's colored YWCA. She died on October 10, 1935.

Her daughter, Carrie Allen McCray, wrote a biography of her mother entitled Freedom's Child: The Life of a Confederate General's Black Daughter, which was published by Algonquin Books in 1998.

In 2018, the Virginia Capitol Foundation announced that Hayes Allen's name would be in the Virginia Women's Monument's glass Wall of Honor.
