= Robert Walter Johnson =

American physician

- Born: 16 April 1899; Norfolk, Virginia, U.S.
- Died: 28 June 1971 (aged 72); Lynchburg, Virginia, U.S.
- Education: Lincoln University (Pennsylvania); Meharry Medical College
- Scientific career
- Fields: Internal medicine, sports medicine
- Workplaces: Lynchburg General Hospital

Robert Walter "Whirlwind" Johnson (April 16, 1899 – June 28, 1971) was an American physician, college football player and coach, and founder of the American Tennis Association Junior Development Program for African-American youths, where he coached and fostered the careers of Arthur Ashe and Althea Gibson.

== College football career ==
Johnson graduated in 1924 from Lincoln University, a historically black college in Pennsylvania. He was a classmate of Melvin B. Tolson. Johnson played college football as a halfback at Lincoln and was captain of the 1923 Lincoln Lions football team, which won a black college football national championship. He was selected to the All-Colored Intercollegiate Athletic Association (CIAA) First Team in 1923.

Johnson served as the head football coach at Virginia Theological Seminary and College—now known as Virginia University of Lynchburg–in 1924, Samuel Huston College in Austin, Texas in 1925, and Morris Brown College in Atlanta in 1926. In 1927 he was assistant football coach at Atlanta University in charge of the backfield and ends under head football coach Chief Aiken. Johnson was the manager of Aiken and Faulkner Rent Department at the time.

== Medical career ==
Johnson was the first African-American physician to receive practice rights at Lynchburg General Hospital in Virginia. Johnson continued his medical practice in Lynchburg for his entire career.

== Tennis career ==
Known as the "godfather" of black tennis, Johnson founded an all-expenses-paid tennis camp for African-American children and hired instructors. In these years in the segregated South, they had no public courts where they could learn tennis, and many did not have money for lessons. Johnson was instrumental in encouraging the athletic careers of both Althea Gibson and Arthur Ashe, whom he coached.

== Death ==
Johnson died on June 28, 1971, at a hospital in Lynchburg, Virginia, following a seven-month-long illness.

== Legacy and honors ==
- Johnson was inducted into the Virginia Sports Hall of Fame in 1972.
- Johnson was nominated as a contributor in 2007 for the International Tennis Hall of Fame and was inducted with the Class of 2009.
- His home and training center, the Dr. Robert Walter Johnson House and Tennis Court, was listed on the National Register of Historic Places in 2002.
- The Walter Johnson Health Center, a large medical care and community health education center in downtown Lynchburg, Virginia, was named in his honor.
- The Dr. Robert Walter Johnson Memorial Invitational, Petersburg, Virginia

== Head coaching record ==
=== Football ===
Year	Team	Overall	Conference	Standing	Bowl/playoffs
Virginia Seminary Dragons (Colored Intercollegiate Athletic Association) (1924)
1924	Virginia Seminary	4–4	2–3	5th	
Virginia Seminary:		4–4	2–3		
Samuel Huston Dragons (Southwestern Athletic Conference) (1925)
1925	Samuel Huston	2–4–1	1–3–1	5th	
Samuel Huston:		2–4–1	1–3–1		
Morris Brown Wolverines (Southern Intercollegiate Athletic Conference) (1926)
1926	Morris Brown	3–2–1	2–0–1	2nd	
Morris Brown:		3–2–1	2–0–1		
Total:		9–10–2			
