= 33rd Virginia Infantry Regiment =

- Flag of Virginia, 1861
- Active: Spring 1861 – April 1865
- Disbanded: April 1865
- Country: Confederate States of America
- Allegiance: Virginia
- Branch: Confederate States Army
- Type: Infantry
- Engagements: American Civil War: First Battle of Manassas; First Battle of Kernstown; Jackson's Valley Campaign; Seven Days' Battles; Battle of Cedar Mountain; Second Battle of Bull Run; Battle of Antietam; Battle of Fredericksburg; Battle of Chancellorsville; Battle of Gettysburg; Overland Campaign; Valley Campaigns of 1864; Appomattox Campaign

Commanders
- Notable commanders: Colonel Arthur Cummings; Frederick W. M. Holliday; Brig. Gen. Edwin G. Lee; Brig. Gen. John R. Jones

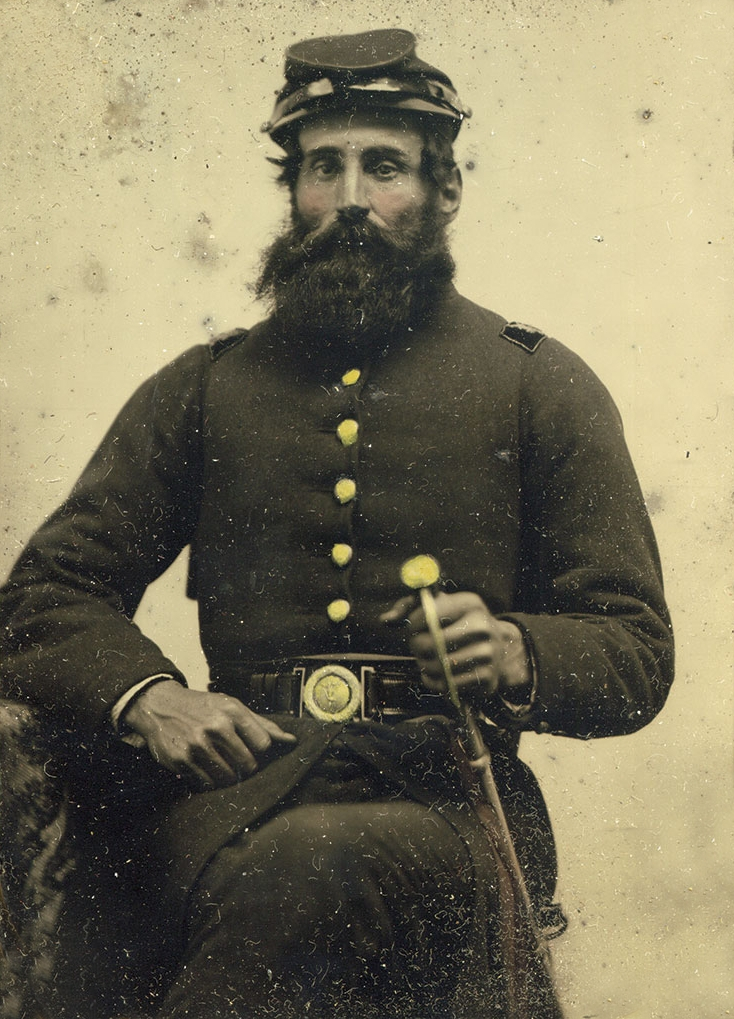
Arthur Campbell Cummings

Captain William H. Powell of Co. A, 33rd Virginia Infantry Regiment

The 33rd Virginia Infantry Regiment was an infantry regiment raised in the Commonwealth of Virginia for service in the Confederate States Army during the American Civil War. It was a part of the famed "Stonewall Brigade," named for General Stonewall Jackson.

== Companies and early statistics ==
The regiment was organized and mustered into service soon after the secession of Virginia on 17 April 1861. It was formed of ten companies, which included men from Shenandoah County, as well as Frederick, Hampshire, Hardy, Page, and Rockingham counties along the Shenandoah Valley. Two of these counties, Hampshire and Hardy, were included in the new state of West Virginia despite having ratified Virginia's secession ordinance and very low voting for the new state. The units gathered at Winchester, and the Potomac Guards and Independent Greys were soon sent out to Romney to counter Federal forces gathered under Lew Wallace at New Creek.

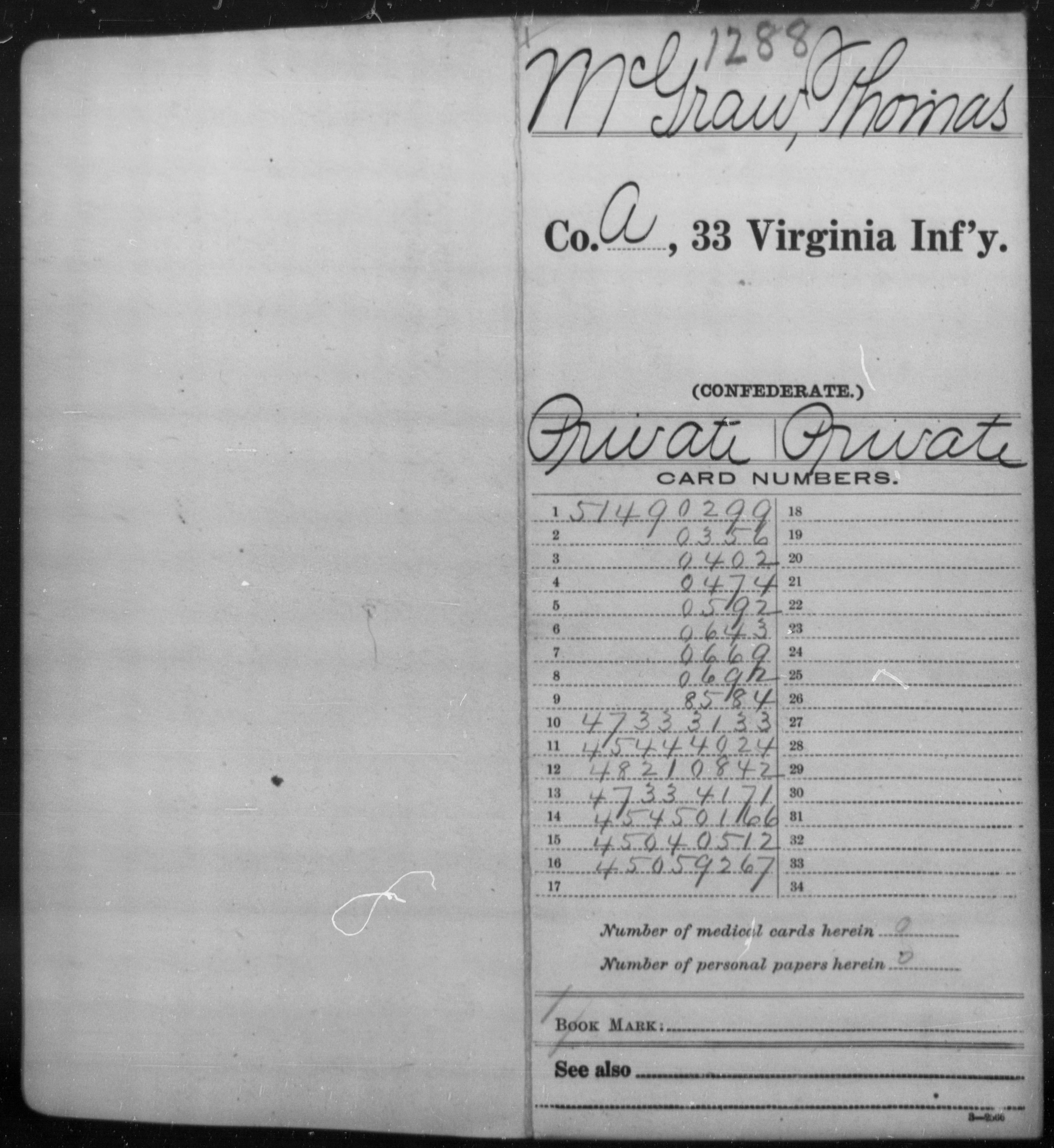
Example of a 33rd Virginia Infantry Regiment volunteer sheet

By late May, the regiment was placed under the commanded of Col. Arthur C. Cummings, a graduate of the Virginia Military Institute who practiced law in Abingdon, Virginia at the far southernmost end of the Valley and would twice represent Washington County, Virginia in the Virginia House of Delegates (first beginning in 1863 and again in 1871). Due to its frequent combat, and resulting injuries, leadership would change hands many times through the war. Other colonels were future Virginia governor Frederick W. M. Holliday, Edwin G. Lee, John F. Neff (died at Second Manassas), Abraham Spengler and John R. Jones (who rose to Brigadier General, as did Ned Lee, but whose conduct became controversial after a severe concussion). John Gatewood, a publisher, had been a member of the Virginia House of Delegates representing Shenandoah County in 1857, and would win re-election during the war, but not win military promotion. The 33rd, along with the 2nd, 4th, 5th, and 27th Virginia Regiments, formed the famous 'Stonewall Brigade' under the command of VMI professor Stonewall Jackson. The average height of a soldier in the regiment was 5'8", and the average age was 25 years; these figures fluctuated greatly as the years progressed.

The 33rd Virginia remained in the Stonewall Brigade in Thomas J. Jackson's Second Corps until the restructuring of the Army of Northern Virginia after his death in the spring of 1863. It was then put under Richard Ewell's command until the spring of 1864, when it dissolved following heavy losses at the Battle of Spotsylvania Court House.

== Companies and officers ==
Sortable table
Company	Nickname	Recruited at	First (then later) Commanding Officer
A	Potomac Guards	Hampshire County	Philip T. Grace
B	Toms Brook Guard	Shenandoah	Emanuel Crabill
C	Tenth Legion Minute Men/Shenandoah Riflemen	Shenandoah	John Gatewood
D	Mountain Rangers	Frederick County	Frederick W.M. Holliday
E	Emerald Guard	Shenandoah County	Marion Marye Sibert
F	Independent Greys/Moorefield Greys/Hardy Greys	Hardy County	Abraham Spengler
G	Mount Jackson Rifles	Shenandoah County	George W. Allen
H	Page Grays	Page County	William D. Rippetoe
I	Rockingham Confederates	Rockingham County	John R. Jones
K	Shenandoah Sharpshooters	Shenandoah County	David Walton

== First Manassas ==
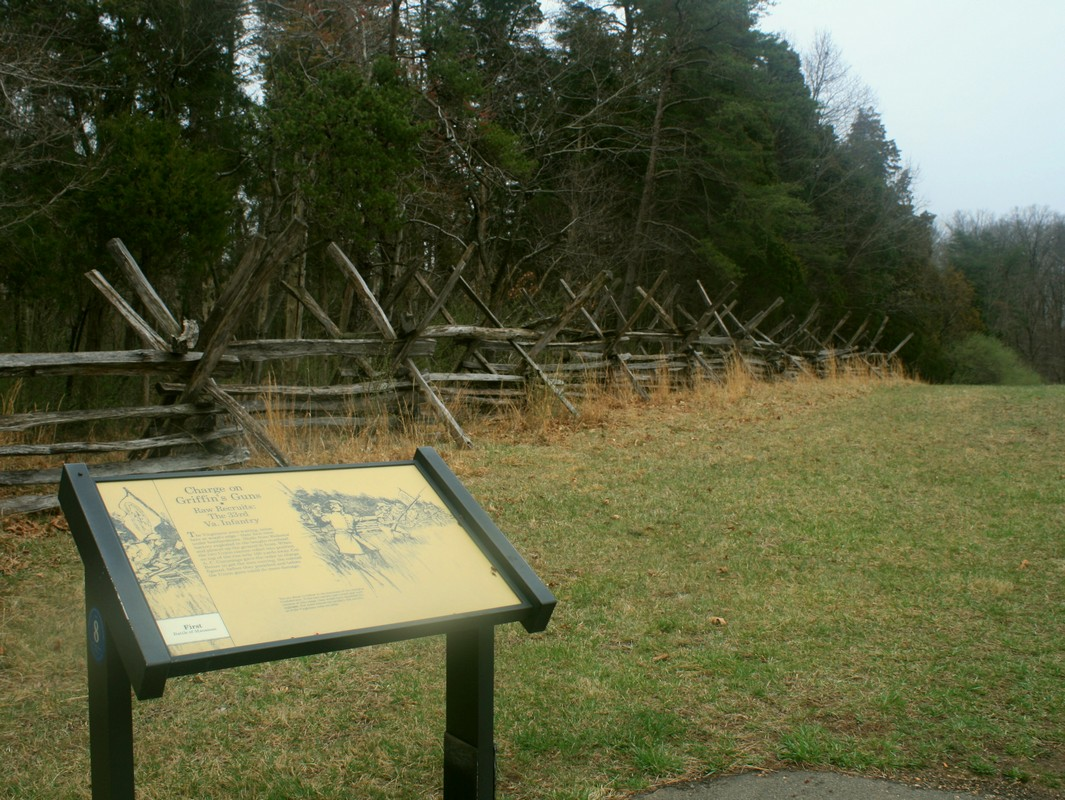
NPS marker "Charge on Griffin's Guns"

When the Union and Confederate armies engaged near Manassas Junction, Virginia, on 21 July 1861, General Jackson and his brigade earned the nickname "Stonewall" when, as they retreated to reform along Henry House Hill, Gen. Barnard Bee cried out to his ailing troops: "There stands Jackson like a stone wall. Rally behind the Virginians!" Eight of the ten companies in the 33rd were present.

At the height of the battle, it was Jackson's first brigade, and more specifically, the undersized regiment of Colonel Cummings that turned the tide of battle with a well-timed charge against an exposed artillery battery. The successful capture of the guns is thought to be largely because, due to the lack of formality in early war uniforms, Jackson's men were dressed in blue, just like their Federal counterparts. Though the 33rd Virginia succeeded in capturing the guns, the number of men that made the charge (only about 250) were unable to maintain possession and were forced to retreat. The charge had halted the steady advance of the Union Army up to that point, and precipitated further charges by Jackson's other regiments. By day's end, the actions of the 33rd led to the complete rout of the Union Army, and played a major role in immortalizing the brigade.

The cost of immortality for Cummings' regiment was high. Of the 450 men who were present at the battle, the 33rd would suffer 43 killed and 140 wounded.

== In the Valley ==
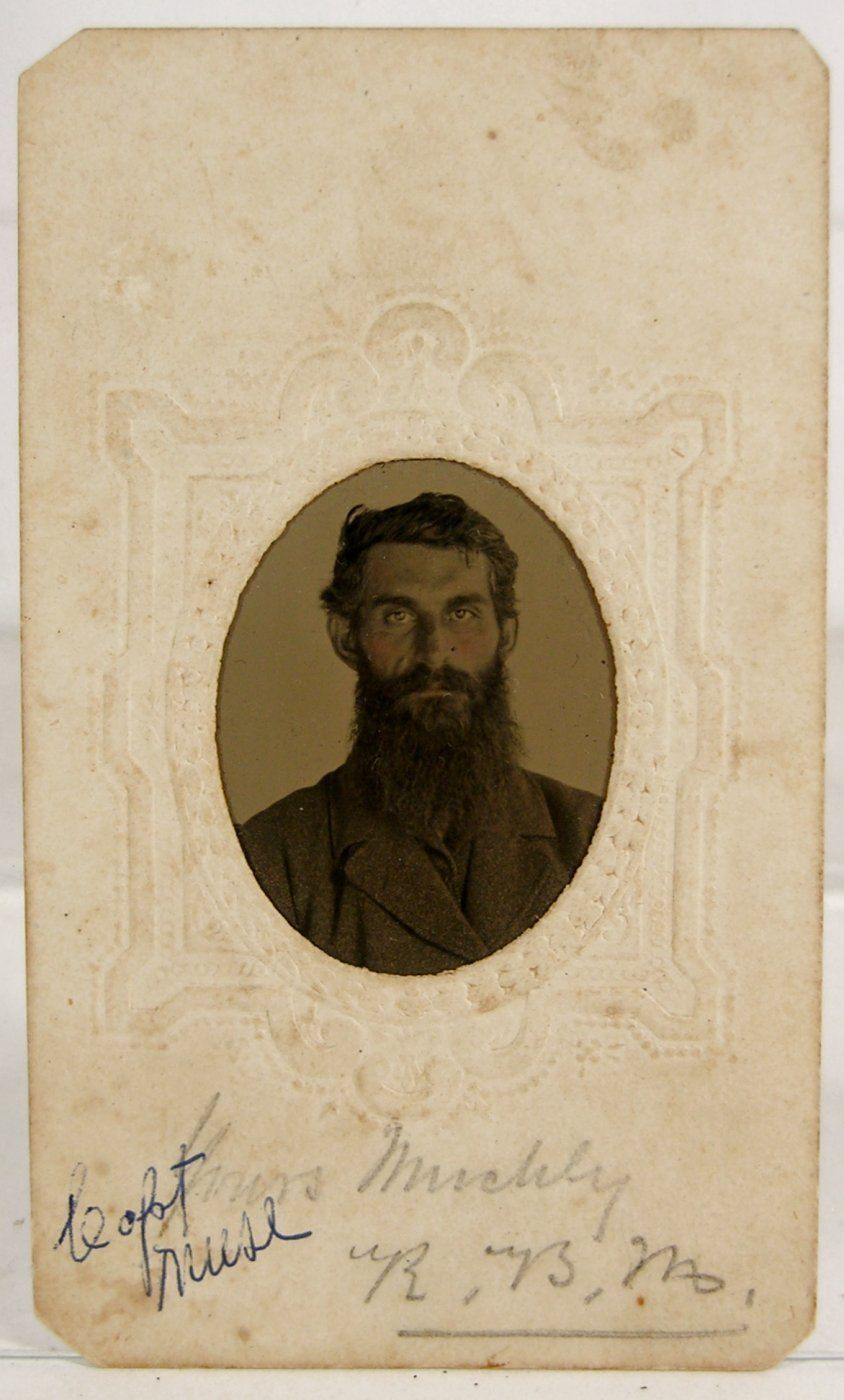
Captain Muse of Company D Mountain Rangers

Three days later, General Jackson took leave of his old brigade and returned to the Shenandoah Valley to take command of Virginia's Valley District. Finding the size of his command inadequate for the task, he petitioned Richmond for the return of the Stonewall Brigade to the Valley. On 9 November, only five days after Jackson left his command, the brigade received orders for them to pack up camp and march to Manassas Junction, where they were expected to board the train and return to the Valley.

Arriving in the evening, it was determined that there were only enough cars to take the 2nd, 5th and 27th Virginia Regiments back. The 4th and 33rd were ordered to encamp at the junction and wait for the trains to return in the morning. Around 10 o'clock, without shelter to protect them, a steady, cold rain began to fall continuing throughout the long night. Having somehow come into the possession of a barrel of whiskey, the Emerald Guard would make it longer yet and twice as miserable for the others present. "The whole of the Irish company gets drunk save a few," wrote a member of Company H, 33rd Virginia, "they get to fighting, in which swords, bayonets and knives are used; have a hard time tying them and putting them in the guardhouse. Several of both parties get badly wounded..."

News of the incident resounded all the way up to General Jackson's headquarters. On 2 December, Jackson, in his official report, provided the following account of the rowdy Irishmen. "... While the Thirty-third Regiment Virginia Volunteers was en route from Manassas to this place one of its companies (Company E) arrived in camp near here without any officer, in consequence of its first lieutenant (T.C. Fitzgerald) having absented himself without leave. In consequence of Colonel Cummings having reported to me that he could not undertake another march with the company, as it was composed of unmanageable Irishmen ..." Two days later, Jackson introduced the men to their new commander (because of his promotion), West Point graduate and U.S. Army veteran Richard Brooke Garnett, although the men had hoped that one of their regimental colonels should have received the promotion. They had several operations in the mountains, including toward Martinsburg, before finally assuming winter quarters near Winchester on 25 January, which they called Camp Felix Kirk Zollicoffer after the CSA General killed at Mill Springs Kentucky on 19 January.

As spring came, so did the Federals in force. Jackson, being forced to evacuated Winchester, headed southwards up the Valley until news from Jackson's cavalry scouts suggested that the Federals, were reducing their force so as to reinforce Union operations further east. Doubling back, Jackson launched an attack against the Federals situated at Kernstown a few miles south of Winchester on 23 March 1862. The 33rd played a large role in holding a stone wall against overwhelming numbers, until being ordered to retire as their ammunition became expended. The regiment suffered 23 killed, 12 wounded and 18 captured of the 275 engaged at First Kernstown.

Following Kernstown, Jackson's Army retreated down the Valley towards Rude's Hill, where, in accordance with various orders issued by the Governor of Virginia and the Confederate Congress, the existing units were reenlisted for a period of three years or the war. New recruits between the ages of 18 and 45 were encouraged through bounty and the fear of being conscripted involuntarily, to join the army. To augment recruiting, state militias were obliged to disband and its members obliged to fill up the ranks of the regular companies. By the end of April, the 33rd Virginia Infantry grew by 297 recruits and with the absorption of the militia, swelled to 762 men before breaking camp on 3 May.

The 33rd Virginia marched with the Stonewall Brigade into the Alleghany Mountains, but the Stonewall Brigade was held in reserve at the Battle of McDowell and was subsequently in the rear of Jackson's column at the Battle of Front Royal. The 33rd would see combat at the First Battle of Winchester, and then the Battle of Port Republic.

== The Peninsula Campaign ==
After a three-day rest near Weyer's Cave, the brigade was again on the move. Crossing Rockfish Gap, Jackson hurried his men towards Richmond to augment the besieged forces around the capital. The Stonewall Brigade arrived in time to assist Robert E. Lee in his counteroffensive against George McClellan. On 28 June, the Stonewall Brigade would participate in the final charge near twilight at the battle of Gaines' Mill, and again would see action near day's end at the Battle of Malvern Hill on 1 July. The 33rd took 32 casualties at Malvern Hill.

From 8 July through 17, the entire brigade left the battlefield and moved to Richmond, where the men were allowed to take a well-deserved rest. On the 17th, however, the men of the Stonewall Brigade again packed their blanket rolls, shouldered arms and began marching northwards for a new campaign, this time against a new Federal Army being organized around Manassas Junction under General John Pope. On 9 August, the brigade would run into Pope at the Battle of Cedar Mountain. The 33rd Regiment fought fiercely throughout the battle, taking 17 casualties.

Two days after Cedar Mountain, the regiment would officially lose one more. Captain Marion Sibert, who, coming to terms with his inability to rejoin the Emerald Guard in the field, resigned his commission as captain on 11 August 1862. Sibert would survive the war without further injury, serving as provost for both Winchester and New Market.

== Second Manassas ==
Continuing northwards, Jackson's men swept away the single brigade of infantry that guarded the vast supply depot at Manassas Junction. Taking all that could be used by the army, it was left to the 33rd Virginia to see that the cars and warehouses were set aflame and otherwise destroyed. On the following day, 27 August the brigade encamped at Groveton, just to the North of the old battlefield. Around twilight, the Stonewall Brigade confronted their equals in the Federal Army, the Iron Brigade, composed of the 2nd, 6th, and 7th Wisconsin Infantry, and 19th Indiana. Both commands would stand in line facing each other well into the darkness justifying their reputations to the other. In the end, the Stonewall Brigade would hold their position on the field. Over the next two days, the regiment would be engaged in the Second Battle of Manassas. The three days fighting would cost the 33rd Virginia 33 killed and 81 wounded, including their Colonel John Neff.

== Antietam (Sharpsburg) ==
Continuing their advance into Maryland, the regiment, now only numbering about 200 men, fought just as tenaciously, suffering 3 killed and 17 more wounded. As the battle resulted in a draw, the Confederate army retreated back across the Potomac and Jackson's army settled in around the lower Valley at which time a number of men, who had been wounded, released from Northern prisons or returned from being AWOL filled up the ranks. By the end of October, the regiment was mustered and paid once more.

== Chancellorsville ==
At the beginning of May 1863, a new Union General, Joseph Hooker led the Army of the Potomac across the Rappahannock River while making a demonstration in front of Fredericksburg, Virginia. Over the next three days, the Battle of Chancellorsville took place. In the thick of the fighting on 3 May was the Stonewall Brigade's 33rd Virginia. Capt. Bedinger of the Emerald Guard (Co. E), taking a moment during a lull in the fighting on 4 May, wrote:

Yesterday we fought the most terrible battle of this war, attacking the enemy in his chosen positions and driving him at every point, our Brigade behaved magnificently, but lost very heavily ... Today we are in line and throwing up breast works, whether we will attack or the enemy retreat further, I cannot say, I'm pretty certain of more fighting. Thank God I am spared to write you this note, tho half of my little company were killed or wounded ...

This battle would have a devastating effect on the Stonewall Brigade and the Confederacy despite the military victory. General Jackson, their beloved leader, had been severely wounded by his own pickets on the night of the 3rd. He lost his arm and within a few days he died from complications. Although General Lee would feel that he had come to lose his right arm with the death of Jackson, Lee prepared to launch his second offensive northwards into Maryland and Pennsylvania. The Stonewall Brigade was now placed under the command of James A. Walker and was placed in the Second Corps, now commanded by Richard S. Ewell. By early June, Lee stealthily pulled his troops out of line and began the trek westward into the Valley and then north towards the Potomac River for the second invasion of the North.

== Gettysburg ==
Within 15 days, the 33rd had crossed the Potomac and were encamped around Chambersburg when the order came for the Second Corps to converge on the Pennsylvania town of Gettysburg. Arriving late in the evening of 1 July, the brigade spent much of the second day skirmishing on the far Confederate left. It would not be until the next day that the 33rd would see real fighting. At 3:00 a.m. on the morning of the 3rd, the regiment was aroused and marched off with the rest of the brigade towards the enemy position atop Culp's Hill. After daybreak, the regiment advanced in line of battle towards the enemy who was "strongly intrenched in a most advantageous position". The regiment advanced up the slopes of the hill advancing "in intervals" as the men took cover behind rocks and trees as they advanced. Although the regiment exhausted its ammunition within an hour or two, at least part of the 33rd remained engaged for almost five hours, as partial supplies were received upon the field. During this portion of the fighting, Captain Bedinger of the Emerald Guard was killed while advancing towards the enemy. Captain Golladay, in temporary command of the regiment after the battle would write that Bedinger's body had fallen perhaps the closest to the enemy's lines.

Sometime around noon, the regiment was withdrawn from the slopes, reorganized and replenished with ammunition. The regiment was then moved several hundred yards to the right, and another advance was made upon the enemy. The fighting was intense and lasted only a half-hour or so before the regiment was withdrawn again and marched to the rear for a short rest until mid-afternoon. Again, the regiment was aroused, reequipped and marched to a position farther to the right of the line. From this time until nightfall, the regiment was only engaged in skirmishing after which the day's survivors quietly retired. Upon the field were left many whom Golladay considered the "flower of the regiment". Twenty-three percent of the 236 men who fought at Gettysburg were killed, wounded, or missing.

On 3 July, the Stonewall Brigade lost one of its former commanders, Richard B. Garnett, who was killed during the infamous 'Pickett's Charge,' possibly due to an injured leg that caused him to ride a horse into the battle.

As Lee began his long retreat in the rain on 4 July and 5, several members of company E and H, some of whom had been wounded two days before, were captured at Waterloo, Chambersburg, and South Mountain. By the time the 33rd had re-crossed the Potomac and moved into camp around Orange Court House, the regiment numbered only 90 men. With the death of George Bedinger and the only Lieutenant, Patrick Maxwell, absent sick, Captain D. B. Huffman of Co. G, 33rd Virginia Infantry assumed temporary responsibility for the shattered Emerald Guard. On 31 August 1863, the 33rd was again mustered to be paid.

== 1864: The Wilderness and Spotsylvania ==
The ill-fated spring of 1864 would begin with news of Union General Ulysses S. Grant's crossing of the Rapidan River. General Lee responded by maneuvering his ever-shrinking army to meet Grant on ground of his own choosing. On 4 May, the Army of Northern Virginia and Army of the Potomac collided in the tangled landscape that sprawled between Fredericksburg, Chancellorsville and Spotsylvania Court House known as the "Wilderness". Fighting raged amidst the broken terrain 4 May–5. Fewer than 100 men remained in the regiment. About 11:00 a.m. on the 5th, the regiment became heavily engaged, taking several casualties.

A slight lull occurred as the repulse of his army caused General Grant to side step Lee in his continual descent towards Richmond. On 10 May, both armies had shifted their positions and Lee had managed to cut off Grant's line of march at Spotsylvania Court House. At 6:00 a.m. on 12 May, the VI Corps of the Army of the Potomac surprised the Second Corps of the Army of Northern Virginia. Overrunning the salient known as the Mule Shoe, many of the brigades under Allegheny Edward Johnson were captured en masse. Among those captured were the majority of the Stonewall Brigade. Though some got away, the brigade effectively ceased to exist as a unit at that point.

== The End of the War ==
What was left of the 33rd Virginia and the Stonewall Brigade would be incorporated with the remnants of several other brigades of Johnson's old division and placed under the overall command of William Terry from the 4th Virginia Regiment. This amalgamated brigade would go on to participate in Early's 1864 Valley Campaign, Hatcher's Run, Waynesboro, Fort Stedman and Lee's final retreat to Appomattox. When Lee surrendered the Army of Northern Virginia to General Grant at Appomattox Court House on 9 April 1865, only 1 officer and 18 men were present from the 33rd Regiment.

The field officers during the conflict were Colonels Arthur C. Cummings, Frederick W. M. Holliday, Edwin G. Lee, John F. Neff, and Abraham Spengler; Lieutenant Colonels George Huston and John R. Jones; and Majors Jacob B. Golladay and Philip T. Grace.

== Current Portrayals ==
Currently, six companies of the 33rd Virginia are reenacted. Co. A., the 'Potomac Guard' is located in Central Indiana, Co. D the 'Mountain Rangers' is located near Winchester, Va, Co. E., the 'Emerald Guard' is located near Washington, D.C., Co. H, the 'Page Grays' is located in Manassas, VA., company G the Mount Jackson Rifles is located in Buffalo NY, and Company C The Tenth Legion Minutemen in Southern California.

A recreation of the flag of the 33rd Virginia can be seen in the opening credits of the movie "Gods and Generals," and the regiment's charge on the aforementioned Union artillery is reenacted.

== See also ==
- List of Virginia Civil War units
- List of West Virginia Civil War Confederate units
