= Anne Spencer House =

Historic house in Virginia, United States

- U.S. National Register of Historic Places
- U.S. Historic district – Contributing property
- Virginia Landmarks Register
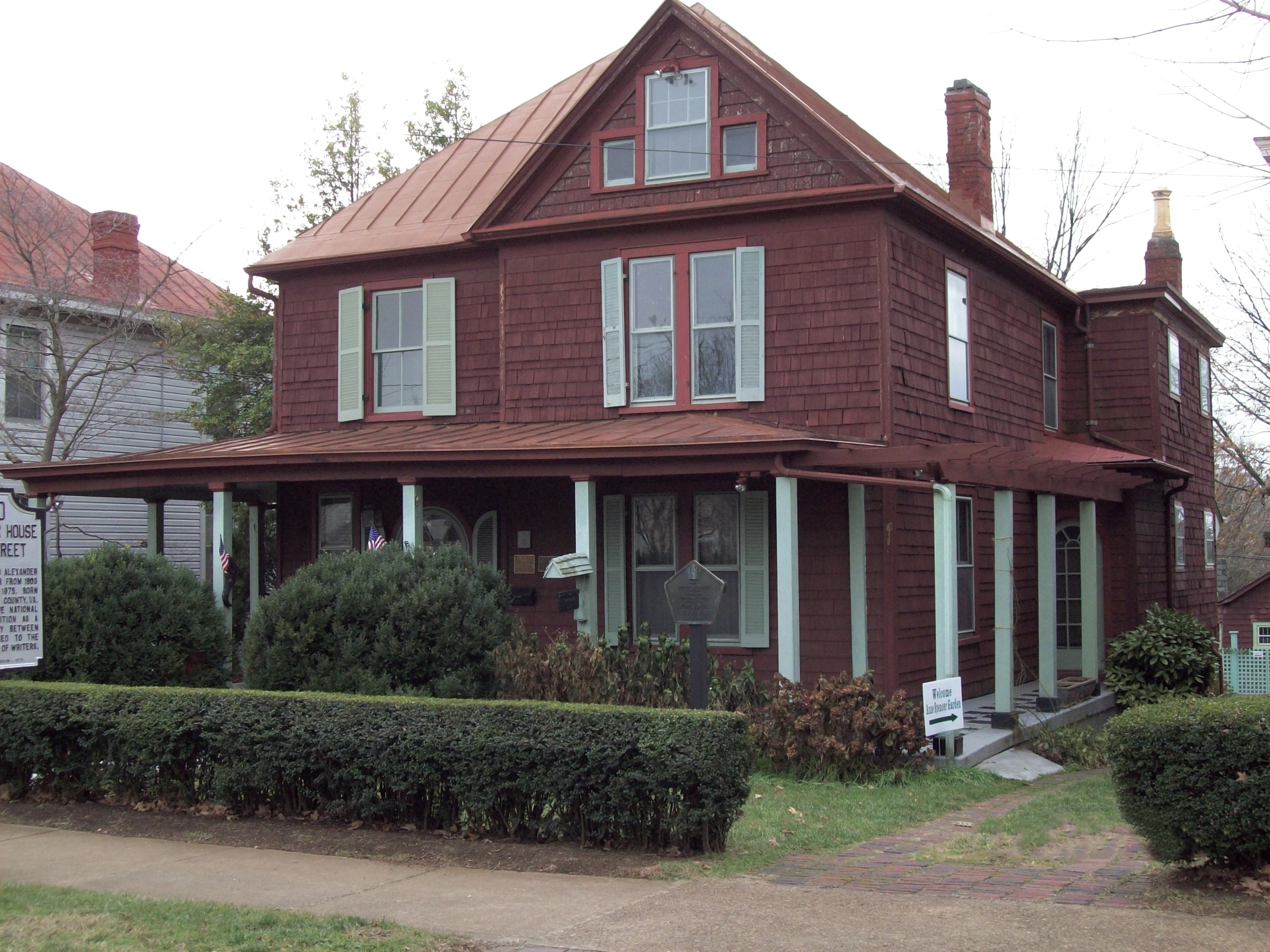
- Anne Spencer House, Lynchburg VA, November 2008

- Location within Virginia Location within the United States
- Location: 1313 Pierce St., Lynchburg, Virginia
- Coordinates: 37°24′13″N 79°9′8″W
- Area: less than one acre
- Built: 1903
- Architectural style: Queen Anne
- Part of: Pierce Street Historic District (ID14000527)
- NRHP reference No.: 76002224
- VLR No.: 118-0061

Significant dates
- Added to NRHP: December 6, 1976
- Designated CP: August 25, 2014
- Designated VLR: September 21, 1976

The Anne Spencer House, in Lynchburg, Virginia, United States was, from 1903 to 1975, the home of Anne Spencer, a poet of the Harlem Renaissance. The house opened as a museum in 1977.

== House overview ==
The Pierce Street House was built in 1903, by Edward Spencer and the surrounding area includes a large garden and a one-room retreat called Edankraal, where Spencer did much of her writing. The word "Edankraal" is a combination of "Edward," "Anne," and "kraal," the Afrikaans word for enclosure or corral. The house is a two-story modified Queen Anne style, shingle residence. Its two-bay facade is divided equally between a recessed section, covered with a hipped roof, and a slightly projecting gable-roofed bay to the right. On the first floor, one can find a living room, dining room, sunroom, front hall, and kitchen. The second floor includes four bedrooms, a full bath, and a sunroom. The third floor, which is not generally open to the public, was originally a "man cave" for Edward featuring a pool table and half bath, but later became another area for the Spencer's grandchildren. The front hall of the house is decorated with mirrors and flowers, creating what the museum calls "a garden of light and colors." The ceiling and arch doorways are lined with crown molding, and a small phone booth is built into one of the corners, beneath the stairs.

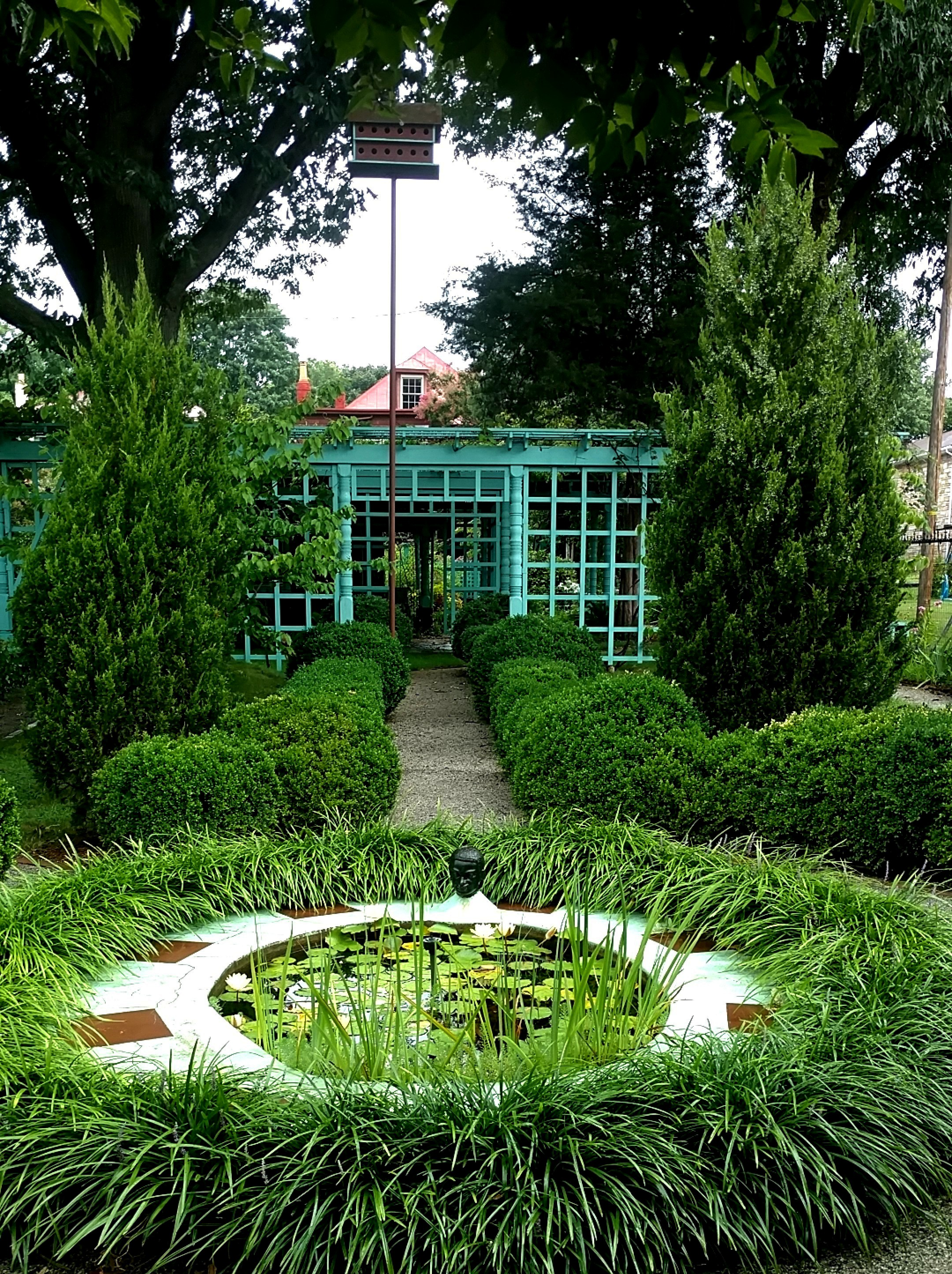
Fountain in the gardens at the Anne Spencer House museum in Lynchburg, Virginia.

The house was modified periodically as the family grew and their social lives expanded. Edward creatively recycled used materials, incorporating windows, doors, handrails, or other cast-off materials into useful components for his home. A screened porch was eventually enclosed as a cozy den, and the lattice from the porch was re-used to make an entry into the garden. Guggenheimer's Department Store in downtown Lynchburg, Virginia had no more use for some sheets of copper that were in a window display. Edward used the copper to cover, shape, and enhance the recessed paneling below the chair rail of the dining room. Bright, red leather, padded doors, originally part of the all-black Harrison Movie Theater on Fifth Street in Lynchburg, Virginia, were re-used in the kitchen and led to a side porch. Massive, oversized banister stair railings were salvaged and re-used in the attic “dormitory room” Edward re-furbished for the visiting grandchildren in later years. He also installed a second bathroom there, which is modestly screened only with a simple hand-drawn curtain.

The house was listed on the National Register of Historic Places in 1976 and opened as a museum on 1977. It is located in the Pierce Street Historic District.

In July 2022, the Anne Spencer House Museum received funding from the National Trust for Historic Preservation's African American Cultural Heritage Action Fund to be use for the purpose of hiring an executive director to oversee programming and restoration projects.

== Spencer in Lynchburg ==
Anne Spencer was the first Virginian and first African-American to have her poetry included in the Norton Anthology of American Poetry. She was also a committed activist for equal rights, and her house also served as a political center of the community. Spencer and her husband Edward had petitioned to start a local chapter of the National Association for the Advancement of Colored People and hosted James Weldon Johnson in their home as he assisted in creating the chapter.

The Spencers entertained other notable figures such as Langston Hughes, Marian Anderson, George Washington Carver, Thurgood Marshall, Martin Luther King Jr., and W. E. B. Du Bois.
