= Dr. Robert Walter Johnson House and Tennis Court =

Historic house in Virginia, United States

- U.S. National Register of Historic Places
- U.S. Historic district – Contributing property
- Virginia Landmarks Register
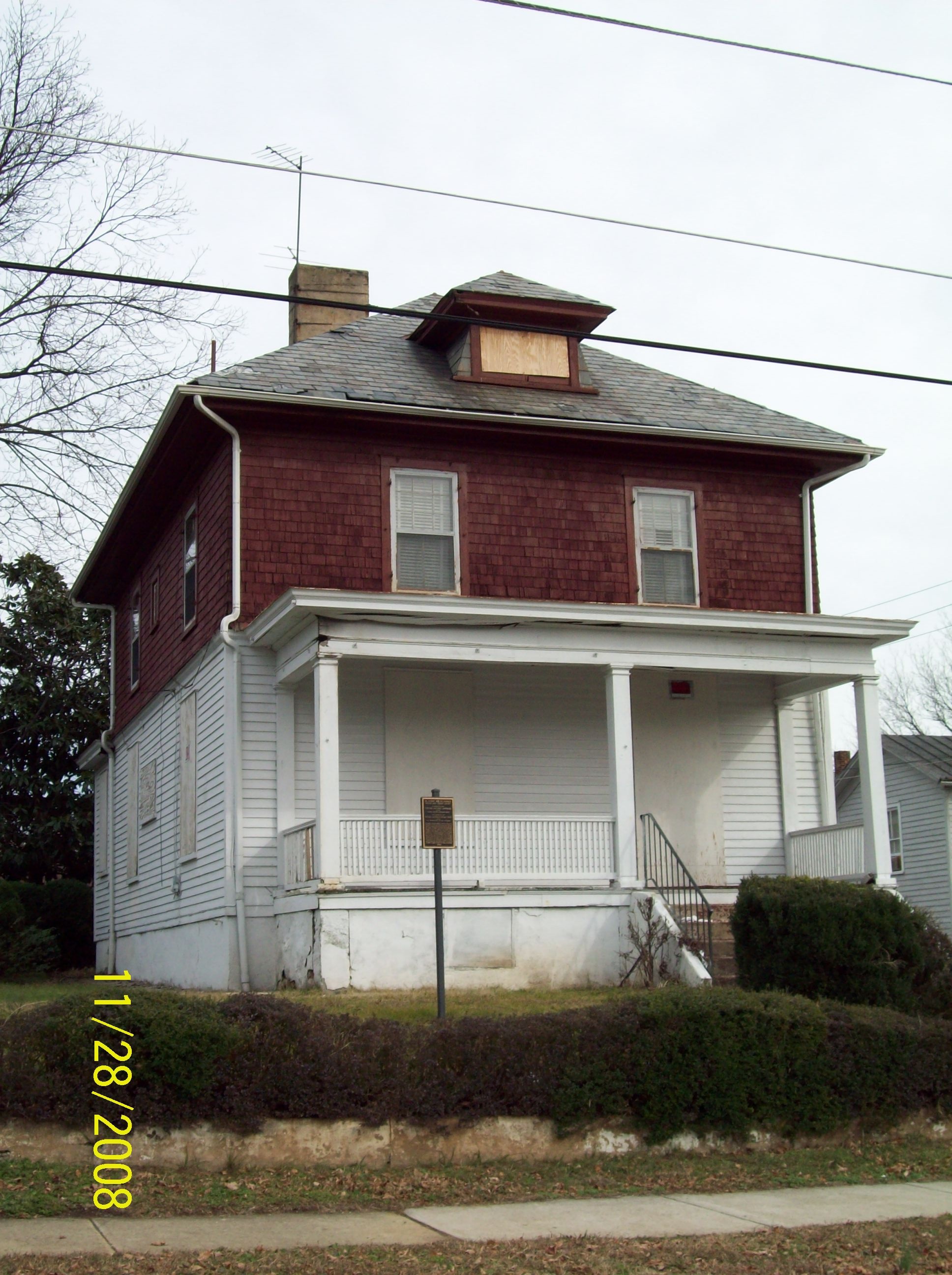
- Dr. Robert Walter Johnson House, Lynchburg VA, November 2008

- Location within Virginia Location within the United States
- Location: 1422 Pierce St., Lynchburg, Virginia
- Coordinates: 37°24′43″N 79°9′2″W
- Area: less than one acre
- Built: 1933
- Architect: McLaughlin, James T.
- Architectural style: Late 19th And Early 20th Century American Movements, American Foursquare
- Part of: Pierce Street Historic District (ID14000527)
- NRHP reference No.: 01001519
- VLR No.: 118-0225-0077

Significant dates
- Added to NRHP: January 24, 2002
- Designated CP: August 25, 2014
- Designated VLR: June 13, 2001

Dr. Robert Walter Johnson House and Tennis Court is a historic home and tennis court in Lynchburg, Virginia, U.S., that was built in 1911 and added to the National Register of Historic Places in 2002. It is located in the Pierce Street Historic District.

== History ==
Frank Trigg (c. 1850–1933), a black educator and college president, lived in the house until his death.

Robert Walter Johnson (1899–1971) was a Lynchburg physician, and the first minority doctor in the entire city to be granted practice rights at the Lynchburg General Hospital. In addition to his work, Johnson was a successful trainer for promising African-American tennis players. His American Foursquare style home, built in 1911, includes an adjacent tennis court on the lot next door.

A successful college athlete, Johnson used his athletic skill and personal funds to found the Junior Development Program of the American Tennis Association during the 1950s. Stressing sportsmanship and discipline, Johnson trained stars such as Althea Gibson and Arthur Ashe, the first African-Americans to ever win at Wimbledon.

The house was also offered as lodging to distinguished African-Americans passing through the city, as blacks were usually denied occupancy from hotels. Guests included the famed Duke Ellington, Jackie Robinson, Lionel Hampton, and Roy Campanella.

The red clay tennis court where Ashe and Gibson mastered their art was last used in 1971, after which it became buried under grass with the net posts protruding to show where the court was. In May 2018, a new green clay court was installed and dedicated on the site.

Despite being on the National Register of Historic Places, the house has fallen into disrepair.
