= John R. Jones (general) =

American Confederate Army general (1827–1901)

John Robert Jones
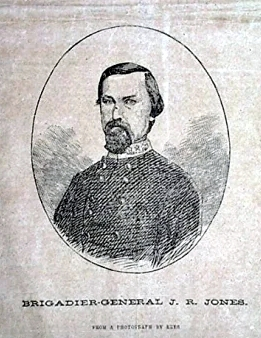

Personal details
- Born: March 12, 1827 Rockingham County, Virginia, U.S.
- Died: April 1, 1901 (aged 74) Harrisonburg, Virginia, U.S.
- Spouse: Sarah Louisa Brashear Jones
- Children: Mary (acknowledged)
- Education: Virginia Military Institute
- Occupation: educator, soldier, probate official

Military service
- Allegiance: Confederate States of America
- Branch/service: Confederate States Army
- Years of service: 1861-1863
- Rank: Brigadier General
- Unit: 33rd Virginia Infantry; 48th Virginia Infantry
- Battles/wars: First Battle of Manassas, Shenandoah Valley Campaign, Seven Days Battles, Battle of Antietam, Battle of Chancellorsville

John Robert Jones (March 12, 1827–April 1, 1901) was a Virginia educator who became a brigadier general in the Confederate army during the American Civil War, during which he twice received severe wounds. After the war, he became a merchant and later served for decades as a commissioner in chancery (probate official) in Harrisonburg.

== Early life and education ==
Born in Rockingham County, Virginia, in the Shenandoah Valley to David Jones and the former Harriet Yost. J.R. Jones had three brothers and three sisters. He graduated from the Virginia Military Institute, then became the principal of a military school in Urbana, Maryland.

He married Sarah Brashear, one of the daughters of Thomas Cook Brashear of New Market, Maryland, but the couple had no children.

== Personal life ==
Three years before his wife's death, Jones fathered a child with freed slave Malinda Rice, who had begun working in their household at age 16. Jones would eventually acknowledge Marie Magdalene Rice as his daughter, as described by her daughter (his granddaughter) Carrie Allen McCray.

== Career ==
=== American Civil War ===
At the outbreak of the Civil War, Jones raised a volunteer company, the Rockingham Confederates, which became Company I, 33rd Virginia Infantry. Initially commissioned as captain on June 22, 1861, he fought at the First Battle of Manassas. On August 21, 1861, he was promoted to lieutenant colonel of the 33rd. He fought in General Thomas J. "Stonewall" Jackson's Shenandoah Valley Campaign in the spring of 1862, under Col. John F. Neff (a Lutheran minister's son and fellow VMI graduate killed in action at the Second Battle of Manassas). Jones was then appointed to command a brigade in the Stonewall Division. He commanded the brigade throughout the Seven Days fighting at the Battle of White Oak Swamp and Malvern Hill, where he was wounded, mustered out and recommissioned.

Jones healed and rejoined the army during the Maryland Campaign and took command of the Stonewall Division, which then captured the U.S. outpost at Harpers Ferry. At the Battle of Antietam, his brigade was one of two on the front line and attacked early on September 17. They held the line for about an hour before partially retreating. However, a nearby shell burst stunned Jones and caused hearing loss, so he relinquished his command to Brig. Gen. William E. Starke, who fell mortally wounded, leaving Col. A.J. Grigsby in command. Following the Maryland Campaign, Jones returned to the Shenandoah Valley, and was tasked with rounding up deserters.

Jones rejoined the Army of Northern Virginia the day before the Battle of Fredericksburg when he returned to command his old brigade. After Fredericksburg, charges of cowardice were levelled against him by several subordinates, who claimed he had used a tree for protection. He was acquitted in April 1863 after a month-long trial, but again charged with cowardice for leaving the Chancellorsville battlefield because of an ulcerated leg. He was never given a field command again and was seized by U.S. troops on July 4, 1863, near Smithsburg, Maryland. He was imprisoned for the rest of the war with no desire by Richmond authorities to affect an exchange.

== Postwar ==
After the war, Jones became an agricultural merchant, and by 1880 a commissioner of accounts (probate official) in Harrisonburg, Virginia, the county seat of Rockingham County.

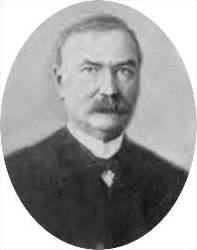
A post war picture of Jones

Although his only daughter, Mary, was raised by her maternal uncle John and his wife, the general continued to employ Malinda as his housekeeper, and often visited. He bought books for Mary and took her to visit her grandmother Martha in Singer's Glen. When his wife died in 1878, Jones sold his house and moved in with the family of his merchant friend Jonas Lowenbach, and also bought a small house for Malinda (who had married her fiancé Caleb Rice) and her children. Nonetheless, his acknowledgment of Mary's paternity had social repercussions for both him and his child. The 1900 U.S. Federal Census shows Jones living with 33-year-old Black female servant Loisa Mills and her three young sons.

== Death and legacy ==
Jones died in 1901. His granddaughter's book about her family secret was published in 1998.

== See also ==
- List of American Civil War generals (Acting Confederate)
