= Anne Spencer =

Poet, librarian and civil rights activist (1882–1975)

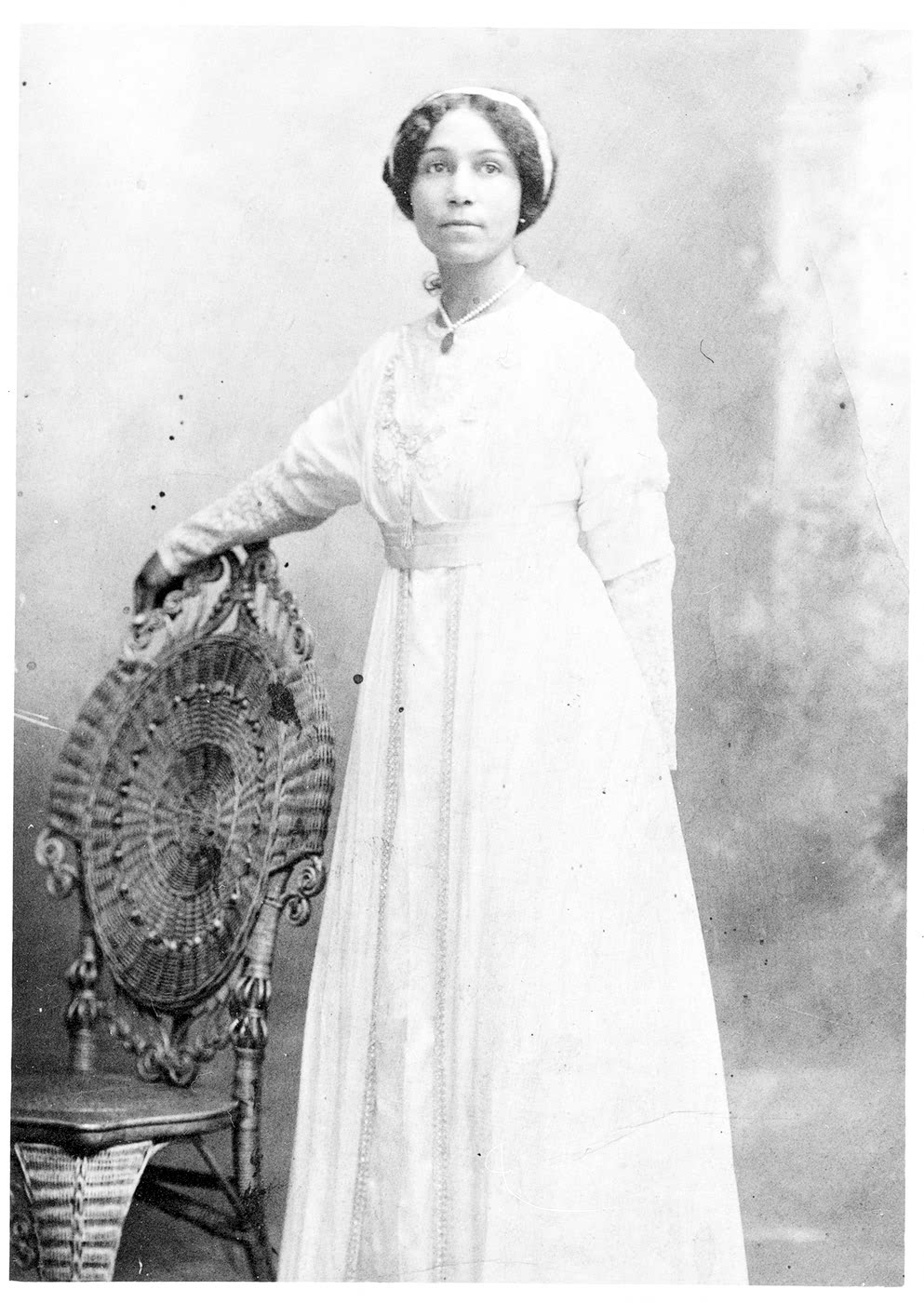
- Anne Bethel Spencer in her wedding dress, 1900
- Born: Annie Bethel Bannister; February 6, 1882; Henry County, Virginia, U.S.
- Died: July 27, 1975 (aged 93); Lynchburg, Virginia, U.S.
- Education: Virginia Seminary
- Writing career
- Genre: Poetry
- Movement: Harlem Renaissance

Anne Bethel Spencer (born Bannister; February 6, 1882 – July 27, 1975) was an American poet, teacher, civil rights activist, librarian, and gardener. She was a prominent figure of the Harlem Renaissance, also known as the New Negro Movement, despite living in Virginia for most of her life, far from the center of the movement in New York. She met Edward Spencer while attending Virginia Seminary in Lynchburg, Virginia. Following their marriage in 1901, the couple moved into a house he built at 1313 Pierce Street, where they raised a family and lived for the remainder of their lives.

Spencer is a widely anthologized poet, and was the first Virginian and one of three African-American women included in the highly influential Norton Anthology of Modern Poetry (1973). As a civil rights activist for equality and educational opportunities, she and her husband Edward, with close friend Mary Rice Hayes Allen and others, revived the chapter of the NAACP in Lynchburg, Virginia, which they were also responsible for establishing in 1913. In association with James Weldon Johnson, the branch became fully active with ninety-six members as of July, 1918. The Spencers' home became an important center and intellectual salon for guests and dignitaries such as Langston Hughes, Marian Anderson, George Washington Carver, Thurgood Marshall, Martin Luther King Jr., James Weldon Johnson, and W. E. B. Du Bois. Anne Spencer also loved her garden and her cottage, Edankraal, which her husband Edward built for her as a writing studio in the garden behind their home. The name Edankraal combines Edward, Anne, and kraal, the Afrikaans word for enclosure or corral.

== Life ==
=== Early life ===
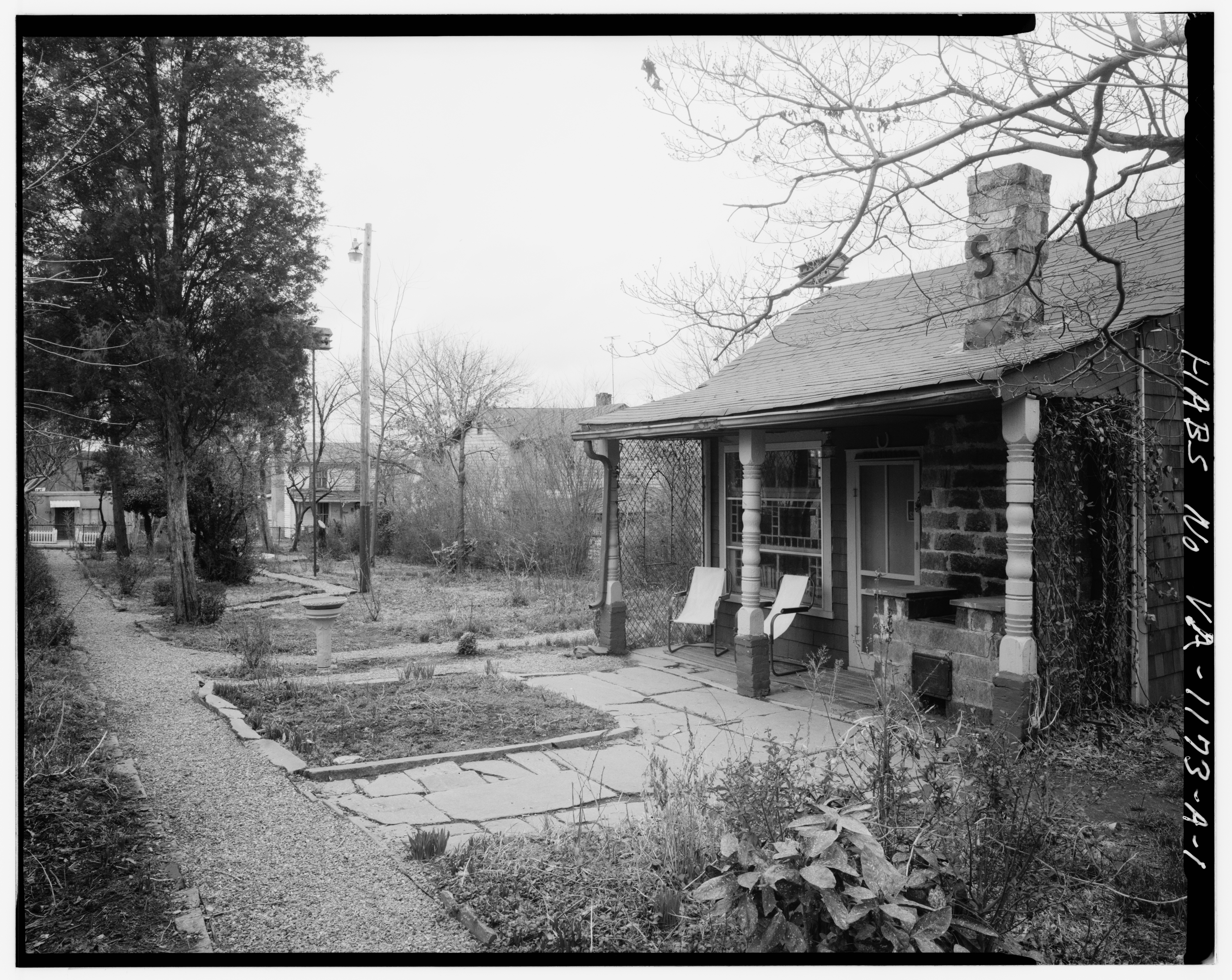
Garden at Spencer's house in Lynchburg

Anne Bethel Bannister was born in Henry County, Virginia, to Joel Cephus Bannister and Sarah Louise Scales, African Americans who were determined to make a better life for their daughter. Her parents worked on a plantation after their marriage. Although her father Joel was born a slave in 1862, Anne's parents were part of the first generation of African Americans whose childhood followed the abolition of slavery. Looking at her previous 5 generations, they were also all enslaved.

As an only child, Anne was the center of her parents' affections, though they separated over differences in ideas about child rearing. After the separation, Anne Bannister was then known as Anne Scales, taking her mother's maiden name. Mother and daughter moved to West Virginia and settled in Bramwell, a town whose acceptance of African Americans and immigrants was unusual for the time. Anne lodged in the home of the Dixie family while her mother worked as a cook at a local inn. William T. Dixie, a proprietor of his own barber shop, his wife, Willie Belle, and their five children, were prominent members of the African-American community.

As a lodger in the Dixie household, Anne did not perform chores or attend school, although she grew up alongside the Dixie children who routinely performed household chores and attended school locally. Sarah Scales was deeply devoted to her daughter, Anne, and she believed the local schools were unsuitable for her. Without the formal structure of education, Anne had an amount of freedom for an African-American child in the late nineteenth/early twentieth century. It was this freedom in Bramwell that would lead to her development as a poet, through her explorations of the natural world and her reliance on the solitude she found in the only private place available to her, the family outhouse. It was there in the outhouse, that Annie, as an illiterate child, would take the Sears and Roebuck catalog and seclude herself, turning the pages, imagining and dreaming herself as a reader. Her childhood in Bramwell proved foundational to her development as a poet and an intellectual. The solitude she found in the Dixie's outhouse would resurface for her as an adult in Lynchburg, with the garden house her husband built for her, called Edankraal, a name derived from the combination of their names, "Edward" and "Anne," and the Afrikaans word for enclosure or corral, "kraal."

Although separated, Anne's parents, Joel and Sarah, continued contact concerning their daughter's well-being. When Joel learned that Anne was not in school, he sent Sarah an ultimatum that Anne must attend school or he would take her back to live with him. Although Sarah believed the local schools were unsuitable for Anne, she learned of the Virginia Seminary at a church meeting. With Joel's ultimatum in mind, Anne was sent to Lynchburg to be enrolled in the Virginia University of Lynchburg (then known as Virginia Seminary) in 1893 when she was 11 years old. Despite her largely illiterate childhood, Anne excelled at the seminary, delivering the valedictory address at her graduation in 1899. Anne would return to Bramwell during breaks and over the summer. After receiving an education at the Normal School of the Virginia Seminary, Anne returned to Bramwell after graduation and taught school in Elkhorn and Maybeury, West Virginia from 1899 to 1901.

=== Into adulthood ===
While at the Virginia Seminary Anne met fellow student Charles Edward Spencer, whom she married on May 15, 1901, at the Dixie's home in Bramwell. In 1903, the Spencers moved permanently to Lynchburg and built a home at 1313 Pierce Street where they raised three children together, two daughters, Bethel and Alroy, and a son, Chauncey Spencer. Chauncey continued his mother's legacy of activism, playing a prominent role of military service during World War II. Chauncey's actions and determination led to the formation of the Tuskegee Airmen and he became a noted member of the group during a time when African Americans were refused military service as pilots.

In the early years of Anne's writing career, she worked at an all Black high school known as the Paul Laurence Dunbar High School for extra income when her children began attending college. At the school, she worked as a librarian from 1923 to 1945. The library consisted of a rather small collection of books, which resulted in Spencer bringing books from her own collection to add to the library.

=== Literary life ===
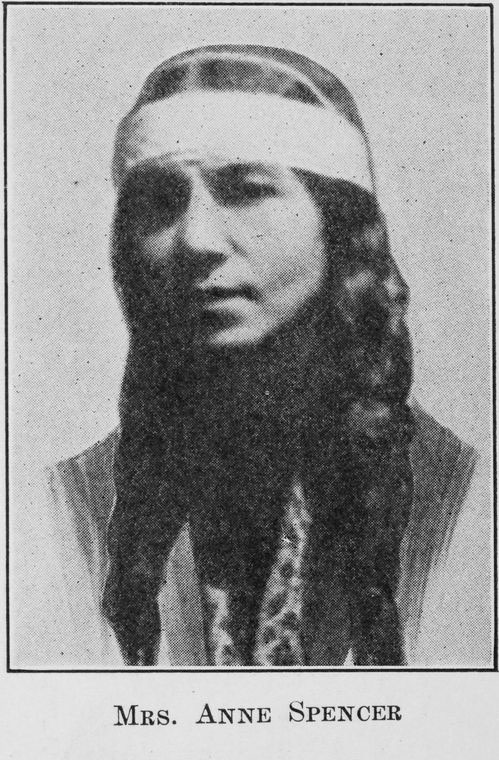
Anne Spencer, circa 1923

Anne Spencer's literary life began while she was a student at the Virginia Seminary where she wrote her first poem, "The Skeptic", which is now lost. She continued to write poetry throughout her life, using any scrap of paper or garden catalogue page that was handy to record her thoughts. Spencer's poems spoke of race, nature, and the harsh realities of the world that she lived in. Her work would go on to be widely anthologized. Spencer's career as a poet began in 1919, when she planned to open an NAACP chapter in Lynchburg. Anne Spencer hosted James Weldon Johnson, a traveling representative for the NAACP. It was during this visit in 1919 that Johnson discovered Anne's poetry, and working through H.L. Mencken, Johnson's own editor, Anne's first poem, "Before the Feast at Shushan," was published in the February 1920 issue of The Crisis. She was 40 years old at the time her first poem was published.

The majority of Spencer's work was published during the 1920s, during the Harlem Renaissance. Her work was highly respected and through her poems she was able to touch on topics of race and nature, as well as themes of feminism. For instance, critics interpret her poem "White Things" to be a comparison of the subjugation of the Black race to the despoliation of nature. Her work was notably featured in Alain Locke's famous anthology The New Negro: An Interpretation, which connected her to the lifeline of the Harlem Renaissance, despite the fact that she lived in Virginia, far from New York. In addition, her poems were included in The Book of American Negro Poetry, which was edited by another figure of the Harlem Renaissance, James Weldon Johnson. During her lifetime, Spencer was able to publish over 30 poems. She earned herself a place in the esteemed Norton Anthology of American Poetry, making her the second African American to be featured in this work. After her death in 1975, much of her work was published in Time's Unfading Garden: Anne Spencer's Life and Poetry. She was also later featured in Shadowed Dreams: Women's Poetry of the Harlem Renaissance. In the later half of the twentieth century, much of Spencer's lost work was found and published by other poets.

== Legacy ==
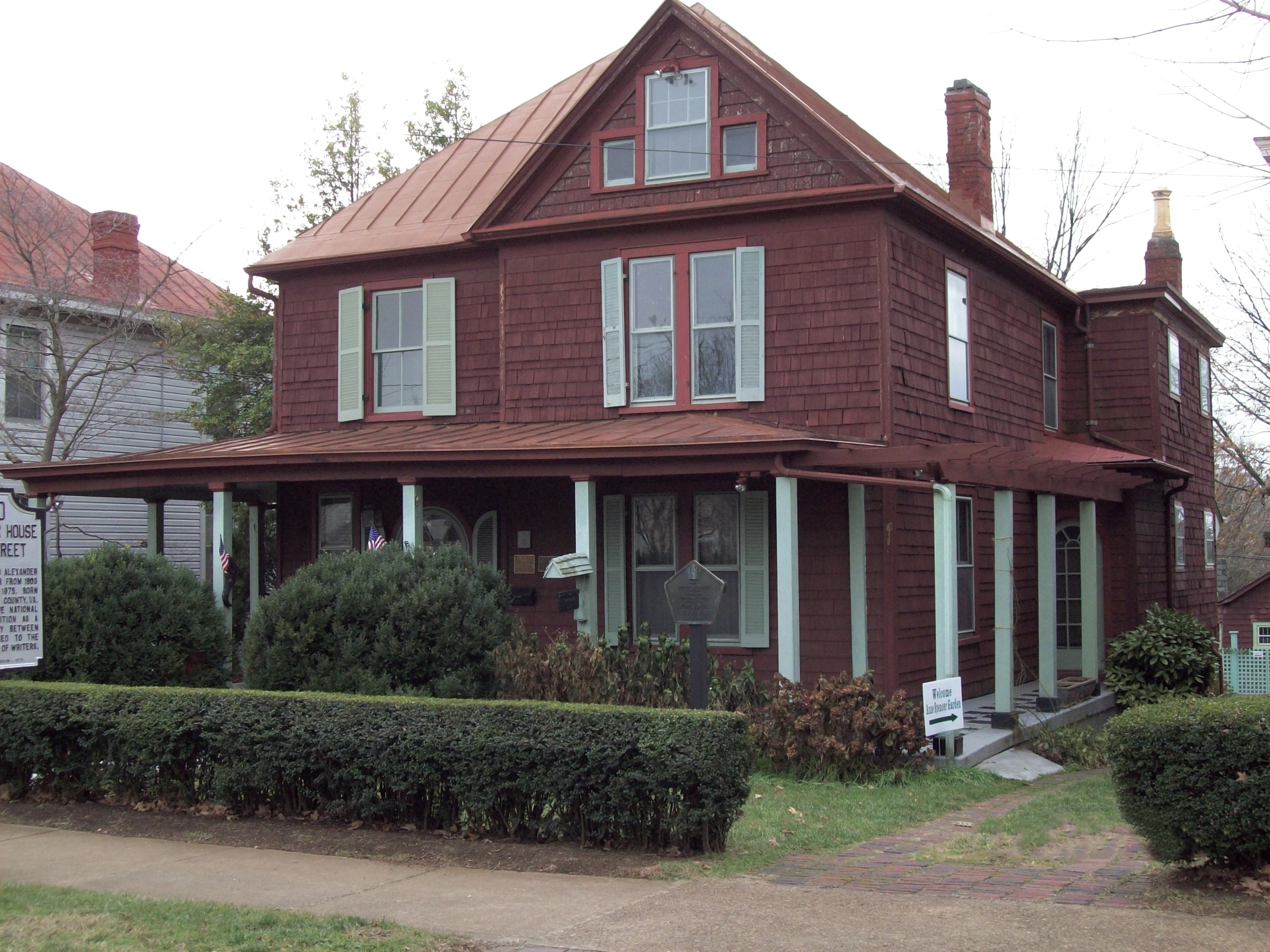
Spencer House Lynchburg Nov 08

Anne Spencer died at the age of 93 on July 27, 1975, and is buried in a family plot at Forest Hills Cemetery, Lynchburg, alongside her husband Edward, who died in 1964. In 2016, the Library of Virginia and Dominion Power honored her as one of the Strong Men and Women in Virginia History.

The Lynchburg home in which Anne Spencer lived and worked is now a museum, the Anne Spencer House and Garden Museum. The Anne Spencer House and Garden Museum is dedicated to preserving her legacy and connection to the Harlem Renaissance. A celebrated gardener during her lifetime, Anne's garden was inextricably woven into her life and provided inspiration for much of her poetry. A garden house, the one-room retreat, called Edankraal, where Anne did much of her writing, is also part of the property. Anne Spencer's papers, related family papers, and books from her personal library all reside at the Albert and Shirley Small Special Collections Library at the University of Virginia. Some of Anne Spencer's personal correspondence with James Weldon Johnson, specifically selected by her, are part of the James Weldon Johnson Memorial Collection at the Beinecke Rare Books and Manuscripts Library at Yale University.

Much of her poetry was deeply connected to her garden. She used her garden and the plants she grew there symbolically in many of her poems, among them, "Grapes, Still Life." One of her most influential works was "White Things", though it was not republished in her lifetime after its initial appearance in The Crisis. Nevertheless, its impact was such that Keith Clark, in Notable Black American Women, referred to it as "the quintessential 'protest' poem". Still poetically active up to her death in 1975, Anne Spencer wrote one of her most evocative poems, titled for that same year, "1975".

In 2019, the United States Postal Service announced that Spencer would be featured on a 2020 Forever stamp honoring figures of the Harlem Renaissance. Others in the quartet include writer Alain Locke; novelist Nella Larsen; and historian Arturo Alfonso Schomburg.

On May 4, 2025, a biographical documentary of Anne Spencer, entitled Earth, I Thank You — produced by the Garden Conservancy — premiered at the Smithsonian Institution's Museum of African American History and Culture. It featured the importance of Spencer's Garden, Edenkraal, as her personal creative space and studio, as well as being a meeting place for notable 20th-century African-American luminaries, such as Langston Hughes, Zora Neale Hurston, James Weldon Johnson, George Washington Carver, W. E. B. Du Bois, Thurgood Marshall, and Martin Luther King.
