= Gregory W. Hayes =

African American Minister

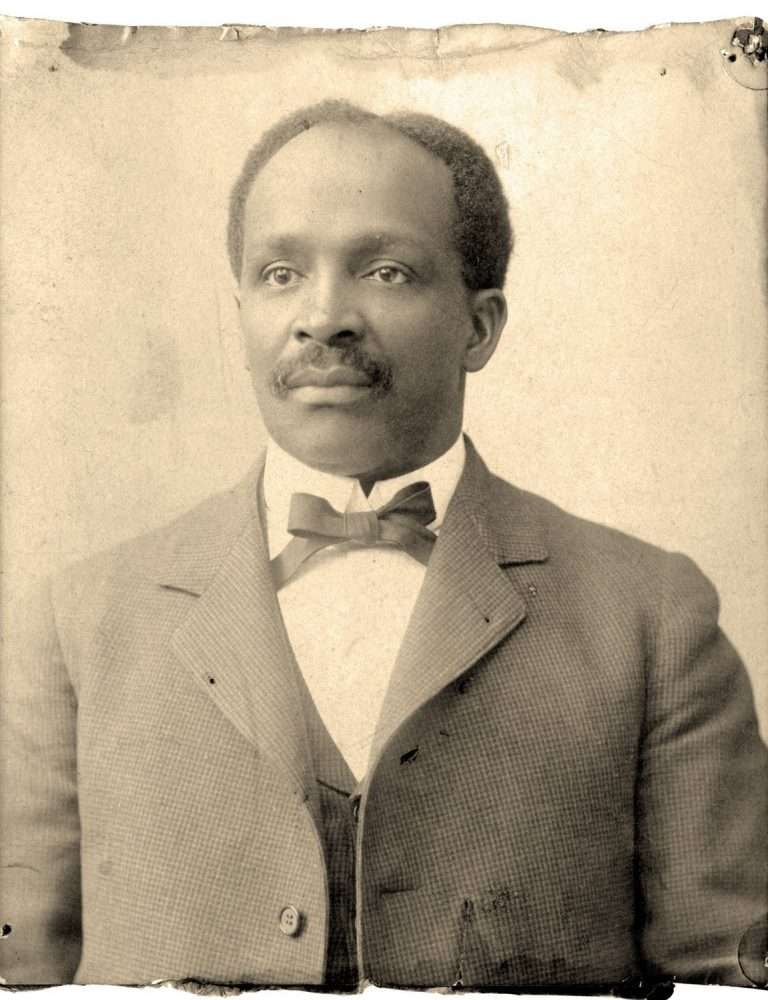
- Died: December 2, 1906
- Education: Oberlin College
- Occupation: Religious leader
- Spouse: Mary Rice Hayes Allen

Gregory W. Hayes (died December 2, 1906) was an American scholar, educator and administrator, who was a prominent leader in the Baptist community of African Americans in the state of Virginia and the city of Richmond). He graduated from Oberlin College. In 1891 he became the second president of the Virginia Seminary, which he led until his death in 1906. His wife, Mary Rice Hayes Allen, was the daughter of a Confederate general and an African-American mother, as related by her daughter (of her second marriage) Carrie Allen McCray. Hayes intervened to provide Ota Benga, a Mbuti pygmy former slave who was exhibited at anthropological exhibitions, the opportunity to live with his family and study at the seminary. In 1899, Hayes was involved in a leadership struggle with Z.D. Lewis over issues of operations and autonomy of an educational institution. His wife succeeded him as the seminary's president after his death. She remarried and moved to Montclair, New Jersey with her second husband.

The G. W. Hayes School of Arts and Sciences, a division of Virginia Seminary and College, was named in 1988 to honor Hayes as its second president. The institution also celebrates an annual Hayes Day celebration, and a statue commemorates his life and leadership.
