= Yellow Sulphur Springs =

- U.S. National Register of Historic Places
- Virginia Landmarks Register
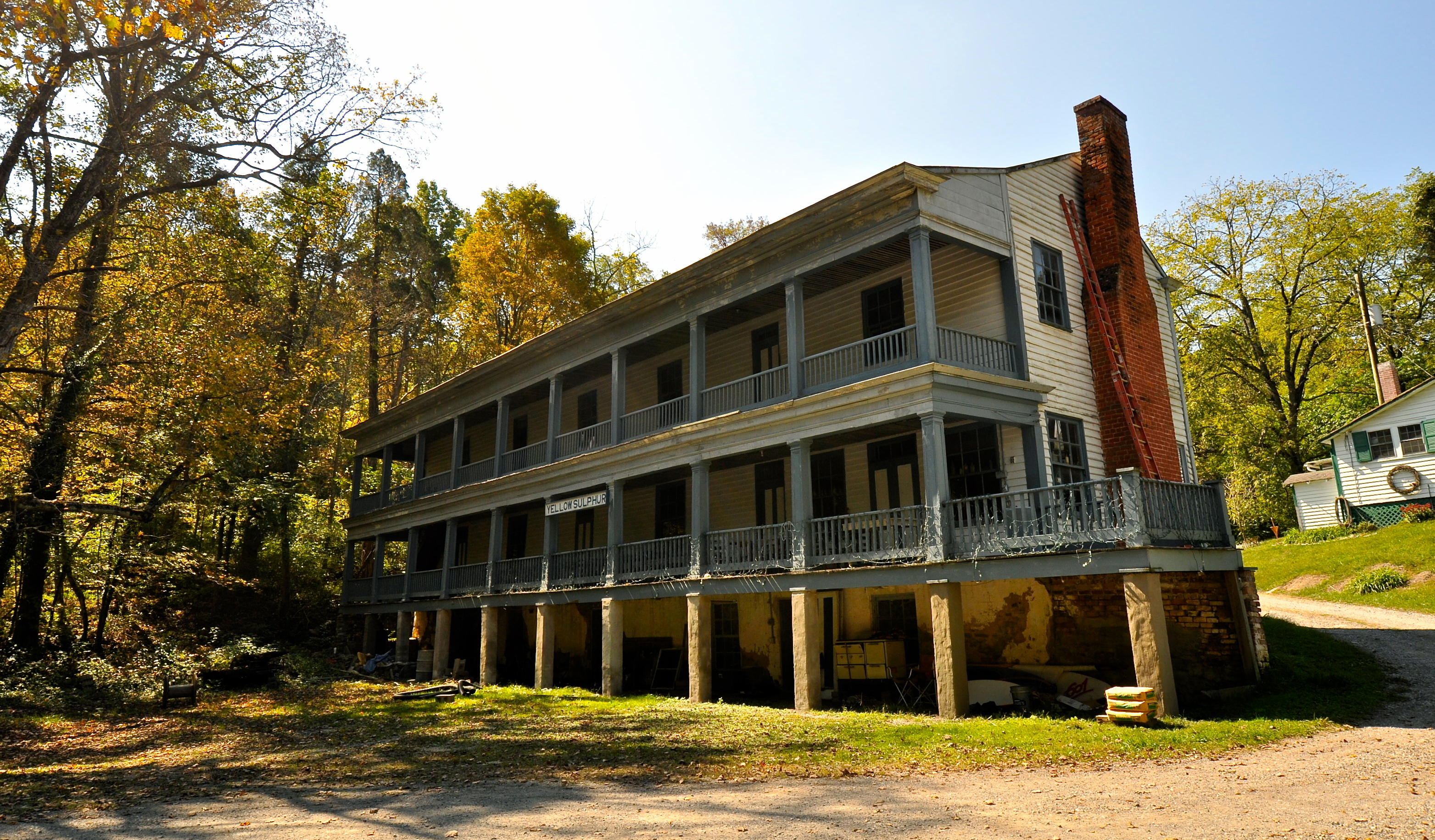
- Yellow Sulphur Springs, September 2013

- Location within Virginia Location within the United States
- Location: North of Christiansburg on VA 643, near Christiansburg, Virginia
- Coordinates: 37°10′38″N 80°23′50″W
- Area: 60 acres (24 ha)
- Built: c. 1810, 1840
- NRHP reference No.: 79003057
- VLR No.: 060-0013

Significant dates
- Added to NRHP: September 20, 1979
- Designated VLR: September 20, 1977

Yellow Sulphur Springs is a historic resort complex located near Christiansburg, Montgomery County, Virginia, United States. The complex includes the main building; proprietor's cottage (1870s); three rows of cottages formerly denominated the Petersburg, Memphis, and Spring Hill rows; a carriage house(no longer standing); and the site of a man-made lake and 19th century bowling alley (in ruins). Though established in the 1700s, the original section of the current main building was built about 1810, and expanded in 1840. The inn was mentioned in local records as far back as the late 1700s, before nearby Blacksburg, Virginia was established. It is a two-story, eight bay frame hotel building set upon a full basement. The building features a two-story portico with square Roman Doric piers stretches the length of the weatherboarded structure. The cold mineral spring water on the property is rich in minerals and doctors prescribed it to their patients.

The Springs has had various owners over the centuries. The first buildings were constructed by Charles Taylor. Ridgeway Holt owned and operated the resort for over 20 years following the Civil War and into the 20th century. During the 1920s Yellow Sulphur Springs was owned and operated by a consortium of local African American businessmen. During the Great Depression the property was leased to the state of Virginia who housed and trained itinerant workers there. After the depression the Springs resort was owned by Charles Crumpacker, a local businessman and farmer. Upon his death his daughter Charlsie "Pistol Packing Mama" Crumpacker owned and lived at the resort.

The property is currently owned by Bernard Ross and Victoria Taylor. Several of the nineteenth century cottages have been refurbished and are occupied by long term renters who enjoy the historic gardens and lovely trees. There is a Healing Arts Studio of new construction where massage and acupuncture treatments are given. www.yellowsulphursprings.com. Additionally a one bedroom guest cottage is available for overnight rental.

It was listed on the National Register of Historic Places in 1979.
