= Virginia University of Lynchburg =

Private HBCU in Lynchburg, Virginia, U.S.

- Former names: Lynchburg Baptist Seminary (1886–1890); Virginia Seminary (1890–1900); Virginia Theological Seminary and College (1900–1962); Virginia Seminary and College (1962–1996)
- Motto: Sibi Auxilium et Libertas (Self Help and Freedom)
- Type: Private historically black university
- Established: 1886; 140 years ago
- Accreditation: TRACS
- Religious affiliation: Christian
- President: Kathy Franklin
- Administrative staff: 50
- Students: 581 (fall 2024)
- Location: Lynchburg, Virginia, U.S. 37°23′42.7″N 79°9′6.3″W
- Campus: Suburban
- Colors: Navy Blue & Light Blue
- Nickname: Dragons
- Sporting affiliations: National Christian College Athletic Association – South
- Website: wp.vul.edu
- Virginia University of Lynchburg
- U.S. National Register of Historic Places
- U.S. Historic district
- Virginia Landmarks Register
- Location within Virginia Location within the United States
- Location: 2058 Garfield Ave., Lynchburg, Virginia
- Area: 6.82 acres (2.76 ha)
- Built: 1888
- Architect: Romulus C. Archer Jr.
- Architectural style: Colonial Revival, Beaux-Arts
- NRHP reference No.: 11000035
- VLR No.: 118-5297

Significant dates
- Added to NRHP: February 22, 2011
- Designated VLR: December 16, 2010

Virginia University of Lynchburg (VUL) is a private historically black Christian university in Lynchburg, Virginia. VUL offers undergraduate, graduate, and doctoral programs primarily focused on religious studies, business, and the liberal arts. Academically, VUL is structured into three main schools: the School of Religion, School of Business Administration, and School of Liberal Arts & Sciences.

VUL is accredited by the Transnational Association of Christian Colleges and Schools (TRACS). The campus is a historic district listed on the National Register of Historic Places.

== History ==
Virginia University of Lynchburg is the oldest school of higher learning in Lynchburg. The school was founded in 1886 and incorporated in 1888 by the Virginia Baptist State Convention as the coeducational "Lynchburg Baptist Seminary". Classes were first held in 1890 under the name Virginia Seminary. With the offering of a collegiate program in 1900, the name was again changed, to "Virginia Theological Seminary and College". In 1962, the institution was renamed to the "Virginia Seminary and College". Finally, in 1996, the school was given its current name. The campus includes three historic academic buildings on 6.82 acres (2.76 ha): Graham Hall (1917), Humbles Hall (1920–21), and the Mary Jane Cachelin Memorial Science and Library Building (1946). These buildings and the Hayes Monument (c. 1906) comprise a historic district, which was listed on the National Register of Historic Places in 2010.

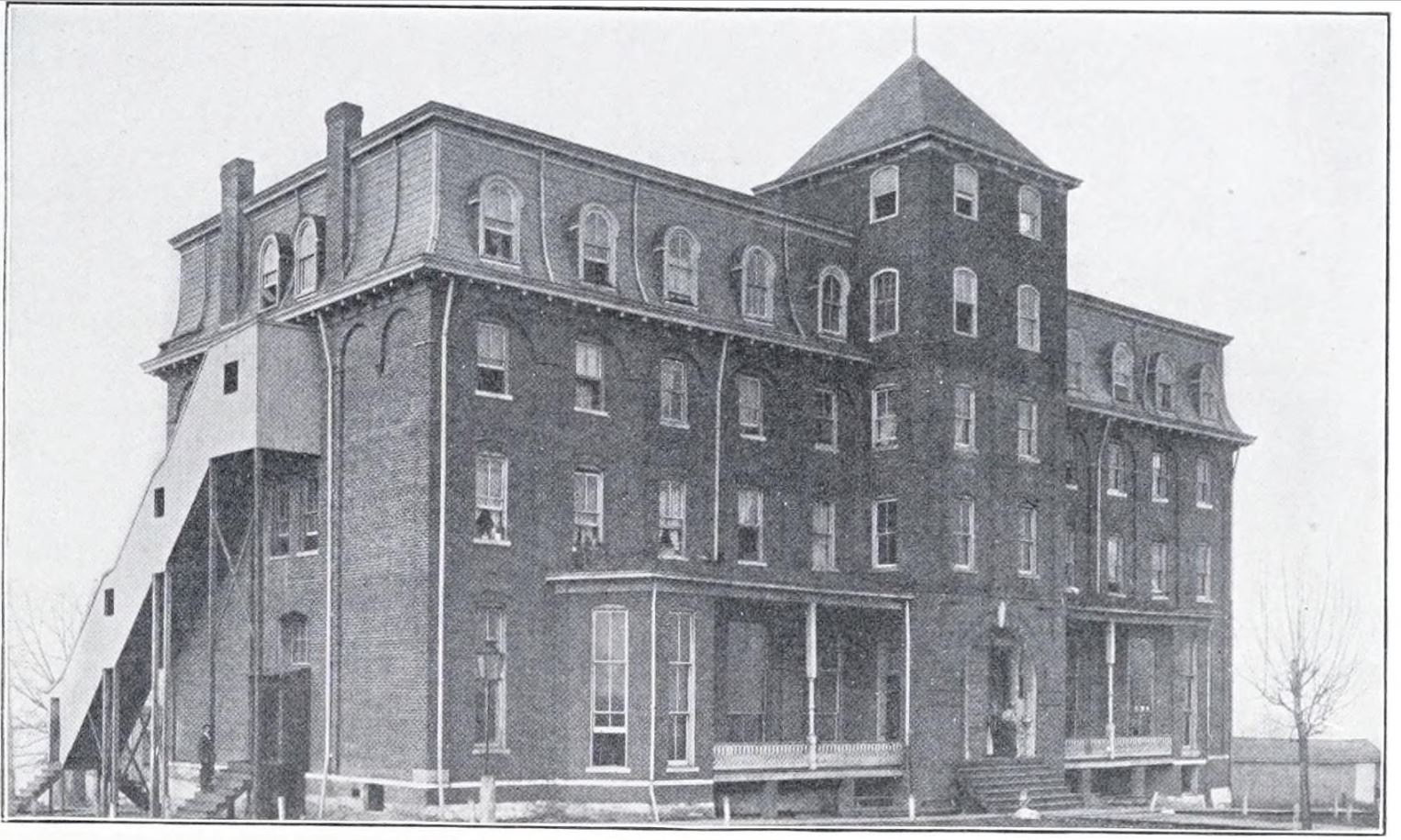
Main building in 1910

Its first president was Phillip F. Morris, pastor of the city's Court Street Baptist Church. Seeking a financial patron, Morris agreed to step down as president rather than yield to the demand of the American Baptist Home Mission Society that he step down from the pulpit to assume full-time leadership of the school. Morris would later serve as president of the National Baptist Convention. Gregory W. Hayes, a graduate of Oberlin College, assumed the full-time position as president in 1891, serving until his death in 1906. His wife, Mary Rice Hayes Allen, biracial daughter of a Confederate general John R. Jones, and mother of author Carrie Allen McCray, assumed the presidency until succeeded by JRL Diggs in 1908.

During Hayes' administration, controversy arose between Black separatists and accommodationists over the future of the school. The chief patron wished it to become a pre-collegiate manual training institution. Hayes, among the separatists, returned the patronage to retain and strengthen black autonomy and academic integrity. This move eventually led to a schism within the National Baptist Convention.

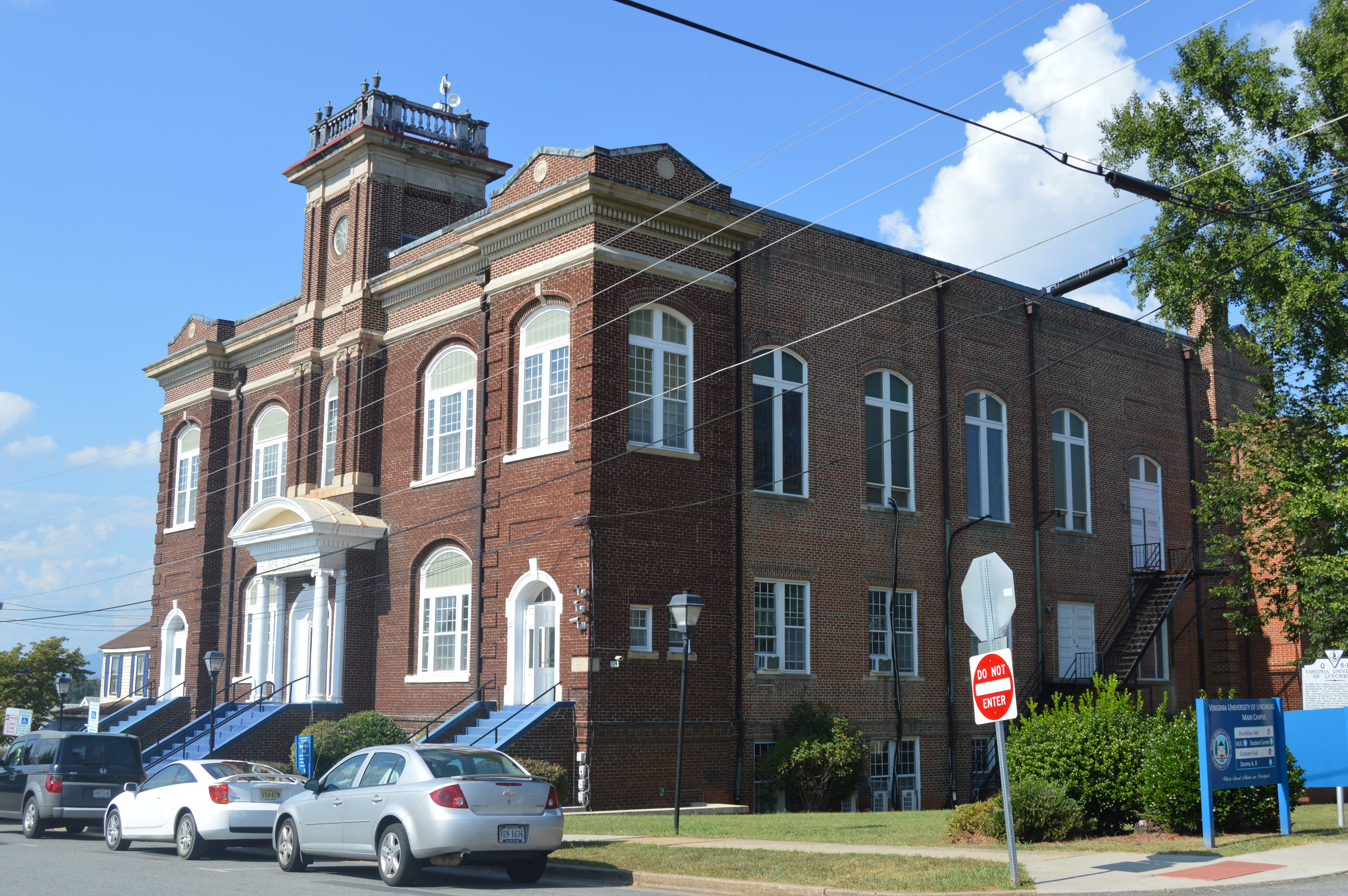
Humbles Hall in 2016

In July 2010, the school reached an agreement with Liberty University to help VUL students looking for degrees not offered at the school to complete their degrees at Liberty.

On April 22, 2024, the university's accreditor, TRACS, voted to place the VUL on probation for failing to maintain its accreditation standards. Namely, the TRACS board found issue in the financing of VUL, stating the institution failed to meet Title IV regulations, and must provide a full audit of its 2023 financials. VUL had until September 1, 2024, to submit its completed 2023 audit, otherwise the TRACS board would have voted on whether to place the school on a second year of probation, which could have resulted in the school losing its accreditation as a university. However, as of 2025, the institution has demonstrated compliance with all TRACS standards, with no follow-up reporting required.

=== University presidents ===
The following have led Virginia University of Lynchburg since its founding:

1. Philip F. Morris, 1888–1890
2. Gregory W. Hayes, 1891–1906
3. Mary Rice Hayes Allen, 1906–1908
4. James Robert Lincoln Diggs, 1908–1911
5. Robert C. Woods, 1911–1926
6. William H.R. Powell, 1926–1929, 1934–1946
7. Vernon Johns, 1929–1934
8. Madison C. Allen, 1946–1966
9. MacCarthy C. Sutherland, 1966–1980
10. Benjamin W. Robertson, 1980
11. Leroy Fitts, 1980–1981
12. Thomas E. Parker, 1982–1987
13. Melvin R. Boone, 1988–1990
14. Ada M. Palmer, 1990–1992
15. Elisha G. Hall, 1992–1999
16. Ralph Reavis, 2000–2015
17. Kathy C. Franklin, 2016–Present

== Athletics ==
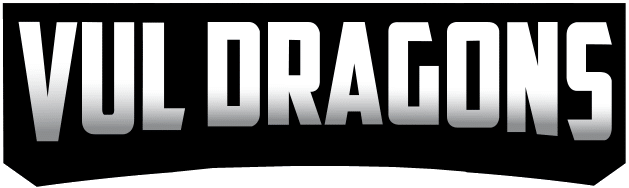
VUL athletics wordmark

The VUL athletic teams are called the Dragons. The university is a member of the National Christian College Athletic Association (NCCAA) Division I. The Dragons were formerly a member of the United States Collegiate Athletic Association (USCAA). VUL previously competed, from 1921–22 to 1953–54, as a member of the Central Intercollegiate Athletic Association (CIAA), which is currently an NCAA Division II athletic conference.

VUL competes in eight intercollegiate varsity sports: Men's sports include basketball, football and track & field (indoor and outdoor); while women's sports include basketball, track & field (indoor and outdoor) and volleyball.

== Notable alumni and faculty ==
- Lawrence Carter, civil rights historian
- John Chilembwe, a Nyasa (Malawian) Baptist preacher and leader of the 1915 Chilembwe uprising. Graduated in 1901.
- Georgia Mabel DeBaptiste, academic
- James Robert Lincoln Diggs, pastor and civil rights activist
- Herman Dreer (1888–1981), academic administrator, educator, educational reformer and activist, author, editor, minister, and civil rights leader
- Vernon Johns, pastor and civil rights activist
- W. Henry Maxwell, politician and pastor
- Stella James Sims, biology professor at Storer College, Virginia University of Lynchburg, and Bluefield State College
- Anne Spencer, poet, teacher, civil rights activist, librarian, and gardener
- Fleming Emory Alexander, minister and businessman who founded the Roanoke Tribune in Roanoke, Virginia
