= James Robert Lincoln Diggs =

American civil rights leader

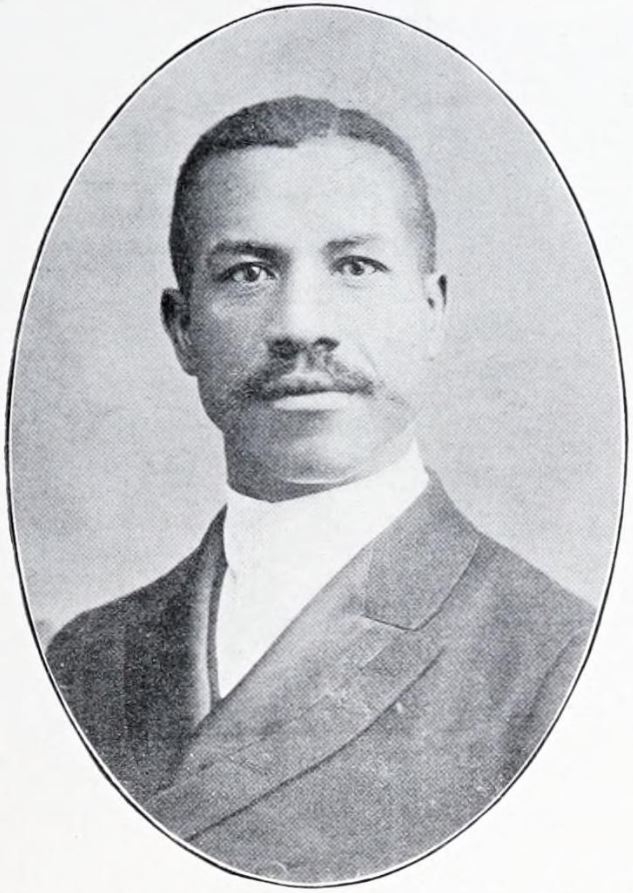
- Diggs, c. 1910

Biographical details
- Born: November 7, 1866; Upper Marlboro, Maryland, U.S.
- Died: April 14, 1923; Baltimore, Maryland, U.S.
- Education: Bucknell (BA, 1898; MA, 1899); Illinois Wesleyan (Ph.D., 1906)

Coaching career (HC unless noted)
- 1900–1901: Virginia Union

Head coaching record
- Overall: 3–3

James Robert Lincoln Diggs (November 7, 1866 – April 14, 1923) was an American civil rights leader, college president, pastor, and college football coach.

== Early life and studies ==
Diggs earned degrees from Bucknell University in Lewisburg, Pennsylvania and a Ph.D. from Illinois Wesleyan University in Bloomington, Illinois. He became the first African American to receive a doctorate in sociology in the United States and the ninth overall to receive any doctorate.

== Wayland Seminary and Virginia Union ==
Diggs was a member of the Wayland Seminary faculty when it was merged with Virginia Union University in 1898. He served as the school's head football coach from 1900 to 1901.

== College presidencies ==
Diggs served as the president of several colleges, including Virginia University of Lynchburg (then known as Virginia Seminary) from 1906 to 1908 and Simmons College of Kentucky from 1908 to 1911. He help found the Niagara Movement.

== Pastorship ==
Diggs later became a Baptist pastor, leading congregations in Washington, D.C. and Baltimore.

== Death ==
Diggs died on April 14, 1923, at his home in Baltimore.

== Head coaching record ==
Year	Team	Overall	Conference	Standing	Bowl/playoffs
Virginia Union Panthers (Independent) (1900–1901)
1900	Virginia Union	1–2			
1901	Virginia Union	2–1			
Virginia Union:		3–3			
Total:		3–3			
