= Bransford Vawter =

American writer

- Born: 1815; United States
- Died: 1838 (aged 22–23)
- Occupation: Poet
- Writing career
- Genre: Poetry

Bransford Vawter (1815–1838) was a poet from Lynchburg, Virginia. He has been described as Lynchburg's first poet. He is remembered for his poem "I'd Offer Thee This Hand Of Mine", which ended up becoming a popular song. He is also the subject of an award-winning screenplay The Poem.

== Background ==
Vawter, the son of a tailor was born in 1815. His parents were Benjamin Vawter and Milly Gutrey.

Earlier on he had an interest in literature, especially poetry. His poem, "I'd Offer Thee This Hand Of Mine", which turned out to be his most famous, was published in the Southern Literary Messenger in 1834. It was actually published anonymously and caused something of a stir nationally. Once it became known that Vawter was its author, he was able to enjoy local celebrity status for a short period of time. The story behind "I'd Offer Thee This Hand Of Mine" is that he was in love with Ann Norvell, who was from a different class from him. She ended up marrying another man, possibly one that her parents chose for her. According to the Vawter Family website, there are claims by some people that it was written to a Miss Labby.

In books such as High-school Journalism by Harold Spears, Charles Hubert Lawshe, and Lynchburg: 1757-2007 by Dorothy Potter, Clifton W. Potter, he is referred to as Lynchburg's first poet. In the book First Baptist Church, Lynchburg, he has been described as Lynchburg's first major poet.

== Personal and family ==
=== Other family members ===
He had an older brother Silas, who was married to Sarah Fear in 1830.

=== Illness and death ===
Vawter died in 1838 at the age of 23 most likely from a lung condition. He was in an unmarked grave until October 14, 1936. Then Carter Glass Chapter of the Quill and Scroll Society presented a memorial stone for him.

His tombstone, which is at The Old City Cemetery in Lynchburg, Virginia, has the words "Here lies the body of Bransford Vawter Lynchburgs first poet 1815–1838 Hearts so warm so fine as thine should never know distress" inscribed on it.

== Vawter as subject ==
Vawter is the subject of the poem "The Grave of Bransford Vawter" by Cornelia J. Matthews Jordan who was a poet from a later period in the 1800s. In 2014 The Poem, a screenplay by Dawn Fields aka Dawn Fields Wise about him was one of three winners at the Virginia Film Office’s 2014 screenwriting competition. It was also a finalist in the Nashville Film Festival’s inaugural Screenwriting Competition.
