= Minnie Renwood =

American dancer (fl. 1890s)

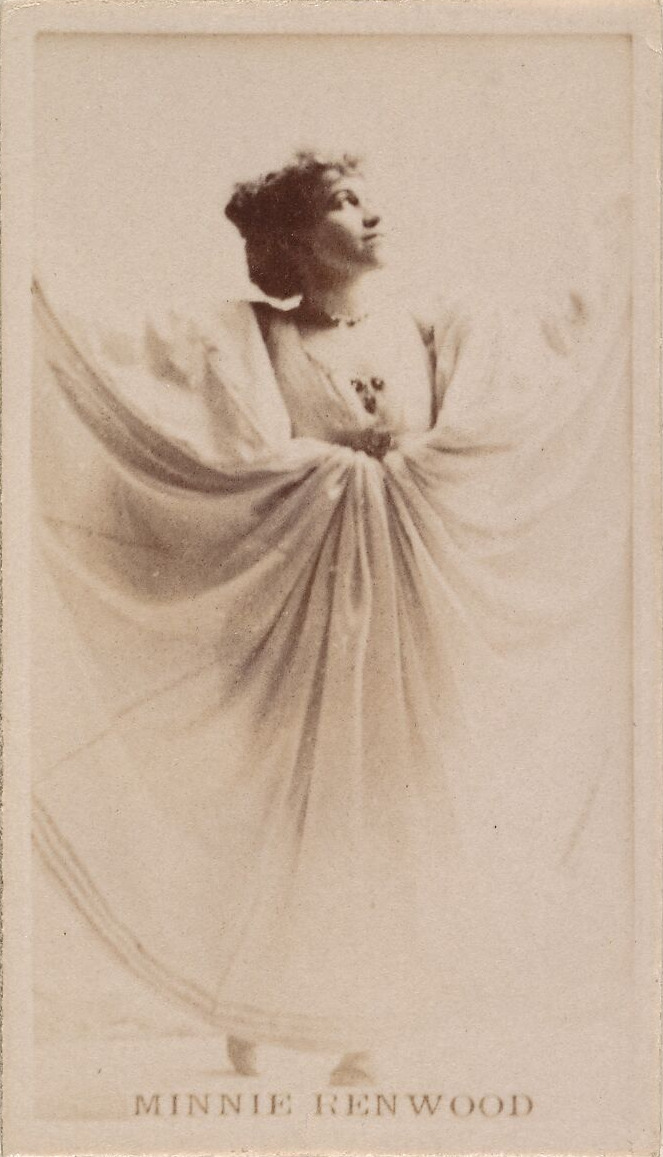
Minnie Renwood in 1890

Minnie Renwood was a popular American dancer of the 1890s in New York City. Her performance of the serpentine dance became the subject of an important legal ruling regarding dance and copyright.

== Dance career ==
Renwood performed the serpentine dance during a benefit for Ernest Hutchinson at the 14th Street (Manhattan) Theatre in May 1892. She appeared in violet tights and loosely draped white silk skirts at the informal inaugural opening of the Madison Square Garden roof show, on May 26, 1892. Accompanied by Spanish language students she performed her Spanish, butterfly, and shadow dances. The students played mandolins which created a background of staccato music. The sounds caused the lanterns to bob up and down and electric lamps in hues of red, white, and yellow blinked disapprovingly at one another.

"Soon, she (Loïe Fuller) auditioned for Rudolph Aronson of New York's Casino Theatre. He named her dance 'The Serpentine' and hired her to perform it as an entr'act in the comedy Uncle Celestin. Fuller achieved critical success with her Serpentine performances at the Casino and—when a dispute with Aronson forced her to switch venues—at the Madison Square Theatre. However, Fuller's artistic achievements were soon dwarfed by legal troubles (among them, a copyright infringement suit against Minnie Renwood, the dancer Aronson hired to replace Fuller..."

== Judicial decision ==
United States Circuit Court Judge Lancombe ruled against an injunction filed by dancer Loie Fuller to prevent Renwood from performing the serpentine dance on the roof of Madison Square Garden, in June 1892. Fuller had originated the dance, which she contended that she retained the exclusive right to perform because she held its copyright. In denying the injunction Lancombe stated "it is essential to such a composition that it should tell the same story. The plot may be simple it may be but narrative, or a representation of a single transaction, but it must repeat or mimic some action, speech, emotion, passion, or character, real or imaginary. When it does, its ideas thus expressed become subject of copyright." He concluded by saying that the serpentine dance was only intended to impress the audience with the concept of "a comely woman illustrating the poetry of motion in a singularly graceful fashion, and while such an idea may be pleasing, it can hardly be dramatic. Motion for preliminary injunction denied." A central point of his ruling was Lancombe's statement that "the mere mechanical movements by which effects are produced on the stage are not subjects of copyright."

== Illness ==
In August 1897, Renwood underwent a serious operation and was confined to a New York City sanitarium. The columnist believed she would not dance again for some time.
