= Robert Stuart MacArthur =

American Baptist preacher and author

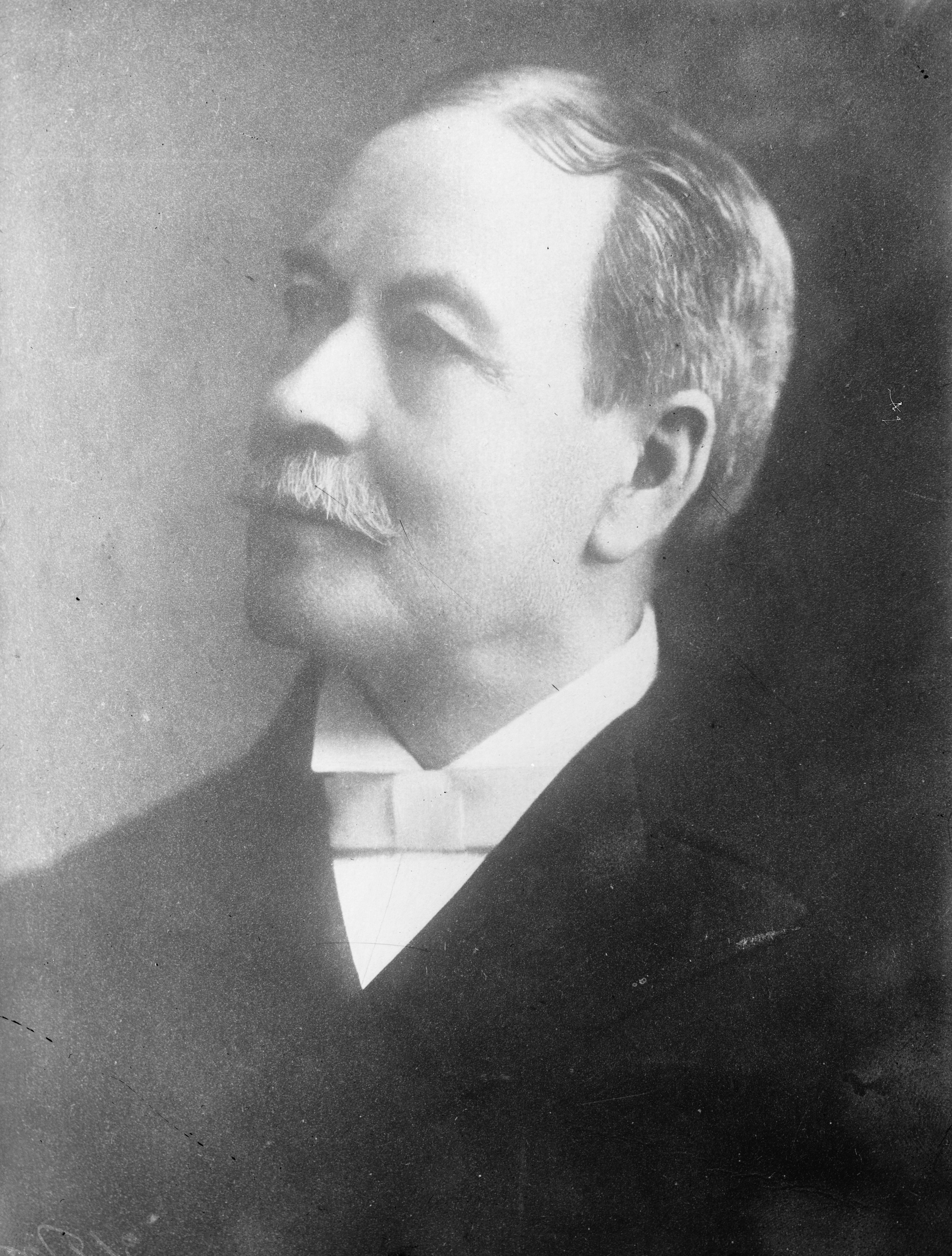
Robert Stuart MacArthur, c. 1899

Robert Stuart MacArthur (July 31, 1841 – February 23, 1923) was a Baptist preacher, lecturer, and author. He was a longtime pastor of the Calvary Baptist Church in New York City, raising it to prominence in his more than 40 years there.

== Biography ==
Born in Dalesville, Quebec, Canada, MacArthur converted at the age of 13. He attended Grammar School No. 35 and then graduated from the University of Rochester in 1867, and from Rochester Theological Seminary in 1870. He was ordained and became pastor of Calvary Baptist Church on May 15 of that year, and married Mary Elizabeth Fox on August 4.

At the time MacArthur became pastor, Calvary Baptist Church had 238 members. Within five years, church membership more than doubled, and church collections increased sixfold. MacArthur oversaw the construction of a new church building, the formation of three additional congregations, and a growth in membership in the "mother church" to 2300 members by 1910.

MacArthur's publications include hymnals, sermon collections, and apologetic works.

In 1906, MacArthur took what was a politically and socially unpopular stance against the Bronx Zoo's popular exhibition and custody of a black man with diminutive stature; an African Bushman named Ota Benga was caged with the zoo's monkeys. MacArthur publicly aligned himself with the city's black clergy and pledged his support to stop the zoo's exhibition. He deemed the well-attended show degrading, brutal and inconsistent with Christian values.

With a 41 year tenure, MacArthur served the longest of any pastor in the history of Calvary Baptist Church. MacArthur resigned as pastor from Calvary Baptist Church in 1911, and held the title of pastor emeritus until 1921, when he gave up the title to avoid association with what he called the "sensationalism" of then-pastor John Roach Straton. After further disagreement with the direction Calvary was going, MacArthur and his wife resigned membership in Calvary in 1922, and transferred membership to Old Cambridge Baptist Church, where his son was pastor.

MacArthur died in Florida on February 23, 1923 and was memorialized in New York that May.

== Bibliography ==
- Robert Stuart MacArthur (1899). Bible Difficulties and Their Alleviative Interpretation: Old Testament. E.B. Treat.
- Robert Stuart MacArthur (1898). Current Questions for Thinking Men. American Baptist Publication Society.
- Robert Stuart MacArthur; Frank Rogers Morse (1890). History of Calvary Baptist Church, New York. E. Scott.
- Robert Stuart MacArthur (1899). The Celestial Lamp: And Other Sermons. American Publication Society.
- The Attractive Christ and other sermons
