= Serpentine dance =

Stage dance from the 1890s

The serpentine dance is a form of dance that was popular throughout the United States and Europe in the 1890s, becoming a staple of stage shows and early film.

== Background ==
The Serpentine is an evolution of the skirt dance, a form of burlesque dance that had recently arrived in the United States from England. Skirt dancing was itself a reaction against "academic" forms of ballet, incorporating tamed-down versions of folk and popular dances like the can-can.

== Development ==
The serpentine dance was originated by Loïe Fuller, who gave varying accounts of how she developed it. By her own account, having never danced professionally before, she accidentally discovered the effects of stage light cast from different angles on the gauze fabric of a costume she had hastily assembled for her performance in the play Quack M.D., and spontaneously developed the new form in response to the audience's enthusiastic reaction upon seeing the way her skirt appeared in the lights. During the dance she held her long skirt in her hands, and waved it around, revealing her form inside. In the words of the dance historian Jack Anderson, "The costume for her Serpentine Dance consisted of hundreds of yards of China silk which she let billow around her while lighting effects suggested that it was catching fire and taking shapes reminiscent of flowers, clouds, birds, and butterflies."

By 1891, Fuller combined her choreography with silk costumes illuminated by multi-coloured lighting of her own design, and created the Serpentine Dance. After much difficulty finding someone willing to produce her work when she was primarily known as an actress, she was hired to perform her piece between acts of a comedy entitled Uncle Celestine, and received rave reviews.

"Soon, she (Loïe Fuller) auditioned for Rudolph Aronson of New York’s Casino Theatre. He named her dance “The Serpentine” and hired her to perform it as an entr’act in the comedy Uncle Celestin. Fuller achieved critical success with her Serpentine performances at the Casino and—when a dispute with Aronson forced her to switch venues—at the Madison Square Theatre. However, Fuller’s artistic achievements were soon dwarfed by legal troubles (among them, a copyright infringement suit against Minnie Renwood, the dancer Aronson hired to replace Fuller..."

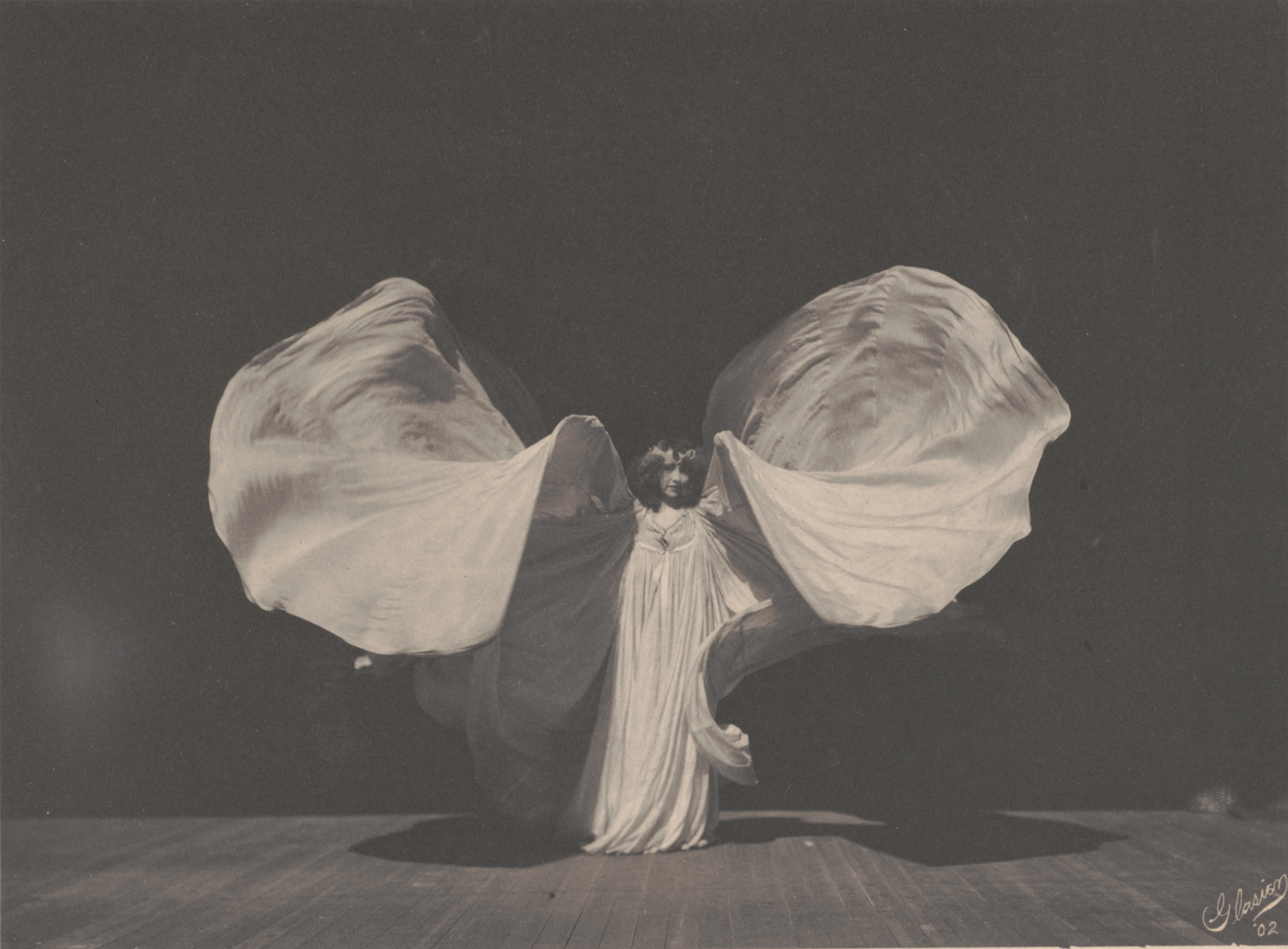
Portrait of Fuller by Frederick Glasier, 1902

Almost immediately, she was replaced by imitators (originally Minnie "Renwood" Bemis). In the hope of receiving serious artistic recognition that she was not getting in America, Fuller left for Europe in June 1892.

== Filmed versions ==
The Serpentine Dance was a frequent subject of early motion pictures, as it highlighted the new medium's ability to portray movement and light. Two particularly well-known versions were Annabelle Serpentine Dance (1895), a performance by Broadway dancer Annabelle Whitford from Edison Studios, and a Lumière brothers film made in 1896. Many other filmmakers produced their own versions, distributing prints that had been hand-tinted to evoke the appearance of colored light projection.

Annabelle Serpentine Dance, No. 2

A segment from Annabelle Butterfly & Serpentine Dances

Lina Esbrard's Serpentine dance

Méliès - La Colonne de feu (The column of fire)

Lumière brothers' serpentine dance

Création de la Serpentine (creation of the serpentine)

Colorized excerpt of Création de la Serpentine (creation of the serpentine)

Colorized excerpt of Loïe Fuller's Danse serpentine (serpentine dance)

== See also ==
- Die Serpentintänzerin
