= Old City Cemetery (Lynchburg, Virginia) =

Historic cemetery in Lynchburg, Virginia

- U.S. National Register of Historic Places
- Virginia Landmarks Register
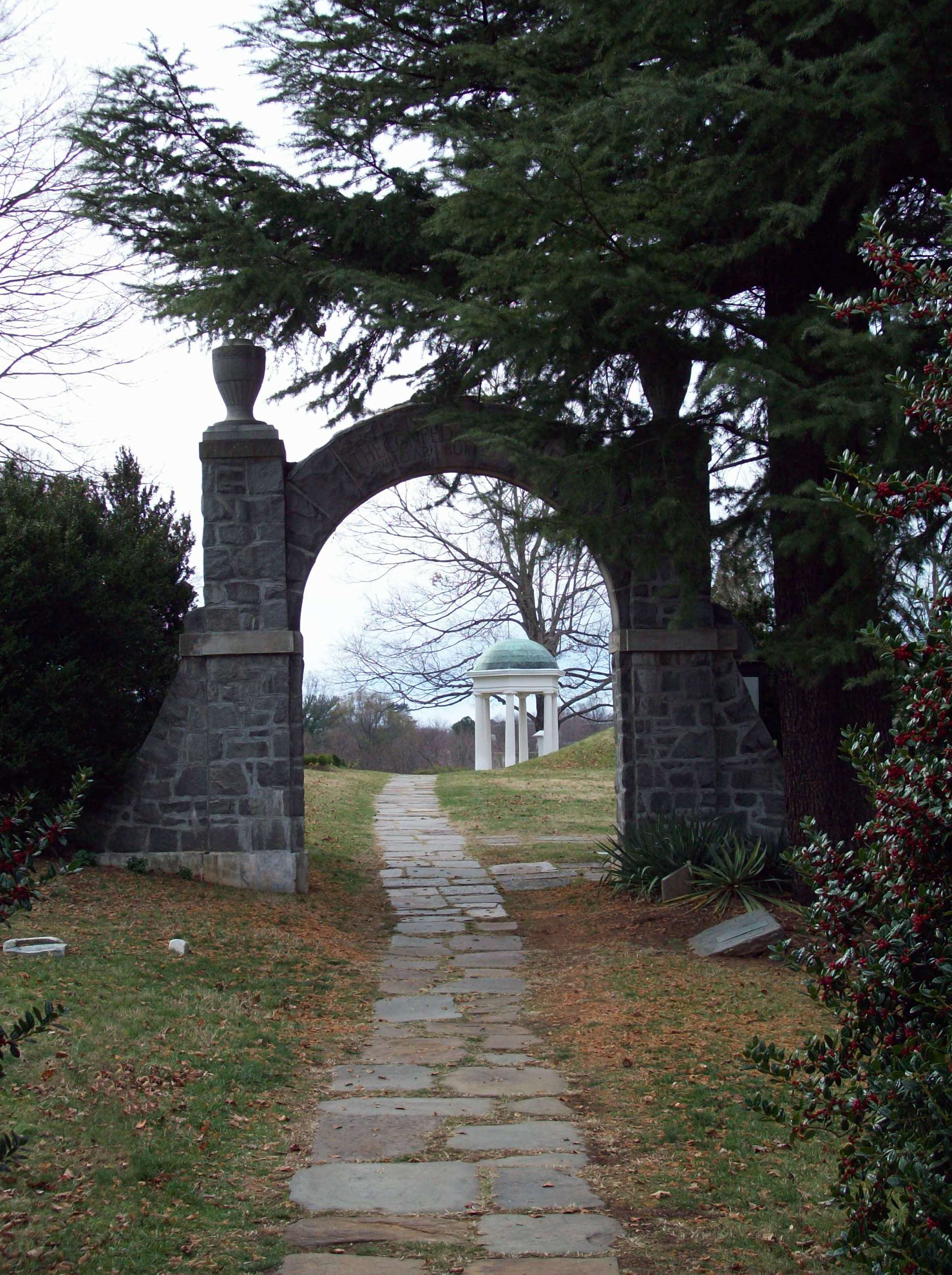
- Old City Cemetery, Lynchburg VA, View of Confederate Section, November 2008

- Location within Virginia Location within the United States
- Location: 4th, Monroe, 1st Sts. and Southern RR. tracks, Lynchburg, Virginia
- Coordinates: 37°24′53″N 79°09′23″W
- Area: 26 acres (11 ha)
- Built: 1806
- NRHP reference No.: 73002216
- VLR No.: 118-0027

Significant dates
- Added to NRHP: April 2, 1973
- Designated VLR: September 19, 1972

The Old City Cemetery is a historic cemetery in Lynchburg, Virginia. It is the oldest municipal (city-owned) cemetery still in use today in the state of Virginia, and one of the oldest such burial grounds in the United States. Since the 1990s it has been operated as a history park and arboretum, in addition to being an active cemetery.

The exact number of interments in Old City Cemetery is unknown because of a lack of official records before 1914, but it is estimated that 18,000–20,000 people are at final rest there. They represent an unusually diverse cross-section of the local community, including founding fathers and mothers of the town, Confederate soldiers who died in military hospitals, African American tobacco factory laborers, European immigrants, paupers, and "strangers" who died passing through town.

Two-thirds of the burials in the cemetery are African American. It has been estimated that over 90% of Lynchburg's enslaved and free African American population are buried in the Old City Cemetery, the primary burial site for African Americans from 1806 to 1865. In fact, at that time it was the only burial ground, excluding private family graveyards, available to African Americans in the area. A notable burial is that of Ota Benga (c. 1883–1916), a Congolese pygmy exhibited at human zoos, although his remains may have been later moved to Lynchburg's White Rock Hill Cemetery.

The cemetery's Confederate section contains the graves of over 2,200 soldiers from 14 states. Also interred at the cemetery is poet Bransford Vawter.

The cemetery was established on land donated to the City of Lynchburg by city founder John Lynch. The original deed for the property states it shall be used as a public burying ground or for a house of worship—and for no other purpose whatsoever.

The 27-acre (11 ha) site includes four small historic house museums located inside the cemetery, which is cared for by the Southern Memorial Association.

- Pest House Medical Museum, Lynchburg's first hospital
- Hearse House and Caretakers' Museum, museum about the cemetery and funerals
- Station House Museum, a reconstructed C&O Railway depot furnished as in World War I
- Mourning Museum, museum about mourning customs, located inside the Cemetery Center

The cemetery also includes a non-denominational Chapel, built to commemorate the 200-year anniversary of the founding of Lynchburg's Old City Cemetery in 1806, and a Columbarium with niches and crypts for new burials below the Chapel.

== Gallery ==
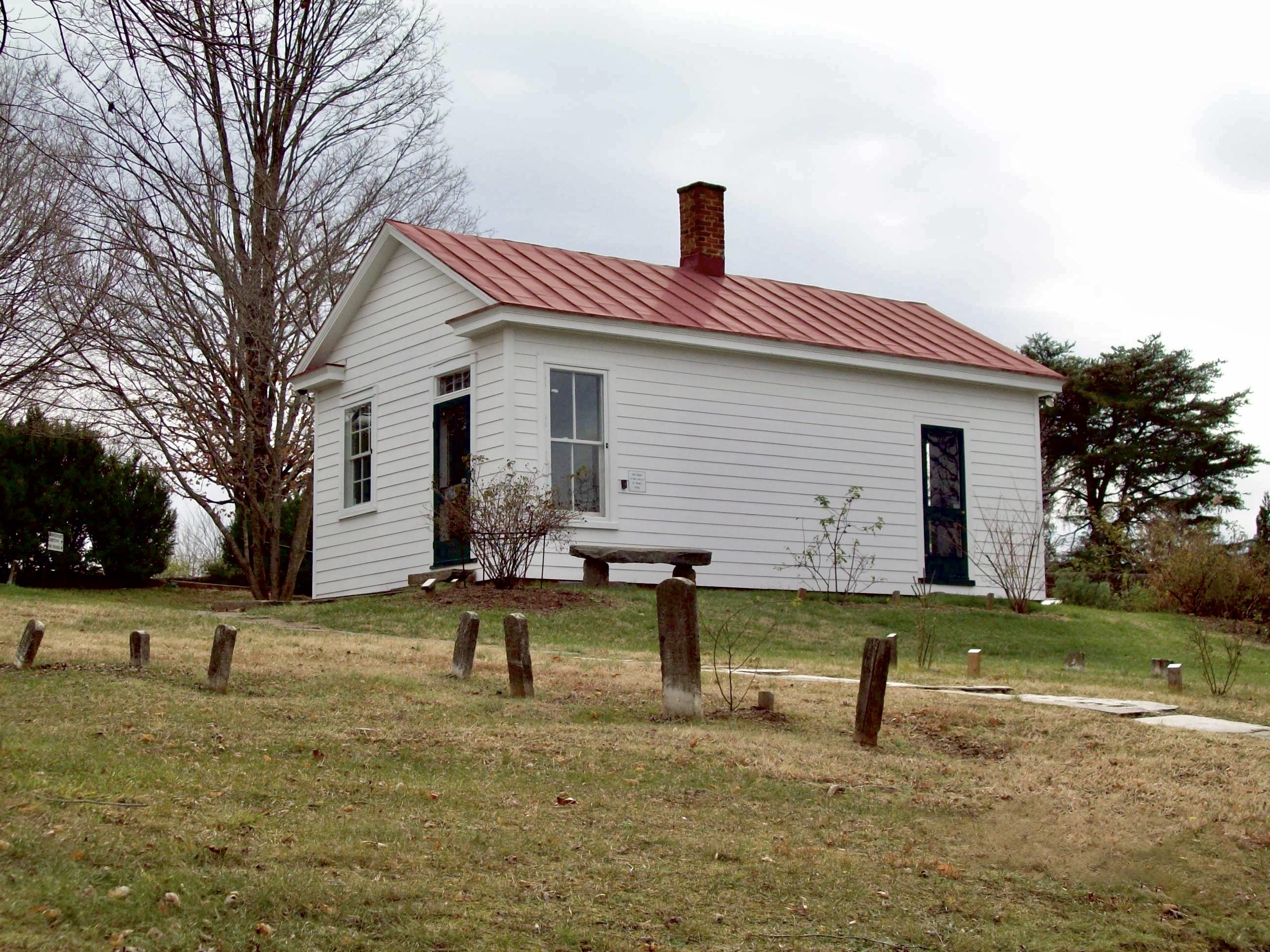
Pest House Museum, Old City Cemetery, Lynchburg VA, November 2008

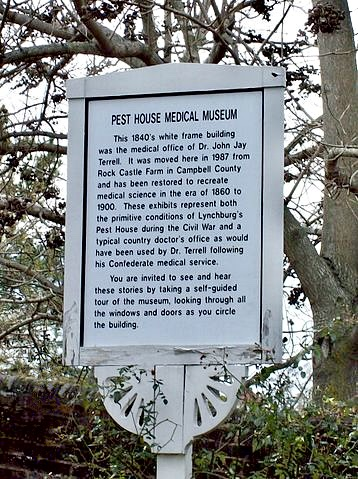
Pest House Museum (Sign), Old City Cemetery, Lynchburg VA, November 2008

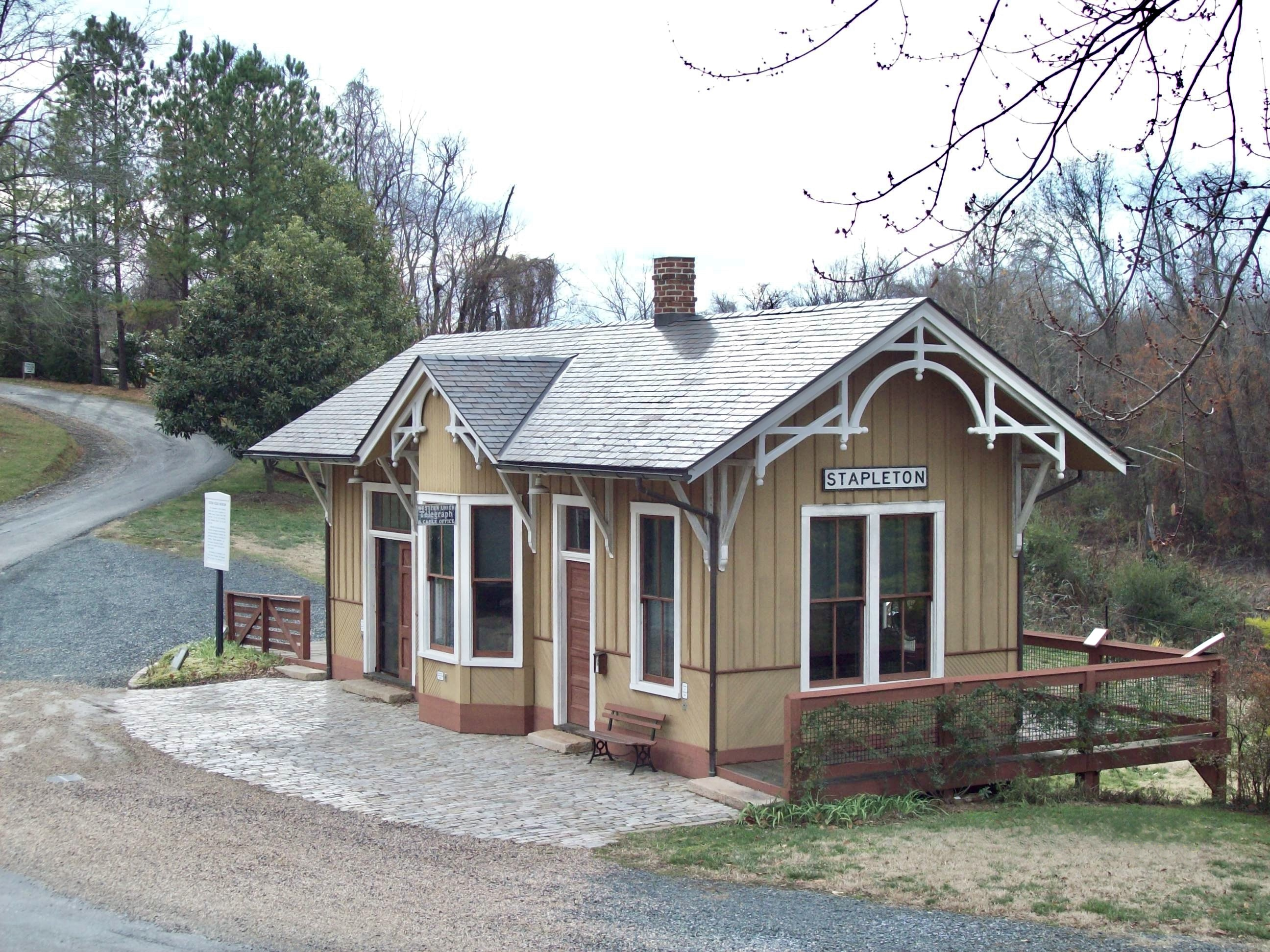
Station House Museum, Old City Cemetery, Lynchburg VA, November 2008

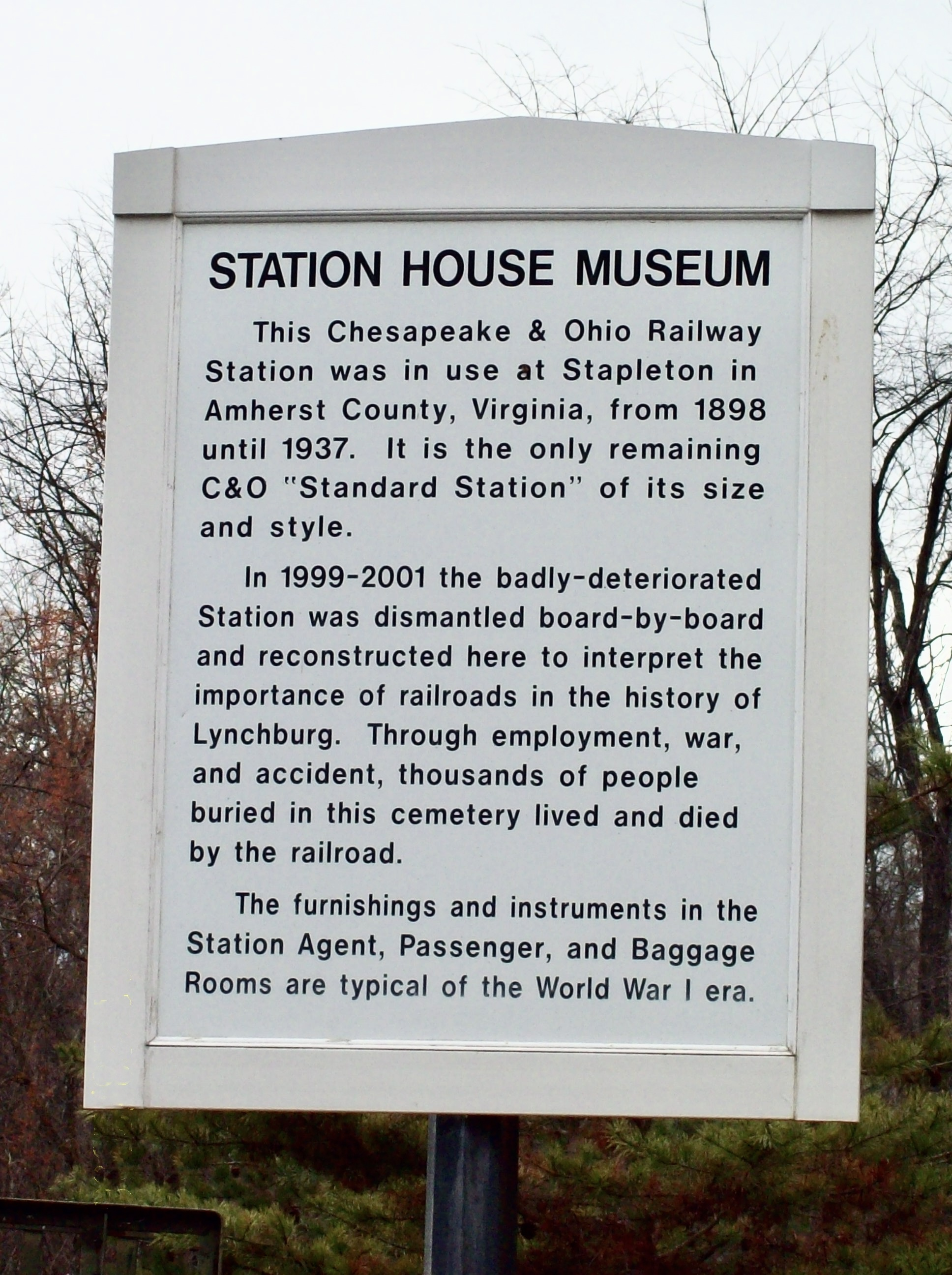
Station House Museum (Sign), Old City Cemetery, Lynchburg VA, November 2008

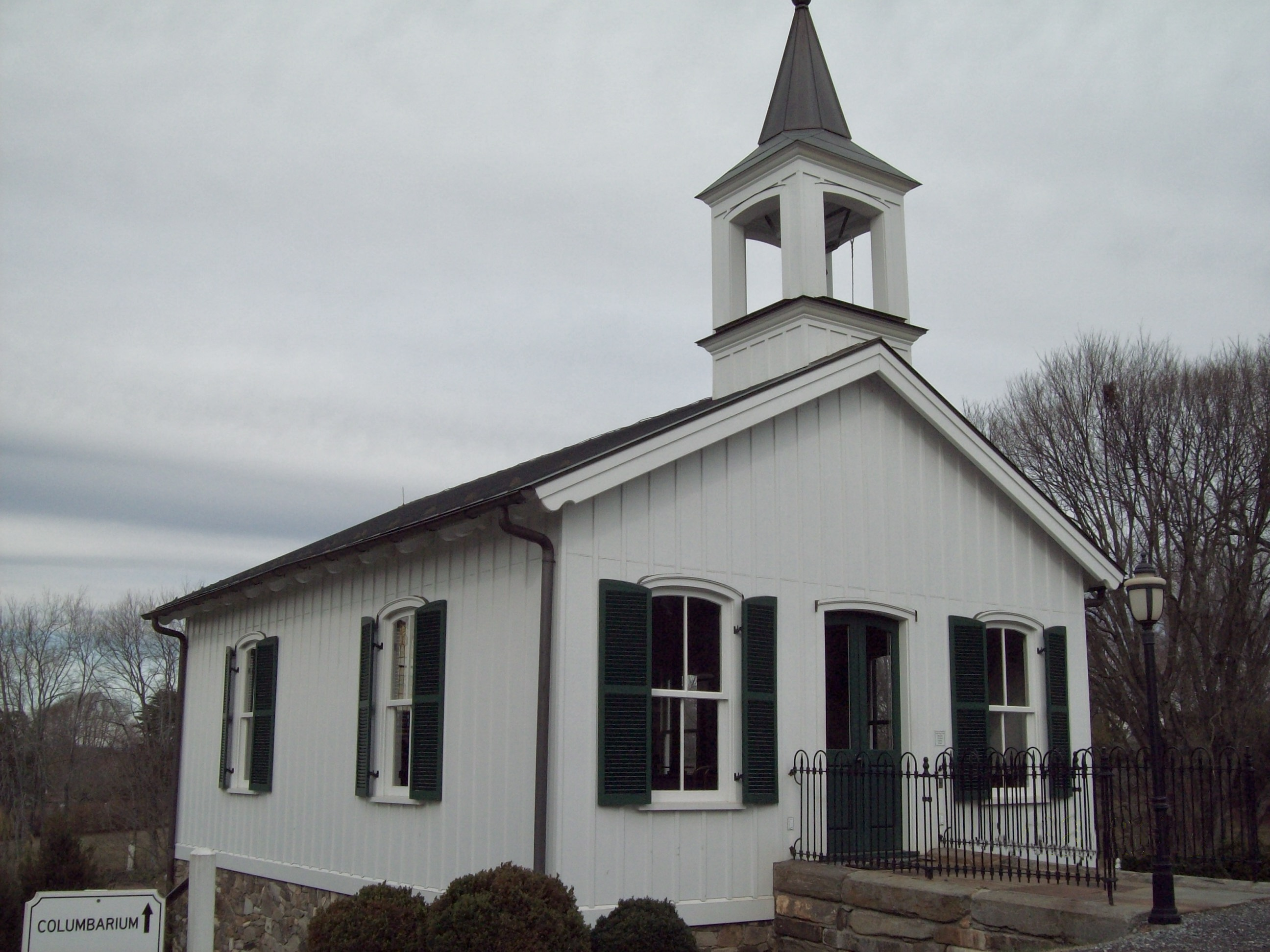
Chapel and Columbarium, Old City Cemetery, Lynchburg VA, November 2008
