= Samuel Phillips Verner =

American missionary and explorer (1873–1943)

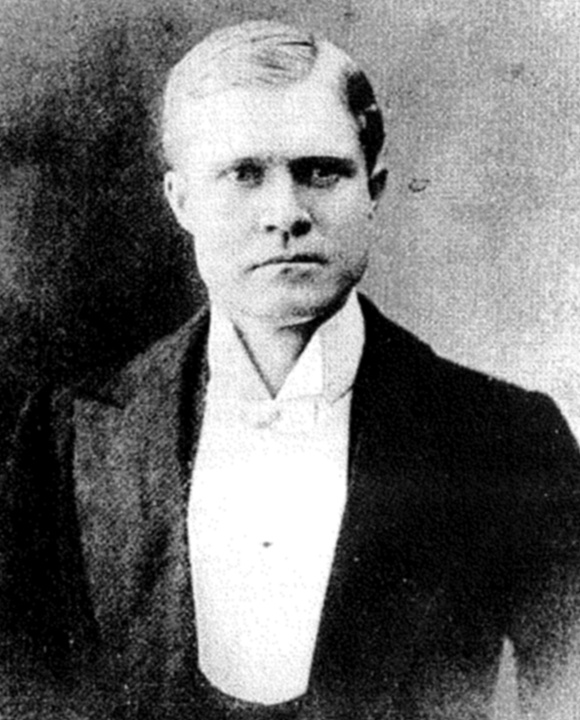
- Born: Samuel Phillips Verner; November 14, 1873
- Died: October 9, 1943 (aged 69)
- Resting place: Davidson River Cemetery, Transylvania County, North Carolina

Samuel Phillips Verner (14 November 1873 – 9 October 1943) was an American missionary and explorer in the Congo Free State. Verner is best known for his engagement in trade of African animals and wares that were unavailable in the United States at the time and for being commissioned to exhibit African tribespeople for the human zoo at the Louisiana Purchase Exposition of 1904 in St. Louis, Missouri.

The best known among Verner's acquisitions was Ota Benga, the sole survivor of his clan, whom Verner bought from African slave traders and brought to the United States. Benga became one of the most popular attractions, referred to as "human spectacles", at the Exposition's human zoo and he was later featured in the Bronx Zoo until late 1906. Following a controversy over Benga's treatment there, George B. McClellan Jr., the mayor of New York City, ordered Benga's release while Verner received criticism for his negligent concession to the Bronx Zoo.

== Biography ==
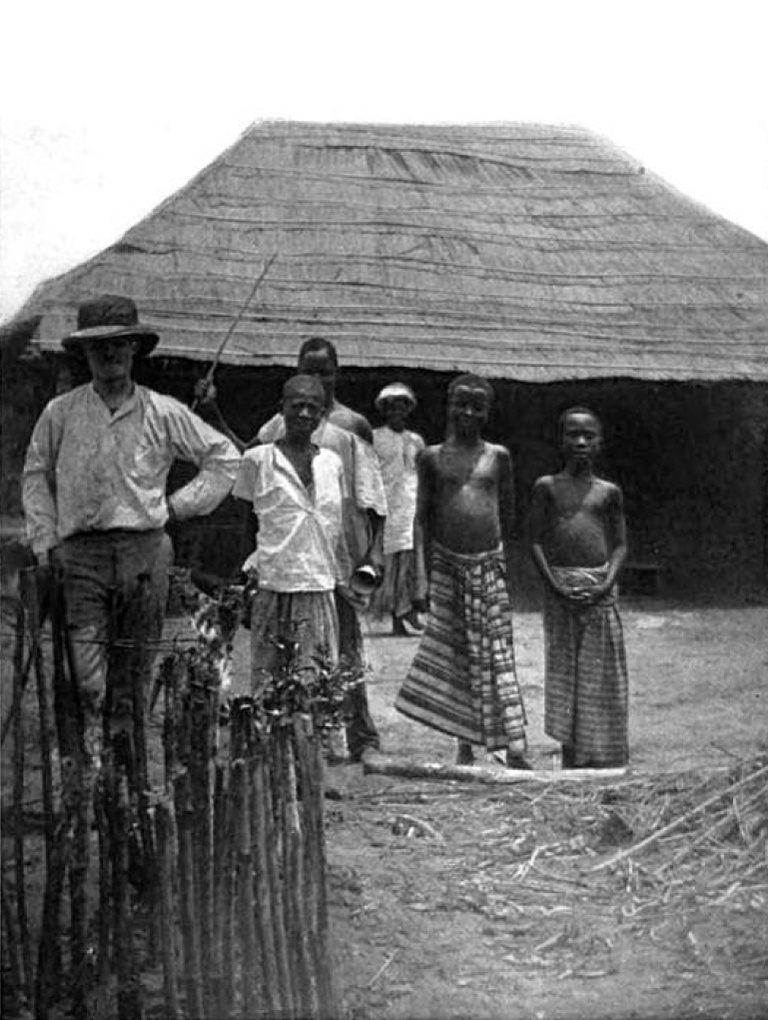
Verner in Congo, 1902

The first son of a South Carolina slave-holding family, he studied in Columbia and then went to the University of South Carolina graduating in 1892 as the best of his class. Following a mental breakdown he worked as a laborer in the railroads for about a year. He then moved to work for his uncle A.L. Phillips in Tuscaloosa, Alabama.

Here he taught at the Stillman Institute of which his uncle was a superintendent. He had begun to read the works of David Livingstone and Henry Morton Stanley on African travels and got in touch with the family of Samuel N. Lapsley, the first Presbyterian missionary who died in the Congo.

He decided to move to Africa in 1895 on appeals from Dr S.H. Chester who was the secretary for the Foreign Missions of the Presbyterian Church. Verner was ordained under an extraordinary clause on 25 September 1895 at the Tuscaloosa Presbytery after an examination in various subjects. He and Joseph Phipps sailed from New York to London aboard New York and from Southampton to Antwerp and finally aboard the R.M.S. Roquelle to Matadi in Congo.

Verner stayed in the Congo and studied the Tshiluba language.

On 15 December 1897 while out on a hill near Ndombe he fell into a trap for animals and was pierced by a poisoned stake. His African assistant, Kassongo, ran to the nearby village of Bindundu and he was treated by a medicine woman. After two weeks he returned to Ndombe and he would continue to recuperate for a year later in Baltimore. The account of his injury has been questioned by Pamela Newkirk in her book. She also notes that Verner left at least two children that he fathered with a Congolese woman in Luebo.

In 1898 he brought three Congolese assistants who he intended to teach English and other skills before returning them. This included Kassongo, who was killed in a stampede in 1902 at Birmingham where he went to hear Booker T. Washington speak.

Samuel Phillips Verner resigned from missionary work in 1899. In the 1900s he made further visits to bring African peoples to the United States.

Verner wrote articles based on his African experiences and was considered an expert among others on the Pygmies and on various matters of African colonialism. Verner became a friend of William Temple Hornaday to whom he brought chimpanzees.

Verner had been hired by the St. Louis Exposition Company to procure specimens of African natives for the Louisiana Purchase Exposition and World's Fair of 1904. Verner bought 12 people, among them Ota Benga, from near the confluence of the Kasai and Sankuru rivers. In 1903, Benga's village was burned and his tribe slaughtered by Force Publique, who were supported by the Belgian government. Benga had been away on a hunting trip when this occurred, and when he returned he was captured and sold to Verner.

Verner arranged that Ota Benga would be displayed at the Bronx Zoo. First the show attracted visitors, but the conditions of Ota Benga degraded until he was treated like a captive. The situation generated outrage among African-Americans and they obtained his release from Mayor George B. McClellan Jr. Benga eventually killed himself in 1916 after he was unable to secure passage back to Africa.

Verner was compared to Dr. David Livingstone, and even described as his reincarnation. He was revered by many Christians because they viewed him as introducing Congo natives to Christian standards of morality, particularly sexual taboos.

In 1906, after the World Fair concluded, Verner was financially struggling. He sold off his animals, artifacts, and the Africans he held as captives. He sold Benga to William T. Hornaday.

Verner may have been subject of controversy due to some aspects of his activities in contradiction to the nationwide ban in the United States implemented under the Thirteenth Amendment. Earlier national laws had greatly restricted slavery in the United States. These include the Act Prohibiting Importation of Slaves on 1 January 1808, that made it a felony to import slaves from abroad, but not from stateless countries. Verner claimed that Benga was free and that he did not gain from the exhibition of Benga at the zoo.

Verner appears to have gone into obscurity after the Ota Benga affair. In 1912, a patent application for a trapezoidal animal trap gives his address as living in the Obispo Panama canal area.

A book on Ota Benga was written by Verner's grandson Phillips Verner Bradford.
