= Ota Benga =

Mbuti pygmy featured in an exhibit in 1904

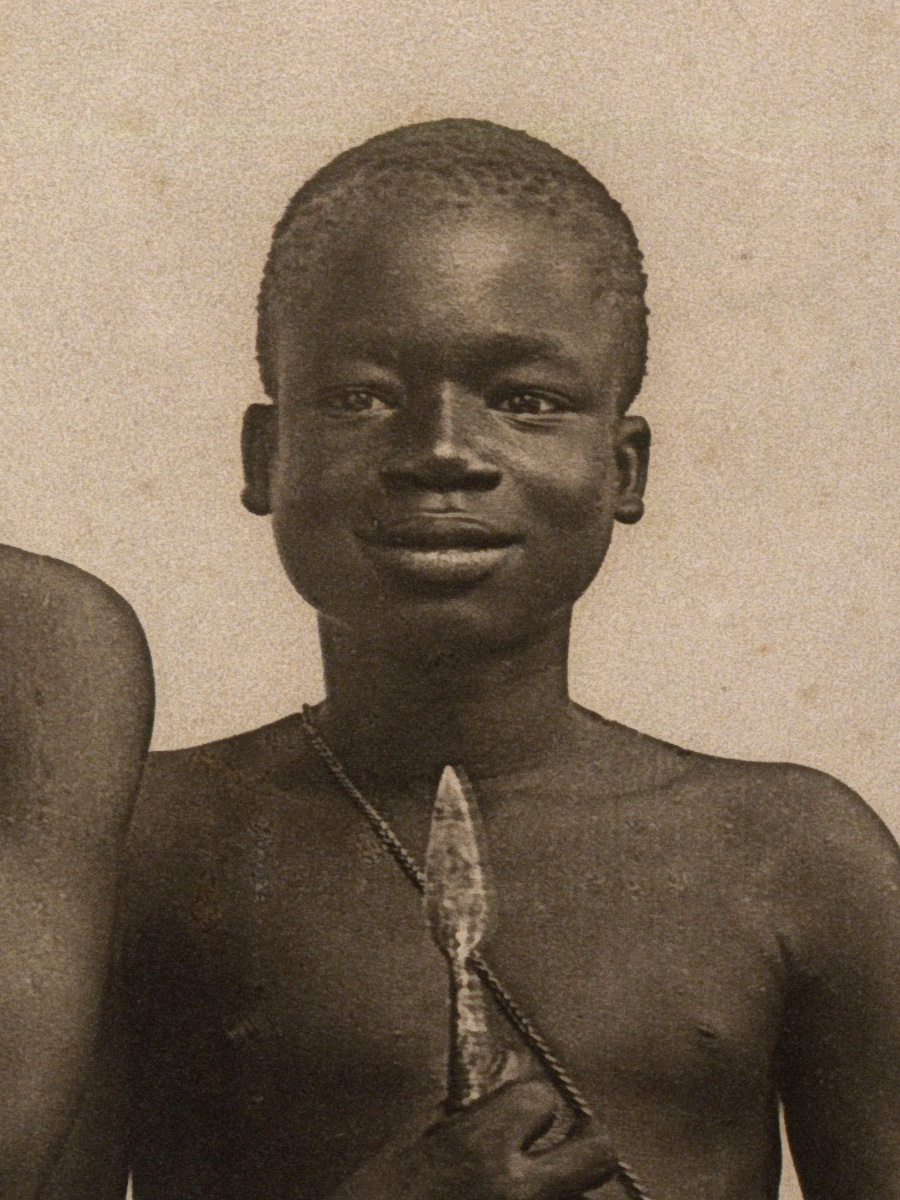
- Benga at the St. Louis World's Fair, 1904
- Born: Mbye Otabenga c. 1883; Kasaï region, Congo Free State
- Died: March 20, 1916 (aged 32–33); Lynchburg, Virginia, U.S.
- Cause of death: Suicide
- Resting place: White Rock Cemetery, Lynchburg, Virginia; 37°23′56.23″N 79°7′58.41″W

Ota Benga (c. 1883 – March 20, 1916) was a Mbuti (Congo pygmy) former slave and performer at an exhibit at the 1904 Louisiana Purchase Exposition in St. Louis, Missouri, and as a human zoo exhibit in 1906 at the Bronx Zoo. Benga had been purchased from native African slave traders by Samuel Phillips Verner, a businessman searching for African people for the exhibition, who brought him to the United States and hired him for stagework. While at the Bronx Zoo, Benga was allowed to walk the grounds before and after he was exhibited in the zoo's Monkey House. Benga was placed in a cage with an orangutan, regarded as both an offense to his humanity and a promotion of social Darwinism.

To enhance the primitive image and presumably protect himself if need be from the ape, he was given a functional bow and arrow. He used this instead to shoot at visitors who mocked him and partially as a result of this the exhibition was ended. Except for a brief visit to Africa with Verner after the close of the St. Louis fair, Benga lived in the United States, mostly in Virginia, for the rest of his life.

African-American newspapers around the nation published editorials strongly opposing Benga's treatment. Robert Stuart MacArthur, spokesman for a delegation of black churches, petitioned New York City mayor George B. McClellan Jr. for his release from the Bronx Zoo. In late 1906, the mayor released Benga to the custody of James H. Gordon, who supervised the Howard Colored Orphan Asylum in Brooklyn.

In 1910, Gordon arranged for Benga to be cared for in Lynchburg, Virginia, where he paid for his clothes and to have his sharpened teeth capped. This would enable Benga to be more readily accepted in local society. Benga was tutored in English and began to work at a Lynchburg tobacco factory.

He tried to return to Africa, but the outbreak of World War I in 1914 stopped all passenger ship travel. Benga developed depression and died by suicide in 1916.

== Early life ==
As a member of the Mbuti people, Ota Benga lived in equatorial forests near the Kasai River in what was then the Congo Free State. His people were attacked by the Force Publique, established by King Leopold II of Belgium as a militia to oppress the Indigenous people and communities, most of whom were used as forced laborers in the extraction and exploitation of Congo's massive supply of rubber. Benga's wife and two children were slaughtered; he survived because he was on a hunting expedition when the Force Publique attacked his village. He was later captured by slave traders from the enemy "Baschelel" (Bashilele) tribe.

In 1904, American businessman and explorer Samuel Phillips Verner traveled to Africa, under contract from the Louisiana Purchase Exposition, to bring back an assortment of pygmies to be part of an exhibition. Verner came across Benga while en route to a Batwa pygmy village visited previously. He purchased Benga from the Bashilele slave traders, giving them a pound of salt and a bolt of cloth in exchange. Verner later claimed he had rescued Benga from cannibals.

The two spent several weeks together before reaching the Batwa village. The villagers did not trust the muzungu ("white man"). Verner was unable to recruit any villagers to join him for travel to the United States until Benga said that the muzungu had saved his life, and spoke of the bond that had grown between them and his own curiosity about the world Verner came from. Four Batwa, all male, ultimately decided to accompany them. Verner also recruited other Africans who were not pygmies: five men from the Bakuba, including the son of King Ndombe, ruler of the Bakuba; and other related peoples.

== Exhibitions ==
=== St. Louis World Fair ===
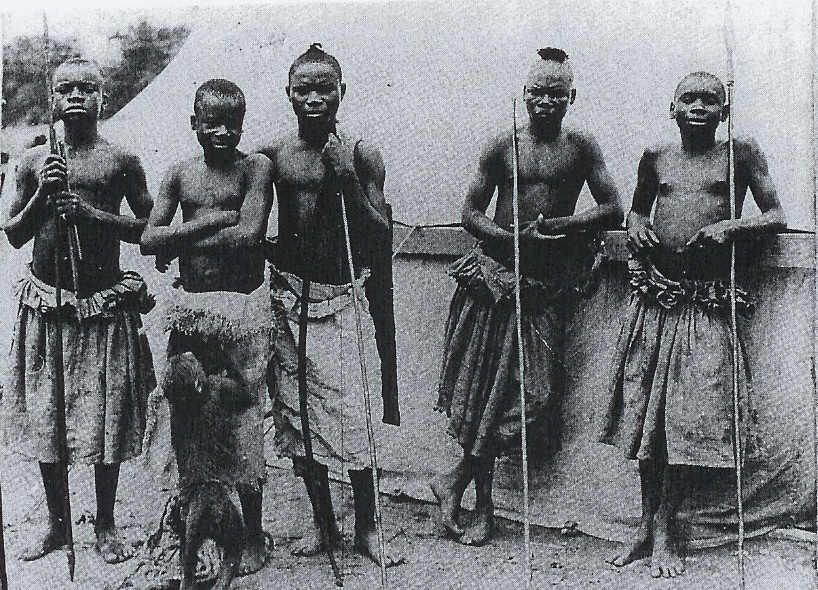
Benga (second from left) and the Batwa in St. Louis

The group was taken to St. Louis, Missouri, in late June 1904 without Verner, as he had been taken ill with malaria. The Louisiana Purchase Exposition had already begun, and the Africans immediately became the center of attention. Benga was particularly popular, and his name was reported variously by the press as Artiba, Autobank, Ota Bang, and Otabenga. He had an amiable personality, and visitors were eager to see his teeth that had been filed to sharp points in his early youth as ritual decoration. The Africans learned to charge for photographs and performances. One newspaper account promoted Benga as "the only genuine African cannibal in America", and claimed that "[his teeth were] worth the five cents he charges for showing them to visitors".

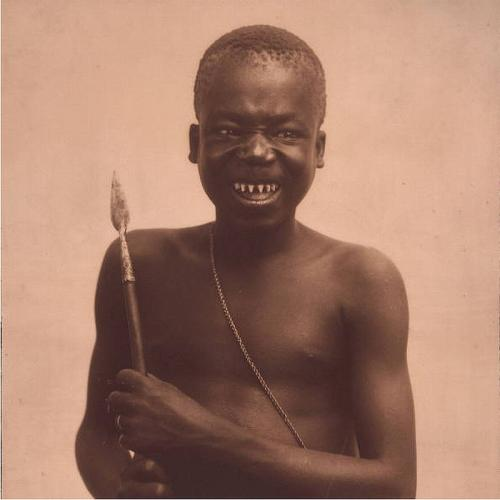
Benga in 1904

When Verner arrived a month later, he realized the pygmies were more prisoners than performers. Their attempts to congregate peacefully in the forest on Sundays were thwarted by the crowds' fascination with them. McGee's attempts to present a "serious" scientific exhibit were also overturned. On July 28, 1904, the Africans performed to the crowd's preconceived notion that they were "savages", resulting in the First Illinois Regiment being called in to control the mob. Benga and the other Africans eventually performed in a warlike fashion, imitating Native Americans they saw at the Exhibition. The Apache leader Geronimo (featured as "The Human Tyger" – with special dispensation from the Department of War) grew to admire Benga, and gave him one of his arrowheads.

=== American Museum of Natural History ===
Benga accompanied Verner when he returned the other Africans to the Congo. He briefly lived amongst the Batwa while continuing to accompany Verner on his African adventures. He married a Batwa woman who later died of snakebite, but little is known of this second marriage. Not feeling that he belonged with the Batwa, Benga chose to return with Verner to the United States.

Verner eventually arranged for Benga to stay in a spare room at the American Museum of Natural History in New York City while he was tending to other business. Verner negotiated with the curator Henry Bumpus over the presentation of his acquisitions from Africa and potential employment. While Bumpus was put off by Verner's request of what he thought was the prohibitively high salary of $175 a month and was not impressed by the man's credentials, he was interested in Benga. Benga initially enjoyed his time at the museum, where he was given a Southern-style linen suit to wear when he entertained, but he became homesick for his own culture.

In 1992 the writers Bradford and Blume imagined his feelings:

What at first held his attention now made him want to flee. It was maddening to be inside – to be swallowed whole – so long. He had an image of himself, stuffed, behind glass, but somehow still alive, crouching over a fake campfire, feeding meat to a lifeless child. Museum silence became a source of torment, a kind of noise; he needed birdsong, breezes, trees.

The disaffected Benga attempted to find relief by exploiting his employers' presentation of him as a 'savage'. He tried to slip past the guards as a large crowd was leaving the premises; when asked on one occasion to seat a wealthy donor's wife, he pretended to misunderstand, instead hurling the chair across the room, just missing the woman's head. Meanwhile, Verner was struggling financially and had made little progress in his negotiations with the museum. He soon found another home for Benga.

=== Bronx Zoo ===
At the suggestion of Bumpus, Verner took Benga to the Bronx Zoo in 1906. William Hornaday, director of the zoo, initially enlisted Benga to help maintain the animal habitats. However, because Hornaday saw that people took more notice of Benga than they did of the animals at the zoo, he eventually created an exhibition to feature Benga. At the zoo, Benga was allowed to roam the grounds, but there is no record that he was ever paid for his work. He became fond of an orangutan named Dohong, "the presiding genius of the Monkey House", who had been taught to perform tricks and imitate human behavior.

The events leading to his "exhibition" alongside Dohong were gradual: Benga spent some of his time in the Monkey House exhibit, and the zoo encouraged him to hang his hammock there, and to shoot his bow and arrow at a target. On the first day of the exhibit, September 8, 1906, visitors found Benga in the Monkey House.

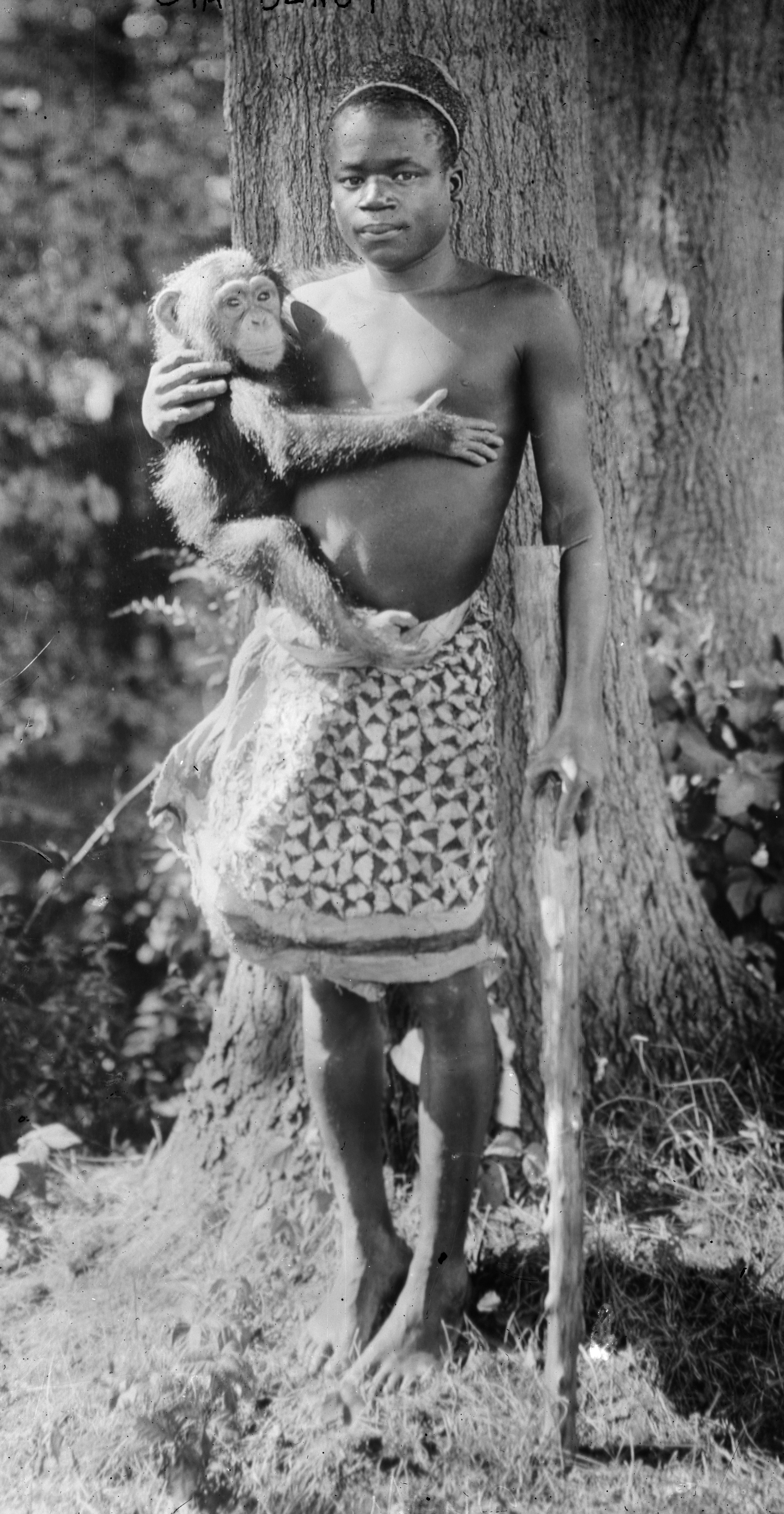
Ota Benga at the Bronx Zoo, with Polly the chimpanzee Verner brought from the Congo, in 1906. Only five promotional photos exist of Benga's time here, none of them in the "Monkey House"; cameras were not allowed.

Soon, a sign on the exhibit read:

The African Pygmy, "Ota Benga."

Age, 23 years. Height, 4 feet 11 inches.
Weight, 103 pounds. Brought from the
Kasai River, Congo Free State, South Cen-
tral Africa, by Dr. Samuel P. Verner. Ex-
hibited each afternoon during September.

Hornaday considered the exhibit a valuable spectacle for visitors and was supported by Madison Grant, Secretary of the New York Zoological Society, who lobbied to put Ota Benga on display alongside apes at the Bronx Zoo. A decade later, Grant became prominent nationally as a racial anthropologist and eugenicist.

African-American clergymen immediately protested to zoo officials about the exhibit. Said James H. Gordon,

Our race, we think, is depressed enough, without exhibiting one of us with the apes ... We think we are worthy of being considered human beings, with souls.

Gordon thought the exhibit was hostile to Christianity and was effectively a promotion of Darwinism:

The Darwinian theory is absolutely opposed to Christianity, and a public demonstration in its favor should not be permitted.

A number of clergymen backed Gordon. In defense of the depiction of Benga as a lesser human, an editorial in the New York Times suggested:

We do not quite understand all the emotion which others are expressing in the matter. ... It is absurd to make moan over the imagined humiliation and degradation Benga is suffering. The pygmies ... are very low in the human scale, and the suggestion that Benga should be in a school instead of a cage ignores the high probability that school would be a place ... from which he could draw no advantage whatever. The idea that men are all much alike except as they have had or lacked opportunities for getting an education out of books is now far out of date.

After the controversy, Benga was allowed to roam the grounds of the zoo. In response to the situation, as well as verbal and physical prods from the crowds, he became more mischievous and somewhat violent. Around this time, an article in the New York Times quoted Robert Stuart MacArthur as saying, "It is too bad that there is not some society like the Society for the Prevention of Cruelty to Children. We send our missionaries to Africa to Christianize the people, and then we bring one here to brutalize him."

The zoo finally removed Benga from the grounds. Verner was unsuccessful in his continued search for employment, but he occasionally spoke to Benga. The two had agreed that it was in Benga's best interests to remain in the United States despite the unwelcome spotlight at the zoo.

Toward the end of 1906, Benga was released into Reverend Gordon's custody.

== Later life ==
Gordon placed Benga in the Howard Colored Orphan Asylum, a church-sponsored orphanage in Brooklyn that Gordon supervised. As the unwelcome press attention continued, in January 1910, Gordon arranged for Benga's relocation to Lynchburg, Virginia, where he lived with the family of Gregory W. Hayes. He adopted the name Otto Bingo during his residence there.

So that he could more easily be part of local society, Gordon arranged for Benga's teeth to be capped and bought him American-style clothes. He received tutoring from Lynchburg poet Anne Spencer in order to improve his English, and began to attend elementary school at the Baptist Seminary in Lynchburg. He reportedly met W.E.B Du Bois and Booker T. Washington through Spencer.

Once he felt his English had improved sufficiently, Benga discontinued his formal education. He began working at a Lynchburg tobacco factory, and began to plan a return to Africa.

== Death ==
In 1914, when World War I broke out, a return to the Belgian Congo became impossible as passenger ship traffic ended. Benga became depressed as his hopes for a return to his homeland faded. On March 20, 1916, at the age of 32 or 33, he built a ceremonial fire, undressed, and chipped off the caps on his teeth. Benga sang and danced around the fire before taking out a borrowed pistol and shooting himself in the heart.

Benga was buried in an unmarked grave in the Black section of the Old City Cemetery, near his benefactor, Gregory Hayes. At some point, the remains of both men went missing. Local oral history indicates that Hayes and Benga were eventually moved from the Old Cemetery to White Rock Hill Cemetery, a burial ground that later fell into disrepair. Benga received a historic marker in Lynchburg in 2017.

== Legacy ==
Phillips Verner Bradford, the grandson of Samuel Phillips Verner, together with author Harvey Blume wrote a book on Benga, entitled Ota Benga: The Pygmy in the Zoo (1992). During his research for the book, Bradford visited the American Museum of Natural History, which holds a life mask and body cast of Ota Benga. The display is still labeled "Pygmy", rather than indicating Benga's name, despite objections beginning a century ago from Verner and repeated by others. Publication of Bradford's book in 1992 inspired widespread interest in Ota Benga's story and stimulated creation of many other works, both fictional and non-fiction, such as:

- 1994 – John Strand's play, Ota Benga, was produced by the Signature Theater in Arlington, Virginia.
- 1997 – The play, Ota Benga, Elegy for the Elephant, by Dr. Ben B. Halm, was staged at Fairfield University in Connecticut.
- 2002 – The Mbuti man was the subject of the short documentary, Ota Benga: A Pygmy in America, directed by Brazilian Alfeu França. He incorporated original movies recorded by Verner in the early 20th century.
- 2005 – A fictionalized account of his life portrayed in the film Man to Man, starring Joseph Fiennes, Kristin Scott Thomas.
- 2006 – The Brooklyn-based band Piñataland released a song titled "Ota Benga's Name" on their album Songs from the Forgotten Future Volume 1, which tells the story of Ota Benga.
- 2007 – McCray's early poems about Benga were adapted as a performance piece; the work debuted at the Columbia Museum of Art in 2007, with McCray as narrator and original music by Kevin Simmonds.
- 2008 – Benga inspired the character of Ngunda Oti in the film The Curious Case of Benjamin Button.
- 2010 – The story of Ota Benga was the inspiration for a concept album by the St. Louis musical ensemble May Day Orchestra
- 2012 – Ota Benga Under My Mother's Roof, a poetry collection, was published by Carrie Allen McCray, whose family had taken care of Benga
- 2012 – Ota Benga the Documentary Film appeared
- 2015 – Journalist Pamela Newkirk published the biography Spectacle: The Astonishing Life of Ota Benga
- 2016 – Radio Diaries, a Peabody Award-winning radio show, tells the story of Ota Benga in "The Man in the Zoo" on the Radio Diaries podcast.
- 2019 – The University of Alabama at Birmingham adapted Ota Benga's story into the musical Savage.
- 2019 – Williamstown Theatre Festival premiered A Human Being, of a Sort, a play based on Ota Benga's story, written by Jonathan Payne.
- 2020 – The Wildlife Conservation Society, operator of the Bronx Zoo, apologized for the zoo's treatment of Benga and promotion of eugenics.

== Similar case ==
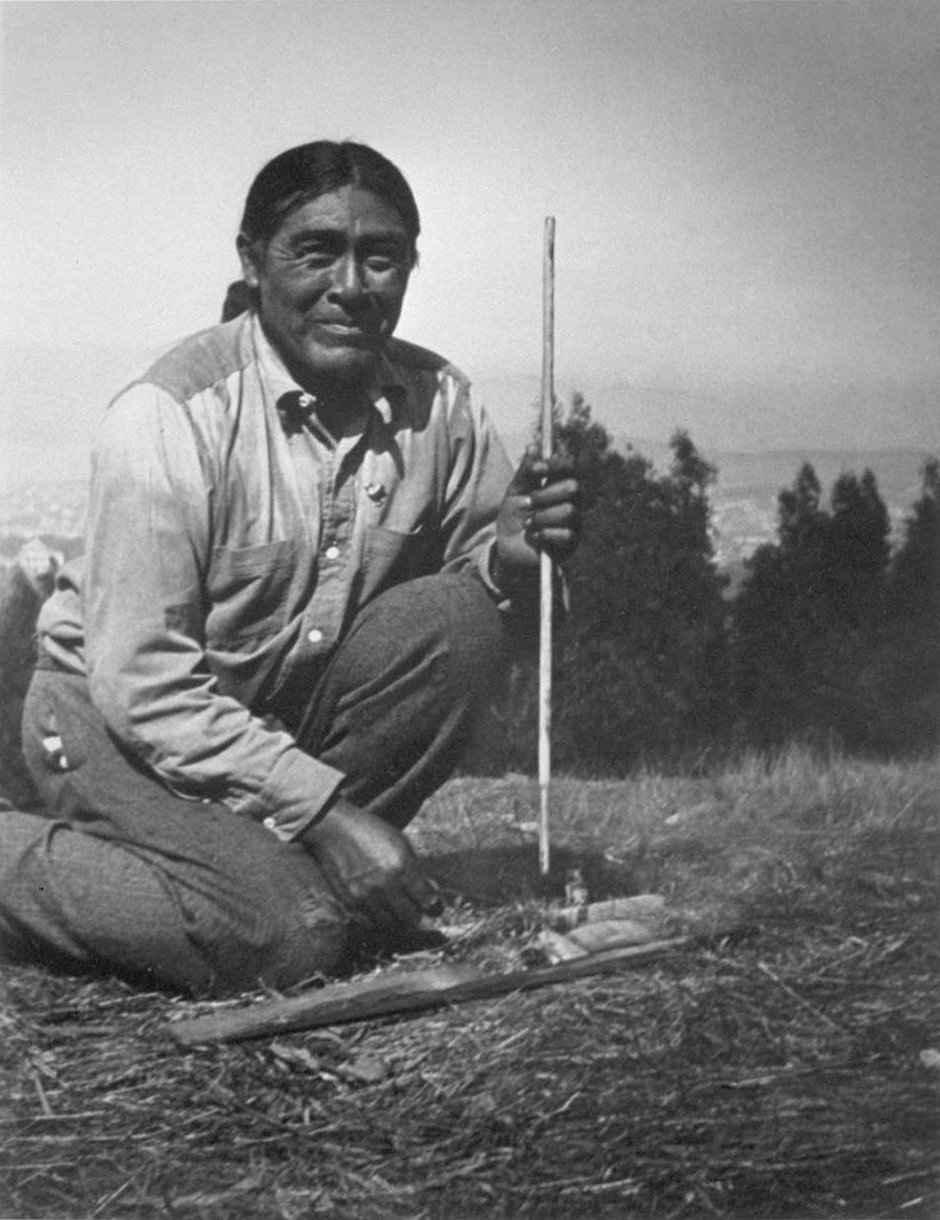
Ishi, a Native American who has been compared to Benga

Similarities have been observed between the treatment of Ota Benga and Ishi, the sole remaining member of the Yahi Native American tribe, who was displayed in California around the same period. Ishi died on March 25, 1916, five days after Ota's death.

== See also ==
- Saartjie Baartman, called the "Hottentot Venus"
- Human zoo

== Bibliography ==
- Adams, Rachel (2001). Sideshow U.S.A: Freaks and the American Cultural Imagination. Chicago: University of Chicago Press. ISBN 978-0-226-00539-3.
- Bradford, Phillips Verner; Blume, Harvey (1992). Ota Benga: The Pygmy in the Zoo. New York: St. Martins Press. ISBN 978-0-312-08276-5.
- McCray, Carrie Allen (2012). Kevin Simmonds (ed.). Ota Benga under My Mother's Roof. Columbia: University of South Carolina Press. ISBN 978-1-61117-085-6.
- Newkirk, Pamela (2015). Spectacle: The Astonishing Life of Ota Benga. New York: Amistad. ISBN 978-0-06-220100-3.
- Parezo, Nancy J.; Fowler, Don D. (2007). Anthropology Goes to the Fair: The 1904 Louisiana Purchase Exposition. Lincoln: University of Nebraska Press. ISBN 978-0-8032-3759-9.
- Smith, Ken (1998). Raw Deal: Horrible and Ironic Stories of Forgotten Americans. New York: Blast Books. ISBN 978-0-922233-20-5.
- Spiro, Jonathan Peter (2008). Defending the Master Race: Conservation, Eugenics, and the Legacy of Madison Grant. Burlington: University of Vermont Press. pp. 43–51. ISBN 978-1-58465-715-6.
