= Calvary Baptist Church (Manhattan) =

Church in Manhattan, New York

Coordinates: 40.765197°N 73.978431°W

The entrance to Calvary Baptist Church on West 57th Street

Calvary Baptist Church is a Baptist church at 123 West 57th Street, near Carnegie Hall in Midtown Manhattan, New York City. Founded in 1847, the congregation has been based on West 57th Street since 1883 and was an early religious broadcaster, starting its own radio station in 1923. Its current home, which it owns, occupies the lower six floors and two basement levels of a 30-story tower built on the site of its former building, with a 700-seat sanctuary.

== History ==
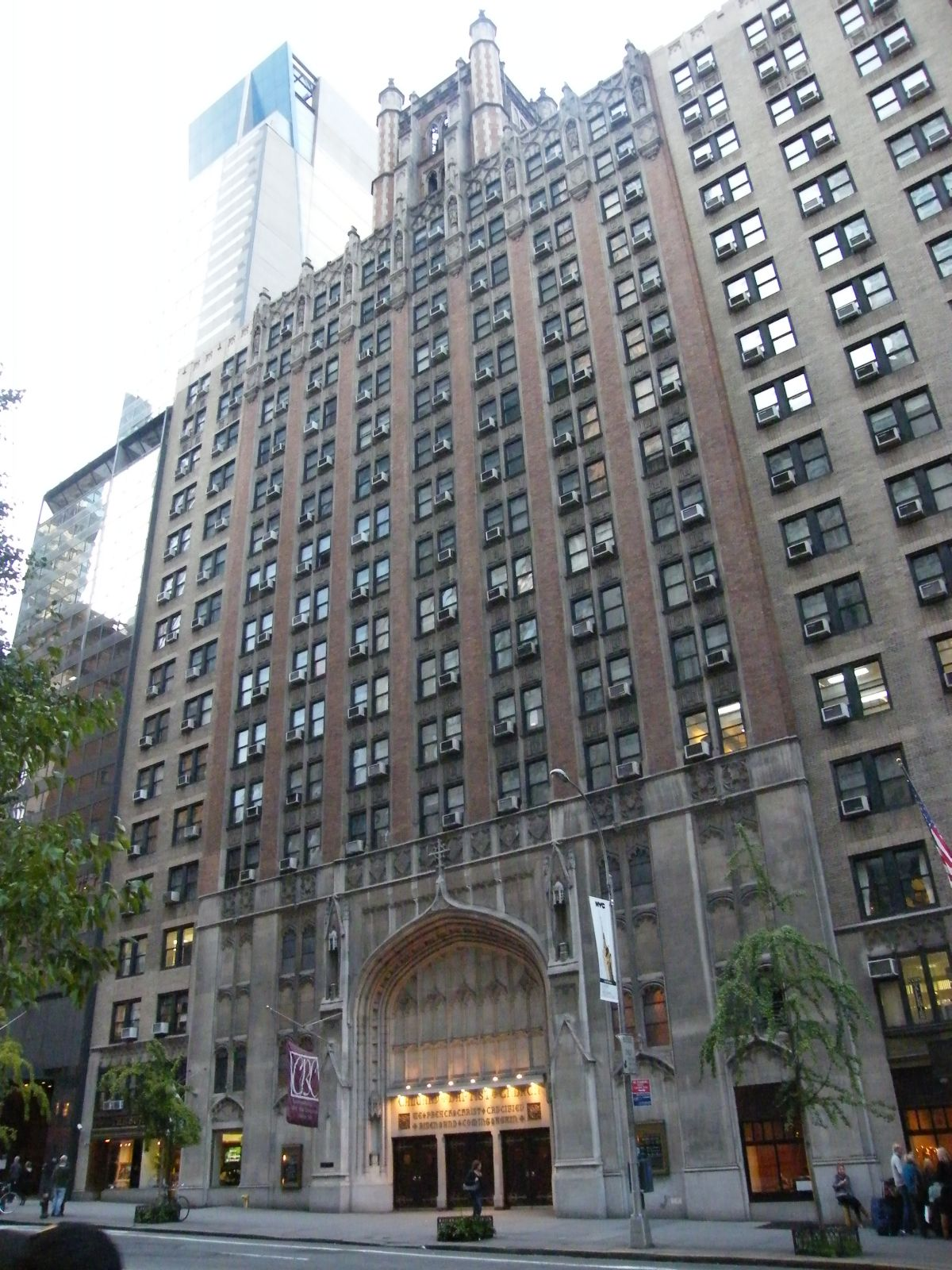
The church's former building (1931–2022), an early "skyscraper" church at 123 West 57th Street

The church was founded in 1847, and its first sanctuary was at 50 West 23rd Street, completed in 1854. It then moved to a red sandstone Gothic church designed by John Rochester Thomas at its current location, which was built in 1883–1884. It also had a chapel at 223 West 67th Street, which was later used by St. Matthew's Roman Catholic Church.

In 1923, Calvary became one of the earliest churches to operate its own radio station and has since maintained a long tradition of widely followed religious broadcasts. Its weekly program, Tell It From Calvary, was carried on WMCA as of 2020 and is now distributed as a weekly sermon podcast.

The building at 123 West 57th Street was an early example of an urban high-rise, or "skyscraper", church, a 16-story building which also included the Hotel Salisbury, an apartment hotel. Planning for the edifice began in 1929, with the design credited to the firm of Jardine, Hill & Murdock, and the building was dedicated in 1931. The pianist Van Cliburn, a resident of the hotel, was a member of the church. The evangelists Billy Sunday and Billy Graham both preached at Calvary.

In 2019, the church reached an agreement with the developers Alchemy-ABR Investment Partners to replace its building with a new tower containing offices, shops, and a church, in which the church would own its own space as a condominium. The Salisbury Hotel closed in 2020. After a delay caused by the COVID-19 pandemic in New York City, the redevelopment deal closed in 2021, and construction of the new building was under way by late 2022. During construction, the congregation met in temporary space on the Upper West Side.

The church's entrance on 57th Street (2026)

The 30-story tower at 125 West 57th Street, designed by FXCollaborative, was completed in early 2026. The church occupies the tower's lower six floors and two basement levels, with its own entrance on 57th Street. Its facilities include a 700-seat sanctuary, classrooms, and a fellowship hall.

== Senior pastors ==
- 1847-1849 David Bellamy
- 1850-1852 John Dowling
- 1852-1863 A. D. Gillette
- 1864-1869 R. J. W. Buckland
- 1870-1911 Robert Stuart MacArthur
- 1915-1917 Joseph W. Kemp
- 1918-1929 John Roach Straton. During his tenure, Calvary was nationally known as a center for fundamentalism and efforts to reform society in his vision of Bible-based morality.
- 1930-1934 Will H. Houghton Houghton resigned from Calvary's pulpit to serve as the fourth president of Moody Bible Institute in Chicago, IL.
- 1936-1949 William Ward Ayer
- 1950-1957 John Summerfield Wimbish
- 1959-1973 Stephen F. Olford A close friend and adviser of Billy Graham, Olford founded the New York School of the Bible in 1971.
- 1976-1986 Dr. Donald R. Hubbard
- 1989-1994 James O. Rose Jr.
- 1997–2018 David Paul Epstein, brother of the television host Kathie Lee Gifford
- 2022–present Abraham Joseph
