= Rudolph Aronson =

American impresario (1856–1919)

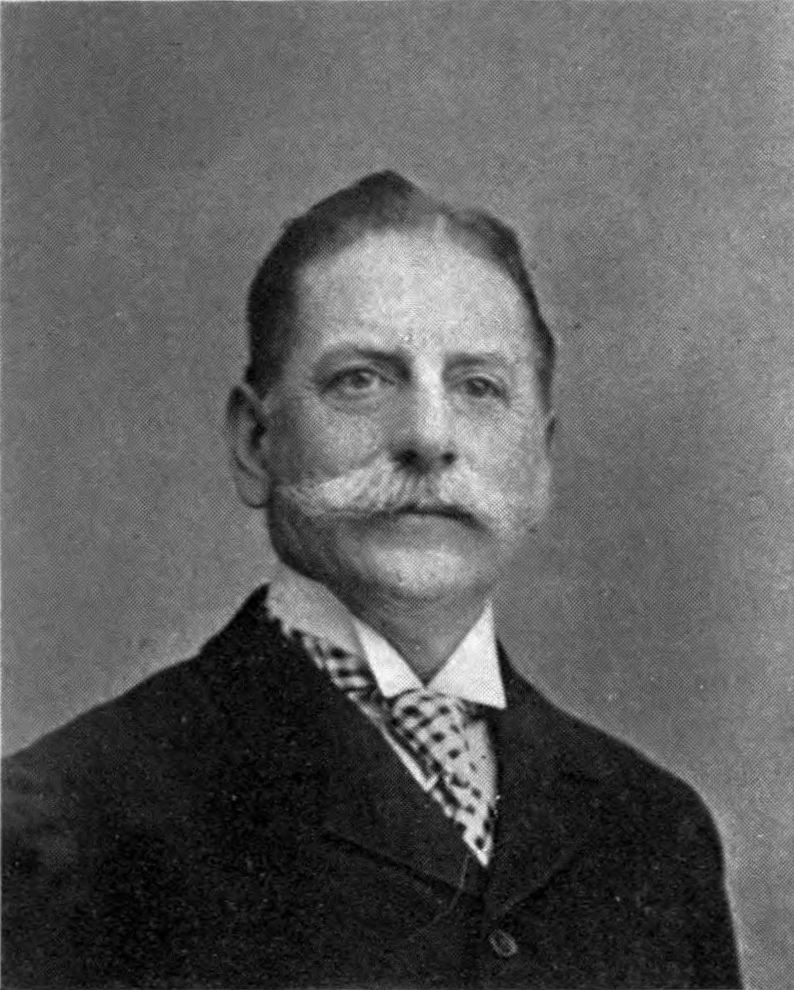
- Aronson in c. 1906
- Born: April 8, 1856; New York City, New York, U.S.
- Died: February 4, 1919 (aged 62); New York City, New York, U.S.
- Spouse: Alma D’Alma (m. 1889; div. 1896)

Signature
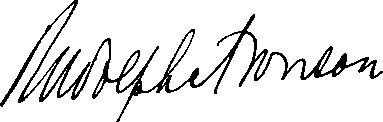

Rudolph Aronson (April 8, 1856 – February 4, 1919) was an American impresario and composer who was most notable for founding the Casino Theatre in New York City.

== Early life and education ==
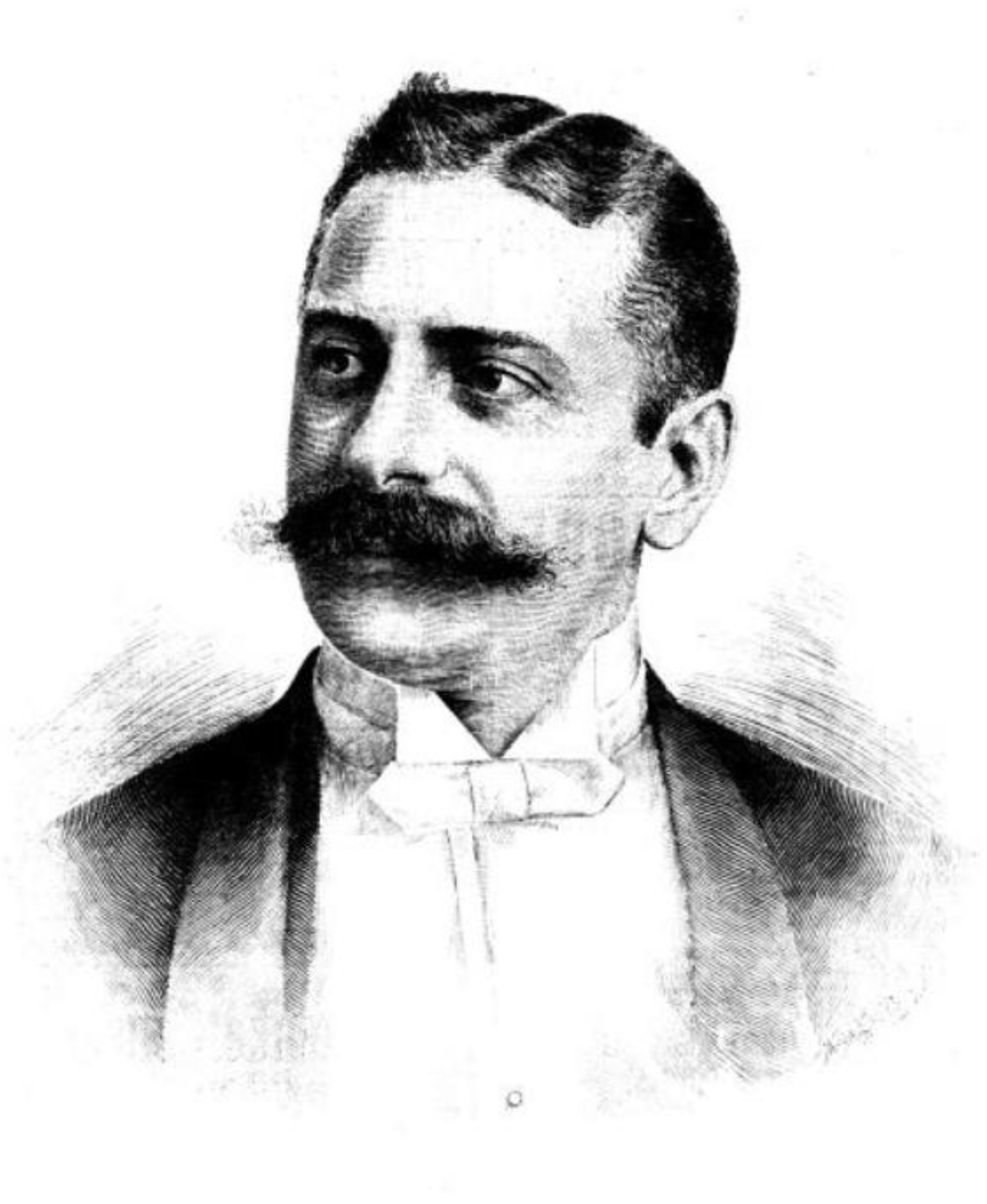
Rudolph Aronson in 1891.

Aronson was born on April 8, 1856, in New York City to German immigrants. At age six, Aronson started playing piano while attending Grammar School No. 35. Aronson later attended the Packard Business College, looking to have a business career, but his music teacher Leopold von Meyer saw his potential in a music career, persuading his parents to start his education on violin and music theory.

On July 8, 1870, Aronson attended his first concert along with his brother Joseph at the Academy of Music which was under the direction of Patrick Gilmore. One of the composers included in the concert, was Johann Strauss II, who would largely influence Aronson to pursue composing.

At age sixteen, Aronson composed his first waltz called "Arcadian", which was first performed at the Arcadian Club. The waltz was published on September 7, 1873, and was first publicly played by Theodore Thomas's orchestra at Central Park Garden.

=== European study trip ===
After the success of his waltz, Aronson felt encouraged to go to a study trip throughout Europe. Accompanied by his three sisters, Aronson left for his trip shortly after his mother's death. After arriving in Paris in 1874, Aronson became a pupil of Émile Durand at the Conservatoire de Paris where he studied harmony, counterpoint, instrumentation and musical composition for three years. While in Paris, he completed numerous compositions which most notably included the "Marche Triomphale", which was performed at the Johann Strauss Monster Concert in Berlin on June 17, 1876. In August 1876, he then travelled to Bayreuth where he experienced the first Bayreuth Festival, and later reported his experiences to the American Register of Paris.

In May 1887, upon his return from his study trip, he performed numerous of his waltzes, which were originally composed for the Centennial Exposition, at a concert in Gilmore's Garden which was organized by Patrick Gilmore.

== Founding of the Casino Theatre ==
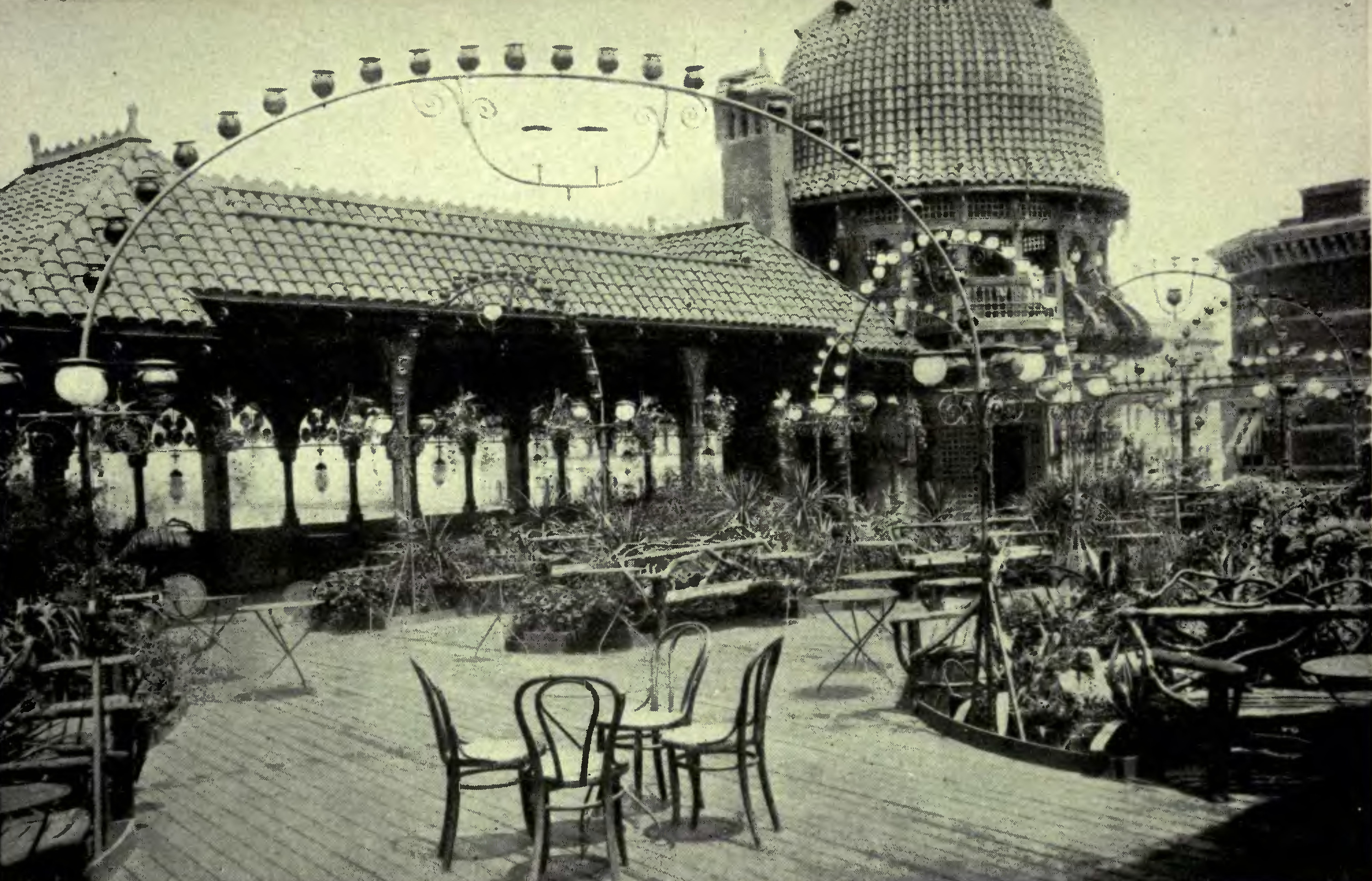
The roof garden on top of the Casino Theatre in c. 1880s

On a trip crossing the Atlantic Ocean back to New York, he met Charles D. Lanier to which he suggested the idea of a concert hall called the "European Concert Garden", to which Lanier proposed the name "The Metropolitan Concert Hall". They then enlisted the help of Joseph Seligman to establish the "Metropolitan Concert Company". The Metropolitan Concert Hall was constructed in 1880 by architect George B. Post and was modelled after other concert halls in Berlin and Vienna.

After his successful waltz "Sweet Sixteen", which reached several hundred thousand copies, he started evolving a plan of building the Casino Theatre, which he wanted to have the world's first roof garden on. He then went on another trip to Europe, where he visited many gardens including the Kroll's Garten in Berlin and the Volksgarten in Vienna, to gain inspiration for his roof garden.

Aronson returned to New York in April 1881, and began raising capital by suggesting the idea to establish a European Casino to multiple wealthy businessmen. He then established the "New York Casino Company", gaining its name from the Newport Casino. The building was then planned and designed by Francis H. Kimball and Thomas Wisedell, who were originally skeptical about the idea of a roof garden, arguing that the weight of the people would be too much for the roof to hold, yet Aronson persisted. After eventually convincing the architects, they found a way to construct the building and construction was started in December 1881.

In January 1882, Aronson made another trip to Europe to further gain attraction for his theatre. He at first visited Johann Strauss II and then Émile Waldteufel, who both declined upon the request to perform at his theatre.

Returning from Europe in April 1882, Aronson wanted the building to be completed as fast as possible, hurrying the architects. The building was completed on September 11, 1882, and was visited multiple times by poet Edwin Arnold who said it "was the finest example of Moorish architecture he had encountered". On October 22, 1882, the first concert was held by Maurice Grau's opera companies and an orchestra consisting of sixty musicians under Aronson's conductorship.

== Later life ==
Aronson built and managed hotels throughout New York and Puerto Rico until his death on February 4, 1919.

== References and sources ==
=== Sources ===
- Aronson, Rudolph (1913). Theatrical and Musical Memoirs. New York: McBride, Nast & Co. ISBN 978-1-34665-648-9.
