= John Roach Straton =

American pastor (1875–1929)

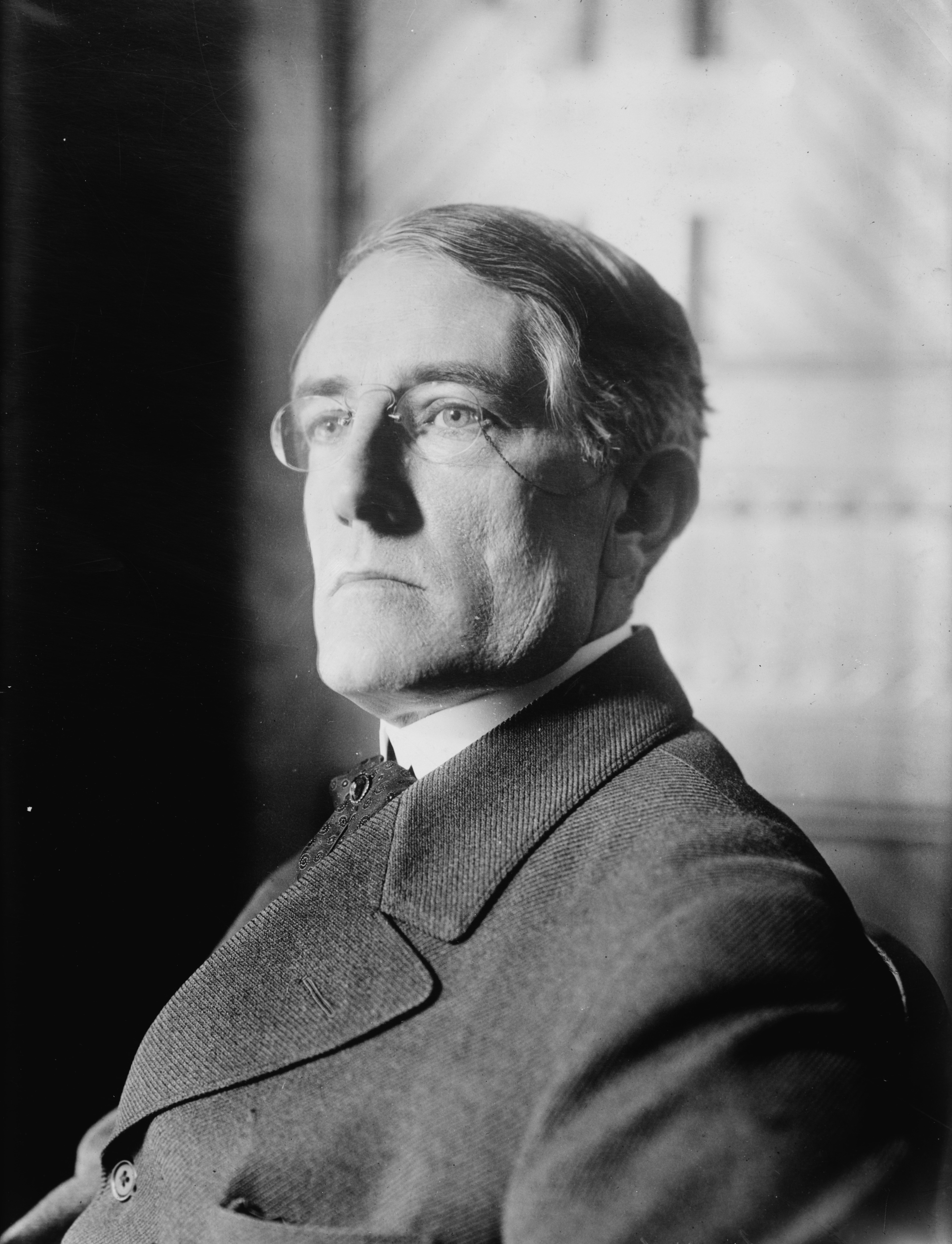
- Straton circa 1919
- Born: April 6, 1875; Evansville, Indiana
- Died: October 29, 1929 (aged 54); Clifton Springs, New York
- Known for: Antievolutionism

John Roach Straton (/ˈstreɪtən/ STRAY-tən; April 6, 1875 – October 29, 1929) was an American Fundamentalist Baptist pastor. Straton was the son of the Reverend Henry Dundas Douglas Straton and the former Julia Rebecca Carter of Virginia. He became a Christian when he was a teenager and heard the revival preaching of James Hawthorne.

== Early life and education ==
Straton graduated from Mercer University in Macon, Georgia in 1898. He also attended Southern Baptist Theological Seminary from 1902 to 1903 as well as University of Chicago and the Boston School of Oratory.

== Ministry ==
Straton was ordained in 1900 and spent most of his adult life as pastor of several churches in four major cities: Second Baptist in Chicago (1905–1908), Immanuel-Seventh Baptist in Baltimore (1908–1913), First Baptist in Norfolk, Virginia (1914–1917), and most notably of the Calvary Baptist Church in New York City 1918–1929, which was the first church to operate its own radio station."Tell It From Calvary" is a radio show that the church still produces weekly; its heard on WMCA AM570. Straton was supportive of the work of Uldine Utley, an immensely popular 14-year-old child preacher in the 1920s, and invited her to preach at Calvary Church.

Along with William Bell Riley of Minnesota, Dr. Straton was one of the foremost leaders of the anti-evolution campaign of the 1920s. For years Straton carried on a feud with the American Museum of Natural History in Manhattan, New York City because of its Hall of the Age of Man, which displayed the remains of fossilized men. Straton charged the museum with "mis-spending the taxpayers' money, and poisoning the minds of school children by false and bestial theories of evolution."

From December 1923 to May 1924, Dr. Straton engaged in a series of debates with the Modernist minister Charles Francis Potter of the West Side Unitarian Church. Friendly enemies, Straton and Potter debated the following subjects: (1) "Resolved, that the Bible is the infallible word of God"; (2) "Resolved, that the world and man came by creation of a living God and not by evolution"; (3) "Resolved, that the miraculous virgin birth of Jesus Christ is an essential Christian doctrine"; (4) "Resolved, that Jesus Christ is the Divine Son of God"; and (5) "Resolved, that Jesus Christ will return in bodily presence to this earth and establish the reign of universal peace and righteousness." Later Straton published a book, The Famous New York Fundamentalist-Modernist Debates, which contained only his own speeches and omitted those of Potter.

On June 28, 1924, he offered the opening invocation on the fifth day of the 1924 Democratic National Convention.

During the Scopes Trial when the judge was considering letting scientists testify for the defense, William Jennings Bryan wired Straton to come to Dayton, Tennessee, to be a rebuttal witness. However, the judge ruled against the defense and Straton never went to Tennessee. After the trial and Bryan's death, Straton challenged defense attorneys Clarence Darrow and Dudley Field Malone to debate, but was rebuffed.

During the 1928 presidential campaign, Straton, along with William Bell Riley and J. Frank Norris, rallied opposition to Al Smith, the Roman Catholic nominee of the Democratic Party. In keeping with his strong opposition to the liquor traffic, Straton was one of the first to label Smith "the candidate of rum, Romanism and rebellion", a phrase used unsuccessfully in 1884 against Grover Cleveland in the race against James G. Blaine. Huey Pierce Long, Jr., the governor of Louisiana in 1928 and a Smith supporter, claimed that Straton was being paid $500 a night for speeches on behalf of the Republican candidate, Herbert Hoover. Long accused Straton of waging war against white supremacy in the American South. Long said that he respected all clergymen and denominations but not when "political considerations entered therein."

Straton's health was broken by his intense schedule during the campaign, and in April 1929 he suffered a slight paralytic stroke, which led to a nervous breakdown brought on by overwork in the fall and finally a fatal heart attack on October 29, 1929.

Straton married the former Georgia Hillyer of Atlanta, Georgia, on November 2, 1903, and they had four sons: Rev. Hillyer Hawthorne Straton, John Charles Straton, Rev. Warren Badenock Straton, and George Douglas Straton.
