= Virginia Film Office =

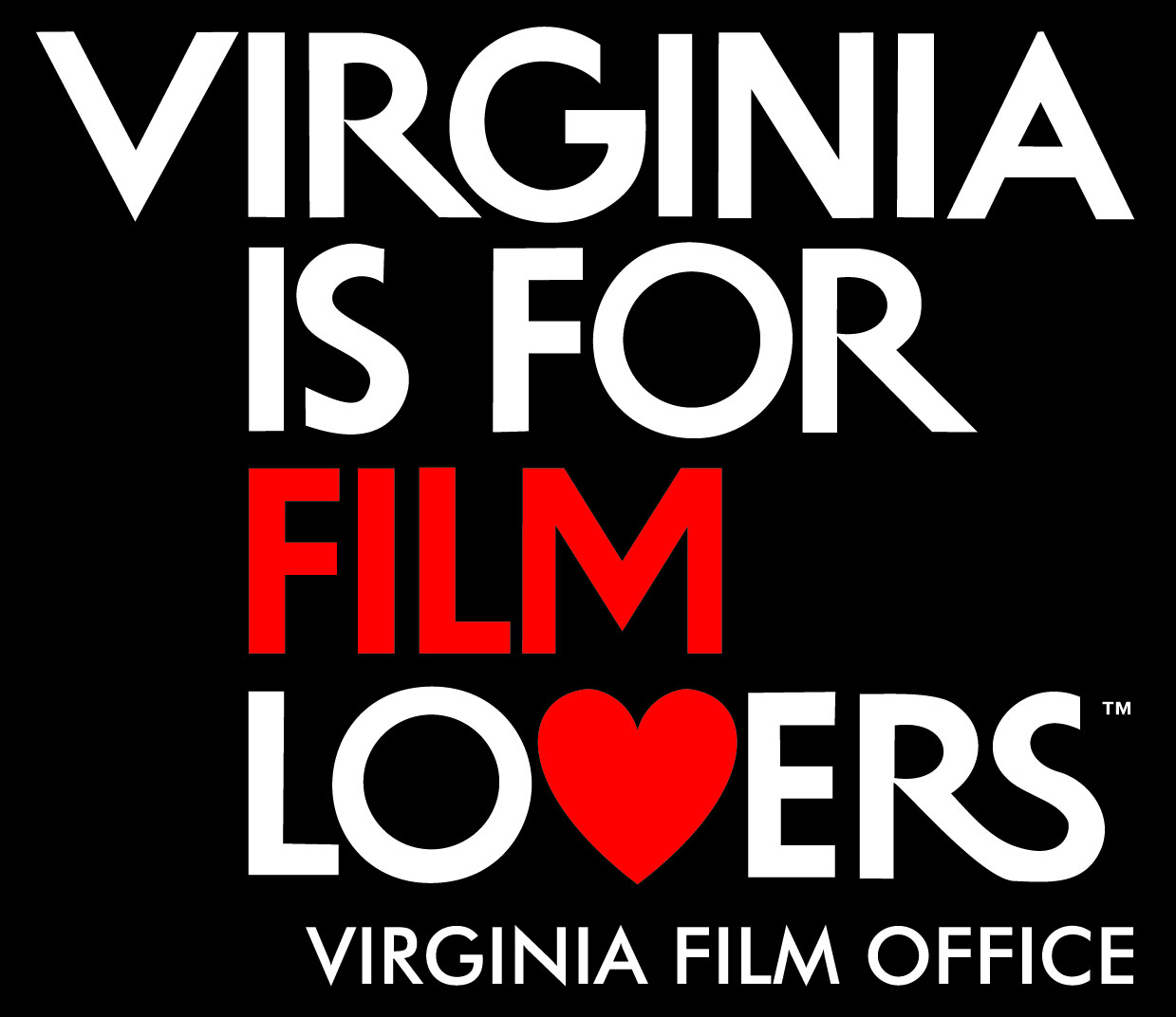
- Type: Government Agency
- Industry: Film
- Headquarters: Richmond, Virginia, United States
- Key people: Andy Edmunds, Director
- Number of employees: 4
- Website: www.film.virginia.org

The Virginia Film Office is a part of the Virginia Tourism Corporation located in Richmond, Virginia. The Virginia Film Office brings jobs and revenue to the Commonwealth by marketing the state as a location for film, television, and commercial production and by supporting and fostering Virginia's in-state production industry.

== About ==
The Virginia Film Office was founded in 1980 with the mission of increasing revenue to the state of Virginia through the production of filmed products, including television shows, feature films, short videos, documentaries, and commercials. The office is part of the Virginia Tourism Corporation and helps to supports its goal of "supporting, maintaining and expanding … the tourism and motion picture production industries in order to increase visitor expenditures, tax revenues and employment." "A recent study conducted by Mangum Economic Consulting found that, in 2019, the film industry's contribution to Virginia's economy was $862 million in total economic output, 5,629 full time equivalent jobs, and $34.2 million in state and local tax revenue".

The Virginia Film Office is committed to increasing film and video production within the Commonwealth through activities that attract out-of-state business and expand the existing in-state industry. In 2020, due to Virginia's diverse palette of film locations, supportive public institutions, and experienced Film Office staff, the state was ranked as one of the top ten best filming locations in the United States by MovieMaker Magazine.

The Film Office primarily promotes Virginia's exceptional locations for film and video production. Throughout the entire production process, staff members work closely with producers assisting mainly with local crew and location resources. In addition, the Film Office also provides a statewide network of film liaisons who help with more specified location concerns.

== Notable Virginia filmography ==
Due to Virginia's plethora of unique and diverse filming locations and film-friendly environment, the state has drawn an assortment of renowned filmmakers. Notable films and television shows produced in Virginia are listed below.

=== Alphabetically Listed ===
- A Haunting
- Argo
- Big Stone Gap
- Blue Ruin
- Box, The
- Captain Philips
- Coal Miner's Daughter
- Cold Mountain
- Coming Through the Rye
- Contact
- Contender, The
- Dirty Dancing
- Dopesick (miniseries)
- Evan Almighty
- Field of Lost Shoes
- Foxcatcher
- The Good Lord Bird
- Hannibal
- Harriet
- Imperium
- Jackal, The
- Jason Bourne
- Killing Lincoln
- HBO Miniseries John Adams
- Lake City
- Lassie
- Loving
- PBS series Mercy Street
- Mickey
- Minority Report
- Mission Impossible III
- National Treasure 2
- New World, The
- Raymond and Ray
- Steven Spielberg's Lincoln
- Swagger (TV series)
- Terrence Malick's The New World
- Transformers: Revenge of the Fallen
- True Colors
- The Walking Dead: World Beyond
- War of the Worlds, The
- AMC's Revolutionary War series Turn: Washington's Spies
- What About Bob?
- Wish You Well

== Incentives ==
The State of Virginia offers an incentive package that encourages filmmakers to choose the state of Virginia for their film, television, and new media productions. Virginia's incentive package is based on two different funds: the Governor's Motion Picture Opportunity Fund, which is a grant fund, and the Virginia Motion Picture Tax Credit fund, which is a refundable tax credit program. In addition to the incentive funds, the state also has a Sales and Use Tax Exemption that applies to the purchase of production related supplies and equipment. Finally, hotel stays of 30 days or more are also exempt from state sales tax and some local lodging taxes.

- The Governor's Motion Picture Opportunity Fund
- Virginia Motion Picture Production Tax Credit
- Sales and Use Tax Exemption
- Lodging Tax Exemptions

== Organization ==
The Virginia Film Office staffs four employees: Film Office Director Andy Edmunds, Assistant Director Dawn Blacksten Schick, Communications Manager Margaret Finucane, and Locations Manager Lori Russell.
