= Grammar School No. 35 =

Public school in New York City

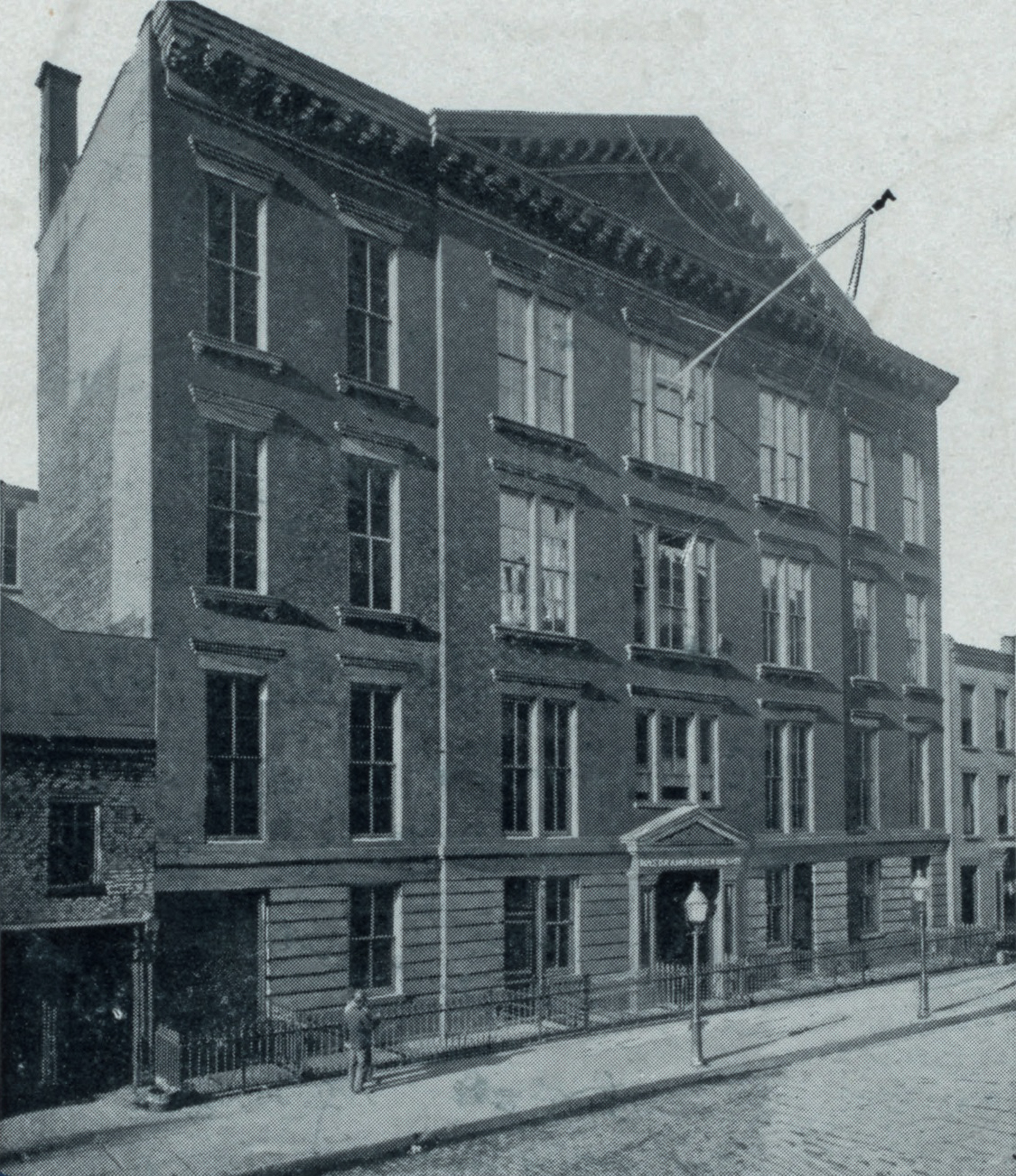

Location
- 60 W 13th Street; New York, New York; United States
- Coordinates: 40°44′11″N 73°59′49″W

Information
- Type: Public high school
- Established: 1847
- Campus type: Urban
- Communities served: New York City

Grammar School No. 35, also known as the "Thirteenth Street School" or "Ward School No. 35" was a public school on 60 West Thirteenth Street in Manhattan, New York City. It was known as one of the largest and most prestigious public schools for boys in New York City.

== History ==
Ward School No. 20 was built in 1847; in 1853, the ward schools in the city were renumbered, and the building became No. 35. The school had two departments: "Primary" and "Senior"; "Primary" was for boys only.

Thomas Hunter began teaching at the school around 1850, when he arrived in the United States. He was made vice principal within four years, and was the school's principal from 1857 to 1869. He increased the student population from 300 to 1,000 students, and innovated a ban on corporal punishment, an act that the Board of Education later instituted in all New York public schools. Hunter's success at the school impressed William Wood of New York's Board of Education, who helped Hunter found what would become Hunter College.

The school building, by Sixth Avenue in Manhattan, was a four-story brick building with about 30 classrooms, a playroom, and a basement, with a front and rear stairway as well as fire escapes. The building held about 1,000 students. Alterations and additions to the building were made in 1861.

From 1897 to 1905, DeWitt Clinton High School occupied the school building. This was later followed by Julia Richman High School, and Washington Irving High School occupied it around 1912.

== Notable alumni ==
Graduates of the school formed the Thomas Hunter Association, an alumni association.

- Frederick E. Crane, Chief Judge of the New York Court of Appeals
- Ashbel P. Fitch, U.S. Representative
- Andrew Freedman, businessman
- Charles Evans Hughes, Secretary of State and Chief Justice of the U.S. Supreme Court
- Robert Stuart MacArthur, Baptist preacher
- Charles Herbert Moore
- J. Van Vechten Olcott, U.S. Representative
- Charles Lane Poor, Astronomer
- James Fitzgerald, New York State Senator and Justice of the New York Supreme Court
- Charles L. Guy, New York State Senator and Justice of the New York Supreme Court
- Robert Anderson Van Wyck, Chief Justice of the City Court of New York, Mayor of New York City
