= John Woodson =

John Woodson (burgess) was an early colonist, landowner, planter, merchant, and politician in Goochland County, Virginia, the first of his family to serve in the Virginia General Assembly.

John Woodson may also refer to:

- John Woodson Jr. (1744-1821) was a Virginia planter and politician in Cartersville, Cumberland County, Virginia
- John C. Woodson (1823-1875) was a Virginia planter, Confederate officer and politician from Rockingham County, Virginia
