= Jacob N. Liggett =

American politician

Delegate to Virginia Constitutional Convention of 1868

Personal details
- Born: January 2, 1829 Harrisonburg, Virginia, U.S.
- Died: May 8, 1912 (aged 83) Harrisonburg, Virginia, U.S.
- Spouse(s): Evelyn Virginia Winfield (1830-1867); Isabelle Spence (1842-1915)
- Education: University of Virginia
- Occupation: Lawyer

Military service
- Allegiance: Confederate States of America
- Branch/service: cavalry
- Years of service: 1861-1865
- Rank: lieutenant
- Unit: 7th Virginia Cavalry

Jacob Nicholas Liggett (January 2, 1829 – May 8, 1912) was a Virginia lawyer, Confederate officer, farmer and politician from Virginia.

== Early and family life ==
Liggett was born on January 2, 1829, in Harrisonburg, Virginia to Samuel Liggett (1796-1876) and his wife Romanzy Liggett (1805-1855). He was named for his grandfather (1767-1857), who died in Cumberland County. Young Jacob attended private schools including Washington and Lee University in Harrisonburg and graduated in its class of 1849/50. He then studied law and graduated from the University of Virginia in 1852. His cousin Jacob Yost (Virginia politician) (1853–1933) (grandson of his grandfather's daughter Mary Miller Yost, who was taking care of Samuel Liggett in 1850) became a U.S. Congressman from Staunton, Virginia, also in the Shenandoah Valley.

Jacob N. Liggett married Evelyn Virginia Winfield (1830–1867), the daughter of Dr. Richard Winfield, in Rockingham County, Virginia. She died on May 22, 1867, aged 38, leaving him with four small children (of whom only Virginia P. Liggett Schuler (1855–1931) survived to adulthood). In 1884, the widower married Isabelle Spence (1842–1915), a doctor's daughter from Westmoreland County, who survived him. He was a Freemason and member of the Sons of Temperance.

== Career ==
The Virginia Capitol at Richmond VA where 19th century Conventions met

Liggett established his legal practice in Harrisonburg by 1854. In 1860, he was a presidential elector for the Democratic ticket headed by presidential candidate Stephen A. Douglas, who lost to Republican Abraham Lincoln. The federal census for that year showed Jacob N. Liggett as a farmer and lawyer who owned $11,000 of real estate and $5,000 of personal property (including slaves), and lived with his wife and young children as well as widowed father (who owned $5000 in real estate and $7000 in personal property) and nieces Alice and Louisa Winfield (each of whom owned $4000 in real estate and $3000 in personal property).

On June 26, 1861, Liggett joined Ashby's Cavalry as a private. He brought his own horse and volunteered to serve for the duration of the war. He was later promoted to lieutenant, and his family preserved a letter from Turner Ashby praising Liggett's courage.

In 1867, Rockingham County voters elected Liggett and fellow Conservative John C. Woodson to represent them in the Virginia Constitutional Convention of 1868. The Convention met briefly in December, 1867; Chairman John Curtiss Underwood assigned committees on December 12, then recessed for the holidays. After they returned in January, Liggett revealed that Underwood, although never seated in the U.S. Senate, had been improperly using the U.S. Senate frank on his mail since 1865.

On March 7, 1868, other delegates (voting 56 to 15, although the convention had opened with many more delegates) ejected Liggett for refusing to vote on a certain measure. Liggett had taken the same stance as delegate J. Henry Williams of Amherst County, Virginia the previous day. Both were among delegates opposing two provisions: one barred former Confederates such as himself from holding office, another required state officeholders to take a loyalty oath beyond that given by former Confederates upon their surrender and required by the 14th Amendment. The draft Constitution with both measures passed the convention on April 17, 1868, by a 51-to-26 vote. However, Major General John Schofield and the Committee of Nine lobbied newly elected President Ulysses S. Grant to allow Virginia voters to vote on the "obnoxious" anti-Confederate provisions separately. In July 1869, Virginia voters rejected the anti-Confederate provisions, although they overwhelmingly approved the new Constitution without them.

Liggett's ouster caused him little economic trouble, for in September, 1868, the Old Commonwealth published an article about recent improvements in Harrisonburg, including Liggett's new frame dwelling on North Main Street, which cost $3000.

== Death ==
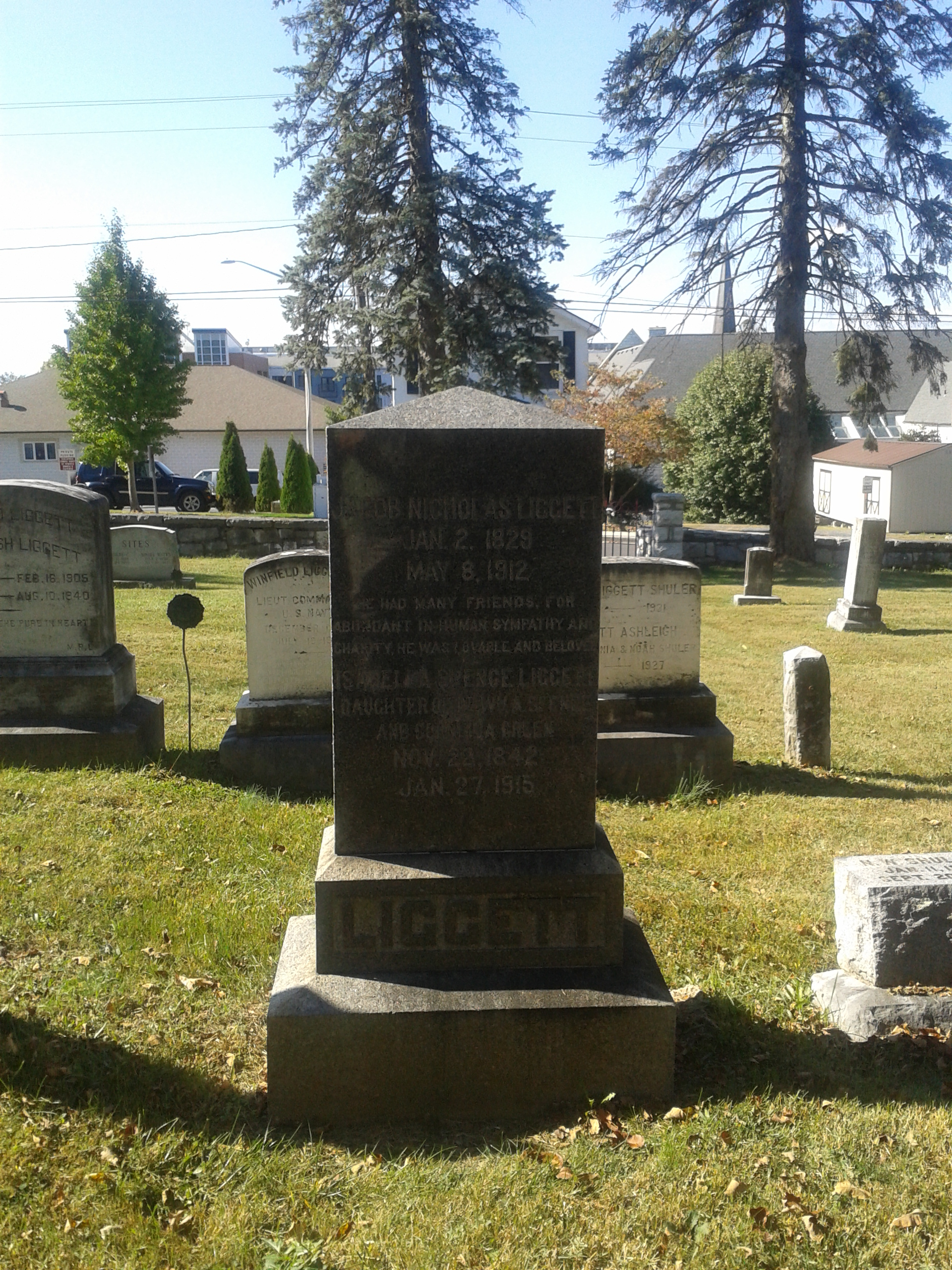
Liggett's grave at Woodbine Cemetery

Jacob N. Liggett died in Harrisonburg, Virginia on May 8, 1912, and was buried in the family plot in Woodbine Cemetery, with his mother, first wife, at least two children who died as infants and other family members.
