= William J. Dickenson =

American lawyer and politician (1827–1907)

Member of the Virginia House of Delegates from Russell County
- In office December 5, 1877 – December 2, 1883
- Preceded by: William J. Kindrick
- Succeeded by: George C. Gose
- In office December 4, 1865 – October 4, 1869
- Preceded by: position created
- Succeeded by: John H.A. Smith

Member of the Virginia House of Delegates from Russell, Wise and Buchanan Counties
- In office December 5, 1859 – April 4, 1861 Serving with Charles H. Gilmer
- Preceded by: position created
- Succeeded by: William J. Kindrick

Personal details
- Born: 3 December 1827 Russell County, Virginia
- Died: –5 April 1907
- Party: Whig; Re-Adjuster Party; Republican
- Relations: Henry Dickinson (grandfather)
- Parent(s): Major James Dickinson, Polly Gray
- Education: University of Virginia School of Law
- Occupation: lawyer, farmer, politician

William Jennings Dickenson (December 3, 1827 – April 5, 1907), for whom Virginia's last formed county, Dickenson County is named, was a Virginia lawyer, farmer and politician who represented his native southwest Virginia in the Virginia House of Delegates for several nonconsecutive terms before and after the American Civil War, initially as a Whig and later as a Readjuster.

== Early life and education ==
Born to the former Polly Gray, the second wife of James Dickenson (1790–1876), a farmer who represented Russell County for four nonconsecutive terms in the Virginia House of Delegates. His family included ten half-siblings (by his father's first wife) as well as a brother and sister. Ancestors had arrived in the area, known as Sandy Lick, before the American Revolutionary War. This man's grandfather, Henry Dickenson (also spelled "Dickinson") (1750–1825) served as a private in the 5th Virginia Regiment before moving to southwest Virginia and becoming the first clerk of Russell County. In addition to serving nonconsecutive terms in the Virginia House of Delegates Henry Dickinson married four times, and had many children, including by wife Agnes Jennings, whose surname is honored by this man's middle name. Two of his sons attained higher military rank, with Robert Dickenson (1795–1844) attaining the rank of Colonel and this man's father serving as major. The longest lived of the brood was Henry Dickenson Jr. (1787–1881), whose farm adjoined that of this man's father.

== Career ==
Dickenson read law with a local lawyer and practiced locally before entering the University of Virginia Law School. He became Russell County's Commonwealth attorney (prosecutor) in 1857.

In 1859, voters from Russell and nearby Wise and Buchanan counties elected this man (aligned with the Whig party) and Charles H. Gilmer, to replace Dale Carter as their representatives in the Virginia House of Delegates. Following John Brown's raid in October 1859, Dickenson (and his father) did not favor secession, but ultimately voted for resolutions decrying the use of federal force to coerce states into remaining in the Union, as well as approved Virginia's joining a confederacy of slaveholding states should efforts to resolve sectional differences fail. During the Virginia Secession Convention, voters had elected William B. Aston, who initially opposed secession but ultimately voted to secede. As the war progressed Wise and Buchanan Counties had no representatives in that body 1861–1863, and Russell County voters elected Isaac Vermillion, then in 1863 voters in all three counties elected William J. Kindrick and Thomas J. Smith. After Virginia conceded defeat, and while Confederates were not allowed to vote, Russell County voters again elected Dickenson to the legislature, and he served one term, December 4, 1865, thru April 29, 1867. Confederate veteran and county clerk George R. Cowan, whose family had lived in the area for nearly a century, represented Russell and Buchanan counties during the Virginia Constitutional Convention of 1869. After voters accepted the new state constitution abolishing slavery (but without the Confederate disenfranchisement provisions) and Virginia was readmitted to the Union, John H.A. Smith replaced Dickenson in the Virginia House of Delegates for the 1869 session.

After their father died, this man, who never married, lived with his brother Henry (III) and their sister Peggy and her children in a household headed by her merchant husband, Thomas C.M. Alderson.

In October 1876, Dale Carter initiated a lawsuit in Buchanan County to eject Jacob Blair, and many other men from lands on which they had been living for more than 30 years and believed they owned. The case was to be tried in Grundy, many miles away, and Carter had plenty of money to hire lawyers and witnesses while the men from Sand Lick had little if any cash, but determined to fight.

Dickenson also once again ran successfully for the Virginia House of Delegates in 1877, succeeding William J. Kindrick, and was re-elected twice. Dickenson aligned with the Re-Adjuster party, and served on the Committee on Courts of Justice, as well as those concerning Federal Relations, Banks, Currency and Commerce, and Counties, Cities and Towns. He introduced bills to improve roads in Russell and nearby Lee County, as well as to establish a turnpike company and consolidate railroad companies. Dickenson also learned that constituents wanted to form a separate county, finding it difficult to travel to any of the three courthouses serving nearby counties, particularly to contest foreclosures which were common in tough economic times. Thus, on January 12, 1880, Dickenson introduced a bill to create Dickenson County from parts of Buchanan, Russell, and Wise Counties. Although some wanted the county to be named after him, he declined until a senator introduced a bill naming the new county for CSA General Stonewall Jackson. Although Dickenson had not run for re-election in 1883, he represented Virginia as an alternate delegate from the Ninth Congressional District in the 1884 Republican National Convention in Chicago. Thus, the first delegate to represent the district of Buchanan, Wise and Dickenson Counties would be Jessee Childress in 1885.

== Death and legacy ==
William Jennings Dickenson died at his home on April 5, 1907, and was buried in the nearby Dickenson family cemetery.
