= Woodson (name) =

- Pronunciation: \wo(od)-son\

Origin
- Origin: Old English
- Meaning: "Wood's son"
- Region of origin: Anglo-Saxon

Woodson is a patronymic surname. It is also used, less commonly, as a given name. Notable people with the name include:

== Surname ==
- Abe Woodson (1934–2014), American football player
- Ali-Ollie Woodson (1951–2010), American musician
- André Woodson (born 1984), American quarterback
- Anthony Woodson (born 1988), Canadian football player
- Archelaus Marius Woodson (1854–1925), American judge
- Benjamin N. Woodson (1908–2001), American insurance CEO
- Bill Woodson (1917–2017), American voice artist
- Caleb Woodson (born 2004), American football player
- Carter G. Woodson (1875–1950), African-American historian, author, journalist
- Charles Woodson (born 1976) American football cornerback
- Chazz Woodson (born 1982), American Major League Lacrosse player
- Craig Woodson (born 2001), American football player
- Darren Woodson (born 1969), American, former NFL player
- David M. Woodson (1806–1877), American judge
- Dick Woodson (born 1945), American baseball player
- Harry Woodson (c. 1852–1887), American professional boxer
- Herbert Woodson (1925–2018), American engineer
- J. Belmont Woodson (1872–1963), American politician
- Jacqueline Woodson (born 1963), American author
- Jamie Woodson (born 1972), American politician from Tennessee
- John Woodson (burgess) (c. 1730–1789), American planter and legislator from Goochland County, Virginia
- John C. Woodson (1823–1875), American lawyer, Confederate officer and legislator from Rockingham County, Virginia
- John Woodson Jr. (1744–1821), American planter and politician from Cumberland County, Virginia
- Julie Woodson (born 1950), American model
- Lewis Woodson (1806–1878), American educator and minister
- Lloyd R. Woodson (born 1966), American public figure
- Marcus Woodson, American football coach
- Marie Woodson, American politician
- Mike Woodson (born 1958), American, former NBA player
- Randy Woodson (born 1957), American plant physiologist and university administrator
- Robert Everard Woodson (1904–1963), American botanist
- Robert Woodson (1937–2026), American community development leader
- Rod Woodson (born 1965), American football defensive back
- Ruby Garrard Woodson (1931–2008), American educator and cultural historian
- Samuel H. Woodson (1777–1827), American politician
- Samuel H. Woodson (1815–1881), American politician
- S. Howard Woodson (1916–1999), American pastor, civil rights leader and politician
- Sean Woodson (born 1992), American mixed martial artist
- Shirley Woodson (born 1936), American artist, educator, mentor, and art collector
- Silas Woodson (1819–1896), American, Governor of Missouri
- Stony Woodson (born 1985), American football player
- Tracy Woodson (born 1962), American, Major League Baseball player
- Warren B. Woodson (1903–1998), American college football coach
- Waverly B. Woodson Jr. (1922–2005), American soldier and health professional

== Given name ==
- James Woodson Bates (1788–1846), American lawyer, statesman
- Sarah Jane Woodson Early (1825–1907), American educator and author
- Woodson T. Slater, (1858–1928), American, Associate Justice of the Oregon Supreme Court
- Jesse Woodson James (1847–1882), American outlaw
