= Senator Moss (disambiguation) =

Frank Moss (1911–2003) was a U.S. Senator from Utah from 1959 to 1977. Senator Moss may also refer to:

- Frank Moss (Virginia politician) (1823–c. 1883–84), Virginia State Senate
- Lynda Moss (born 1950), Montana State Senate
- Ralph W. Moss (politician) (1862–1919), Indiana State Senate
- William P. Moss (1897–1985), Tennessee State Senate
