= Frank Moss (disambiguation) =

Frank Moss (1911–2003) was a U.S. Senator for Utah from 1959 to 1977.

Frank Moss may also refer to:

- Frank Moss (footballer, born 1895) (1895–1965), English football player, played for Aston Villa and England
- Frank Moss (footballer, born 1909) (1909–1970), English football player, played goalkeeper for Arsenal and England
- Frank Moss (footballer, born 1917) (1917–1997), English football player, played for Aston Villa
- Frank Moss (lawyer) (1860–1920), criminal lawyer and Assistant District Attorney for New York City
- Frank Moss (Virginia politician) (1823 – c. 1883), African-American farmer and politician in Virginia
- Frank Moss (technologist) (born 1949), former head of the MIT Media Lab
- Frank Moss (rugby union) (1860–1938), English rugby union footballer
- Frank A. Moss (1862–1940), mine manager in Western Australia
