= Charles T. Duncan =

American lawyer (1838–1915)

Personal details
- Born: July 9, 1838 Jonesville, Virginia, U.S.
- Died: September 29, 1915 (aged 77) Gate City, Virginia, U.S.
- Spouse(s): Mary Martin; Ella Holliday
- Profession: Politician, lawyer, judge

Military service
- Allegiance: Virginia; Confederate States of America
- Branch/service: Virginia Militia; Confederate States Army
- Rank: Lieutenant (CSA)
- Unit: 37th Virginia Infantry
- Battles/wars: Battle of Gaines' Mill; Battle of Spotsylvania Court House

Charles Taylor Duncan (July 9, 1838 – September 29, 1915) was an American nineteenth-century Virginia lawyer and state judge, who also served as a Confederate officer during the American Civil War, then after his release and pardon, as a delegate to the Virginia Constitutional Convention of 1868.

== Early and family life ==
Born on July 9, 1838, Charles Duncan was the first surviving son born to farmer John Henry Duncan (1812–1879) (who represented Scott County in the Virginia House of Delegates 1853–1854) and his first wife Elizabeth Carter. The family would include younger brother William and several half-sisters, who were born to Duncan's second wife Jane Pendleton. His grandfather was one of the first settlers at Moccasin Gap, and his great-grandmother sheltered at Fort Blackmore during Indian raids in the Revolutionary War era.

Charles Duncan married Mary Martin (1848–1885), daughter of Col. W. S. Martin on September 20, 1860, and they had a daughter Maggie in 1872. After her death, Duncan married Ella Holliday (1855–1930), and had two sons: Charles T. Duncan (1893– ) and Paul H. Duncan (1895– ).

== Confederate military officer ==
Shortly after Virginia seceded from the Union, on May 10, 1861, Charles Taylor Duncan enlisted as a private in the 37th Virginia Infantry at Estillville, Virginia. Lt.Col. Simms appointed him as the battalion's adjutant by March 1862. Duncan became a lieutenant on the staff of Colonel Samuel Vance Fulkerson (1822–1862), a VMI graduate and veteran of the Mexican war who had been a local lawyer and judge. At the Battle of Gaines' Mill on June 26, 1862, he was beside Colonel Fulkerson when he received his fatal wound. On May 12, 1864, Duncan was captured and imprisoned during the early stages of the Battle of Spotsylvania Court House. During his imprisonment, he read law. His brother William Robert Duncan (1839–1913) also enlisted and survived the war.

== Postwar career ==
Duncan listed himself as a merchant on the first postwar census. He was admitted to the Virginia bar and practiced law for four decades, first listing himself as a lawyer in the 1880 Census.

Voters from Lee, Scott and Wise Counties elected Duncan as one of two delegate from those counties to the Virginia Constitutional Convention of 1868, where he represented Conservative interests alongside Republican Andrew Melbourn. Duncan later won election (and re-election) as Commonwealth Attorney of Lee County, Virginia, and served in that position for eight years before becoming a noted criminal defense attorney in southwest Virginia. The Virginia General Assembly elected him a county court judge.

== Death ==
Duncan died in his sleep while visiting Gate City, Virginia on September 29, 1915, after giving an oration and unveiling a commemorative plaque on the centennial of the creation of Scott County's first courthouse.
