= Peter G. Morgan (politician) =

American politician (1817–1890)

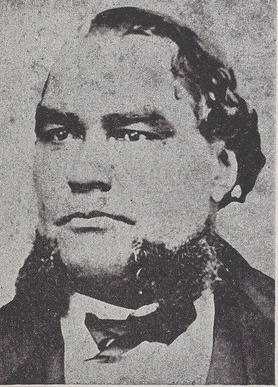

Member of the Virginia House of Delegates from the City of Petersburg district
- In office 1869–1871 Serving with George Fayerman

Personal details
- Born: October 21, 1817 Nottoway County, Virginia, U.S.
- Died: March 15, 1890 (aged 72) Lawrenceville, Virginia, U.S.
- Party: Republican
- Occupation: Shoemaker, Storekeeper

Peter G. Morgan (October 21, 1817 – March 15, 1890), born enslaved, after the American Civil War became an African-American politician from Virginia.

== Early life ==
Of mixed race, Morgan was born a slave in Nottoway County, Virginia, and learned to work with leather. A self-taught shoemaker and saddler, he was allowed to hire himself out. While still a farm hand and while teaching slaves to read was illegal in the commonwealth, he was known to attach a blue-backed speller to his plow and apply himself to lessons as he worked.

== Career ==
The Virginia Capitol at Richmond VA, where 19th century Conventions met

As an adult, Morgan made enough money by hiring himself out to purchase his own freedom. Under Virginia law, he subsequently obtained title to the members of his family, reportedly paying a thousand dollars to free his wife.

During the American Civil War, Morgan moved his family to Petersburg, and at its conclusion under the Alexandria Constitution of 1864, freed the members of his family who had legally been his slaves.

Morgan ran a saloon in Petersburg and soon became one of the leaders among its African-American community. He served on the school board, as well as the city council through the 1880s. In late 1868 he and others established the Petersburg Relief Association, which had separate black and white boards of directors. Since they believed whites received more assistance, on January 19, 1869, Morgan and others formed the Impartial Relief Association, with Morgan as president. He also helped found the People's Savings Bank in Petersburg, which failed in the 1870s, possibly because of the Panic of 1873.

In 1867, Petersburg's voters elected Morgan as one of their two representatives to the Virginia Constitutional Convention of 1868. Their other delegate was white Republican James H. Platt.

Following the Convention, Petersburg's voters elected Morgan to two terms in the Virginia House of Delegates, for 1869/70, and 1870/71.

Morgan was initially prosperous during the post war years, but he lost his savings in a failed bank. Nevertheless, he was able to leave his Petersburg house and lot bought in 1871 to his children.

== Death ==
Peter G. Morgan died in 1890 at Lawrenceville, Virginia, in the home of his daughter. She was the wife of the president of Saint Paul's College, affiliated with the Episcopal Church.

Morgan's descendants include civil rights leader, Ben Jealous, his great great great grandson.

== See also ==
- African American officeholders from the end of the Civil War until before 1900

== Bibliography ==
- Jackson, Luther Porter (1945). Negro Office-Holders in Virginia, 1865-1895. Guide Quality Press, Norfolk, Virginia. ISBN 9780598580269.
- Pulliam, David Loyd (1901). The Constitutional Conventions of Virginia from the foundation of the Commonwealth to the present time. John T. West, Richmond. ISBN 978-1-2879-2059-5.
- Swem, Earl Greg (1918). A Register of the General Assembly of Virginia, 1776-1918, and of the Constitutional Conventions. David Bottom, Superintendent of Public Printing. ISBN 978-1-3714-6242-0.
