= John Curtiss Underwood =

American judge (1809–1873)

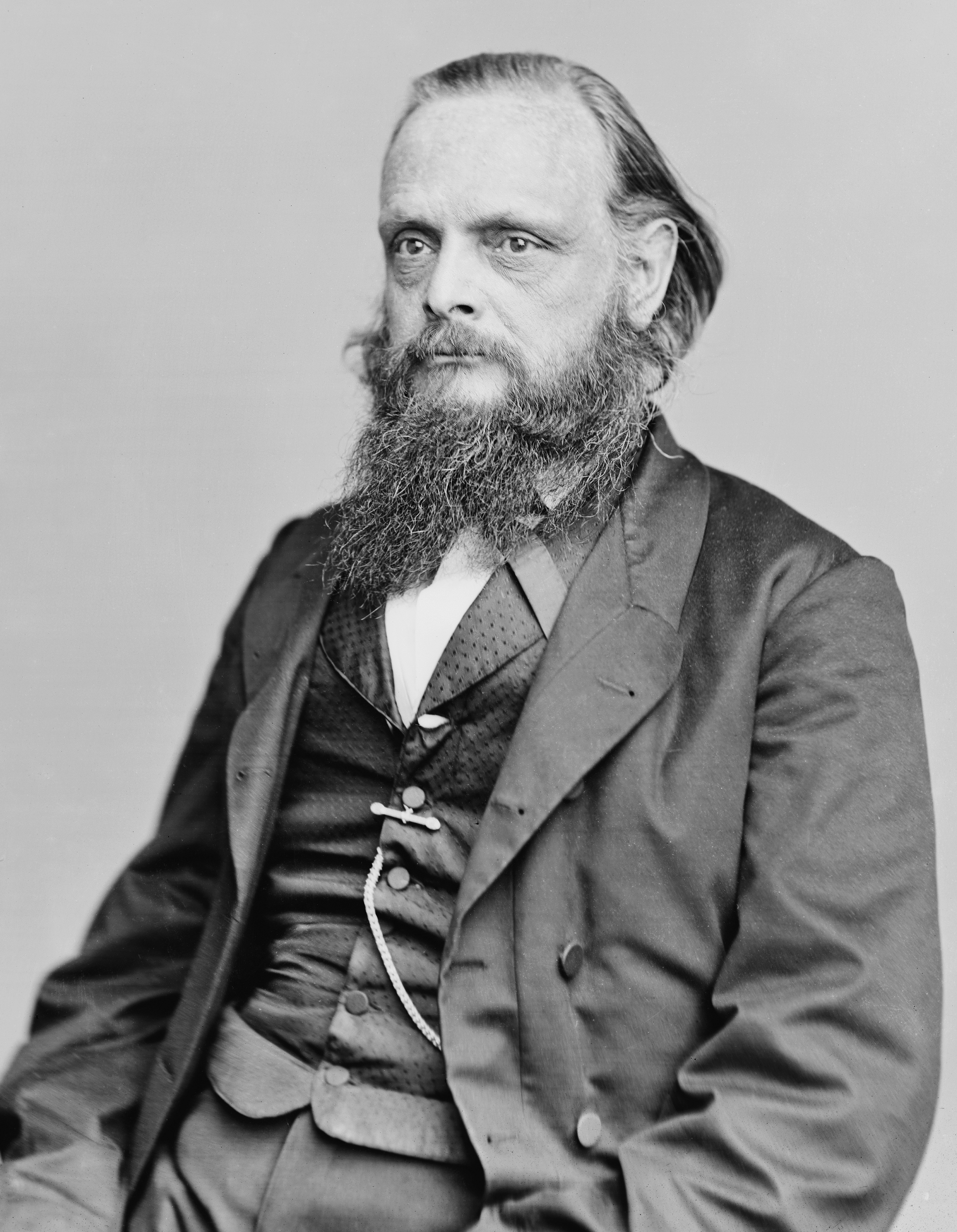
- Underwood as Judge of the United States District Court of Virginia in 1866.

Judge of the United States District Court for the Eastern District of Virginia
- In office February 3, 1871 – December 7, 1873
- Appointed by: operation of law
- Preceded by: Seat established by 16 Stat. 403
- Succeeded by: Robert William Hughes

Judge of the United States District Court for the District of Virginia
- In office June 11, 1864 – February 3, 1871
- Appointed by: operation of law
- Preceded by: Seat established by 13 Stat. 124
- Succeeded by: Seat abolished

Judge of the United States District Court for the Eastern District of Virginia
- In office March 27, 1863 – June 11, 1864
- Appointed by: Abraham Lincoln
- Preceded by: James Dandridge Halyburton
- Succeeded by: Seat abolished

Personal details
- Born: John Curtiss Underwood; March 14, 1809 Litchfield, New York, U.S.
- Died: December 7, 1873 (aged 64) Washington, D.C., U.S.
- Resting place: Congressional Cemetery; Washington, D.C.
- Party: Whig; Liberty; Free Soil; Republican (from 1854)
- Education: Hamilton College read law

John Curtiss Underwood (March 14, 1809 – December 7, 1873) was an attorney, abolitionist politician and a United States district judge of the United States District Court for the District of Virginia and the United States District Court for the Eastern District of Virginia.

== Early life ==
Born in Litchfield, New York, Underwood graduated from Hamilton College in 1832, and was a founding member of Alpha Delta Phi. After graduation, Underwood traveled to what was then western Virginia and tutored in Clarksburg. He then returned to New York to read law and began a private legal practice, which he continued in New York and Virginia from 1839 to 1856.

== Politics and abolition ==
Underwood had been a Whig, but as that party was disintegrating, he joined the Liberty Party in the 1840s because of his anti-slavery views. He unsuccessfully ran for United States Representative and then district attorney in 1847. He joined the Free Soil Party in 1848 and in the following year moved with his young family back to Virginia. Underwood hoped that successful operation of a dairy farm and cheesemaking factory in adjoining Clarke and Fauquier counties would show the superiority of using free, rather than slave, labor.

When the Republican Party was being formed, Underwood became one of its first supporters in Virginia, and in 1856 he traveled to the party's convention in Philadelphia, Pennsylvania, where John C. Fremont was nominated for United States President. Underwood's vigorous campaign for Fremont, the Republican Party, and abolitionism led to his receiving death threats, so in 1857 he temporarily left Virginia for New York and wrote of his persecution in an account published in The New York Times. In 1857, President James Buchanan named Underwood Chief Justice of the Nebraska Territory, but Underwood declined the appointment and did not appear in the courts there.

Underwood became Secretary of the Emigrant Aid and Homestead Society (which he incorporated with Massachusetts congressman Eli Thayer) from 1856 to 1861. He worked to encourage the migration of Republicans and European emigrants to the Ohio Valley counties of Virginia. These counties would become West Virginia when Virginia seceded from the Union in 1861. His efforts met with little success and then vanished completely in October 1859 in the aftermath of John Brown's raid on Harper's Ferry, when the Black Horse Cavalry searched and confiscated the Underwoods' Virginia property by order of Governor Henry A. Wise. Only Maria and the children lived there at the time; Underwood had been permitted to return only temporarily to settle his affairs after giving his pro-Fremont speech.

The Wheeling Daily Intelligencer, which Underwood supported financially, became the most influential Republican paper in any major slaveholding state. In 1860, Underwood was a delegate to the Republican Convention in Chicago, Illinois, that selected Abraham Lincoln as its candidate. He campaigned for Lincoln in border states, and on October 17, 1860, made possibly the only speech in favor of that Republican candidate in Virginia, in Bellton, (now West Virginia). The New York Tribune published that endorsement speech, which extolled the superiority of free over slave labor, about a week later.

== Proposed diplomatic post ==
In 1861, although the Senate approved Underwood's appointment to the position of United States Consul at Callao, Peru, Underwood declined the post, accepting instead the office of fifth auditor in the United States Department of the Treasury, a position in which he served from 1861 to 1864, under Treasury secretary Salmon P. Chase.

== Federal judicial service ==
Underwood received a recess appointment from President Abraham Lincoln on March 27, 1863, to a seat on the United States District Court for the Eastern District of Virginia vacated by Judge James Dandridge Halyburton. He was nominated to the same position by President Lincoln on January 5, 1864. He was confirmed by the United States Senate on January 25, 1864, and received his commission the same day. Underwood was reassigned by operation of law to the United States District Court for the District of Virginia on June 11, 1864, to a new seat authorized by 13 Stat. 124. Underwood was reassigned by operation of law to the United States District Court for the Eastern District of Virginia on February 3, 1871, to a new seat authorized by 16 Stat. 403. His service terminated on December 7, 1873, due to his death.

=== Judicial tenure ===
In this position, in May 1866, Underwood presided over the grand jury that indicted Confederate president Jefferson Davis for treason, and later denied him bail because he was in the custody of military authorities. Later, however, Underwood allowed Davis's Northern supporters to post a $100,000 (~$1.84 million in 2024) bond, and released him from custody in May 1867. Underwood also presided over a grand jury in Norfolk that indicted Confederate General Robert E. Lee on June 7, 1865, but General Ulysses Grant and other federal government officials ignored the indictment as contrary to the surrender terms at Appomattox Courthouse. Salmon P. Chase, who by that time had become Chief Justice of the United States Supreme Court, reportedly worried that after Underwood had testified before Congress (the Joint Committee on Reconstruction) about being able to pack a jury, he was incapable of conducting politically sensitive trials of the former Confederate leaders. Other government officials apparently concurred, and failed to press the prosecutions.

Early in the American Civil War, Underwood affirmed the right of the United States government to confiscate wartime enemy property under the Confiscation Act of 1862. His strong views on confiscation policy (what some called "retributive justice") put him at odds with the Supreme Court by 1869, and generated intense controversy in Virginia. Underwood's court confiscated more Confederate property than any other in the nation. Although Congress had stated its intention that confiscation only punish supporters of the rebellion and not their heirs, Underwood sought to eliminate the slaveholding class. In 1869, the United States Supreme Court ruled in Bigelow v. Forrest, rejecting Judge Underwood's interpretation that the law only required that the confiscation and sale be completed during the lifetime of the former rebel. In 1870, in McVeigh v. United States, the same Supreme Court held that the federal legal proceeding had to prove that the owner supported the rebellion (the judge's declaration that such occurred was not enough) and that the contesting property owner could appear through counsel and a writ, although physically behind rebel lines in Richmond at the time the confiscation began. Then the Virginia Court of Appeals in Underwood v. McVeigh, overturned the transaction in which Underwood's wife Maria, through attorney Samuel F. Beach, had bought McVeigh's property.

In 1865, Underwood was elected to replace retiring United States Senator John S. Carlile by the rump Virginia legislature in session at Alexandria, but was not admitted to his seat (nor was his colleague Joseph Segar), since many senators did not want to set a precedent for allowing premature reentry of Confederate states into the Union. Because Underwood had not resigned from the bench in contemplation of that service, his lifetime federal judicial tenure continued. The Virginia House of Delegates requested in February 1866 that Underwood relinquish that federal commission after his testimony against former Confederates before the federal Joint Committee on Reconstruction the previous month, but he refused.

Underwood continued his highly critical and public remarks against former Confederates and their sympathizers, who had regained power in the state, and in favor of African American suffrage. He published a letter that he wrote to Thomas Bayne, a prominent African American politician in Norfolk, in October 1865, in which he endorsed full African American citizenship and suffrage. The previous year, Underwood had criticized Virginia laws that prohibited African Americans from testifying in court. In December 1866, the Union League of Norfolk petitioned Congress to replace Virginia's military governor Francis H. Pierpont with Underwood.

In May 1867 Underwood was responsible for recruiting a jury of 12 African-American and 12 Anglo-American men in preparation for the abortive trial for treason of Jefferson Davis. Davis' best defense was that he had renounced his United States citizenship and thus could not commit treason against the United States. Trial for major crimes such as treason at the time required two judges, both the United States District Judge for the geographic area (Davis was held at Fort Monroe in Virginia) and the United States Supreme Court justice responsible for that circuit. Former abolitionist and United States Treasury secretary Salmon P. Chase had become Chief Justice of the United States Supreme Court in 1864, and thus responsible for the 4th Circuit, which included Virginia. In part because of his presidential ambitions (and movement toward the Democratic Party), Chase tried to avoid the trial, including by simply not showing up. When the Fourteenth Amendment to the United States Constitution passed in 1868, Chase invited Davis' lawyer to a private conference and explained his theory that Section 3 of the new Amendment prohibited further punishment of former Confederates. When Davis' lawyer repeated this in open court, Chase dismissed the case against Davis, over Underwood's objection, and the government chose not to appeal the dismissal to the United States Supreme Court. Davis thus became a free man.

== Virginia Constitutional Convention ==
Underwood served as one of five delegates from Henrico County (Richmond, although he did not live in either the city or county), at the Virginia Constitutional Convention of 1868, the first legislative body in the Commonwealth's history to include African-American delegates (20 served). Fellow delegates elected him their president and James W. Hunnicutt of Fredericksburg as chairman of the suffrage committee. Underwood dominated the convention, held December 3, 1867, through April 17, 1868. Some were uncomfortable with his conduct as de facto political boss of Virginia, especially his seeming sale of political offices in exchange for political contributions to the local Republican party. Furthermore, Underwood and later the convention proposed to give the right to vote to Black citizens as well as women, and he also advocated that schools be open to all regardless of color.

Many whites detested Negro suffrage, and in a three day meeting in December 1868 in Richmond, formed the Conservative Party of Virginia to oppose the new Constitution being drafted by the Underwood Convention. Alexander H.H. Stuart of Staunton became their leader, assisted by a nine-man central committee (all from Richmond) and a 35-member Executive Committee.

Nonetheless, the convention ultimately did its work and passed what became the first Virginia constitution to grant suffrage to all males older than 21. It also established (and funded) universal public education, and provided for judges to be elected by the General Assembly rather than directly by voters. Moreover, it reorganized Virginia's county government to resemble that of New England townships, with more elected officials and voting by ballot rather than voice.

However, the convention's proposed continuation of restrictions on voting rights of Confederate veterans proved extremely controversial, especially since Virginia's voters would elect a Governor, legislators and other state officials in 1869 if military rule ended. The radical Republicans selected former New Yorker Henry H. Wells as their gubernatorial candidate and the Conservatives nominated Robert E. Withers (both of whom later withdrew). Occupying General John M. Schofield cooperated with Stuart and William Mahone and issued an order delaying the constitution's ratification vote, fearing the effects of such white disenfranchisement. After a Committee of Nine (Virginia's Conservative political leaders), as well as Conservative Republicans Gilbert C. Walker of Norfolk and Franklin Stearns of Richmond negotiated with President Ulysses Grant and influential Congressmen, it was separately voted upon and excluded from the eventually adopted state constitution, which voters adopted by referendum on July 6, 1869, by a 210,585 to 9,136 margin.

This allowed Virginians to abandon the rump constitution of 1864, and elect a legislature including some African-American delegates by year's end. Ultimately, Conservative Gilbert C. Walker was elected to a full term, defeating, and Radical Republican Wells (who lost the popular vote). The provisional governor then resigned, allowing Walker's appointment as provisional governor until his elected term began. The constitution's passage also allowed Virginia to once again send congressmen and senators to serve on the federal level. This constitution (which remained in effect for three decades, until disenfranchisement of Black voters in 1902) is often referred to as the "Underwood Constitution."

At the Convention, Underwood was almost alone in promoting women's suffrage. On May 6, 1870, Underwood and his wife helped Anna Whitehead Bodeker organize the short-lived Virginia State Woman Suffrage Association. Maria Underwood received an invitation to the Seneca Falls organizing convention, which occurred only a few months after her husband's death.

== Final years ==
Underwood continued to promote rights of African Americans through his judicial office, but was overruled by the circuit court's chief justice Chase in Cesar Griffin's Case, in which he had freed a Black man who was sentenced for assault in Rockbridge County by a local judge who was a former delegate to the Confederate General Assembly. In Robert Stevens v. Richmond, Fredericksburg, and Potomac Railroad, Underwood told the jury that racial segregation on railroad cars was barbaric.

== Personal life ==
Underwood married Maria Gloria Jackson, one of his former pupils, on October 21, 1839, in Fauquier County, Virginia. She was a granddaughter of congressman Edward B. Jackson. They farmed in Herkimer County, New York, for about a decade. They had two daughters and a son, before moving to Clarke County, Virginia, near Maria's family. Around 1861, they moved to Alexandria, Virginia, and, then to Washington, D.C..

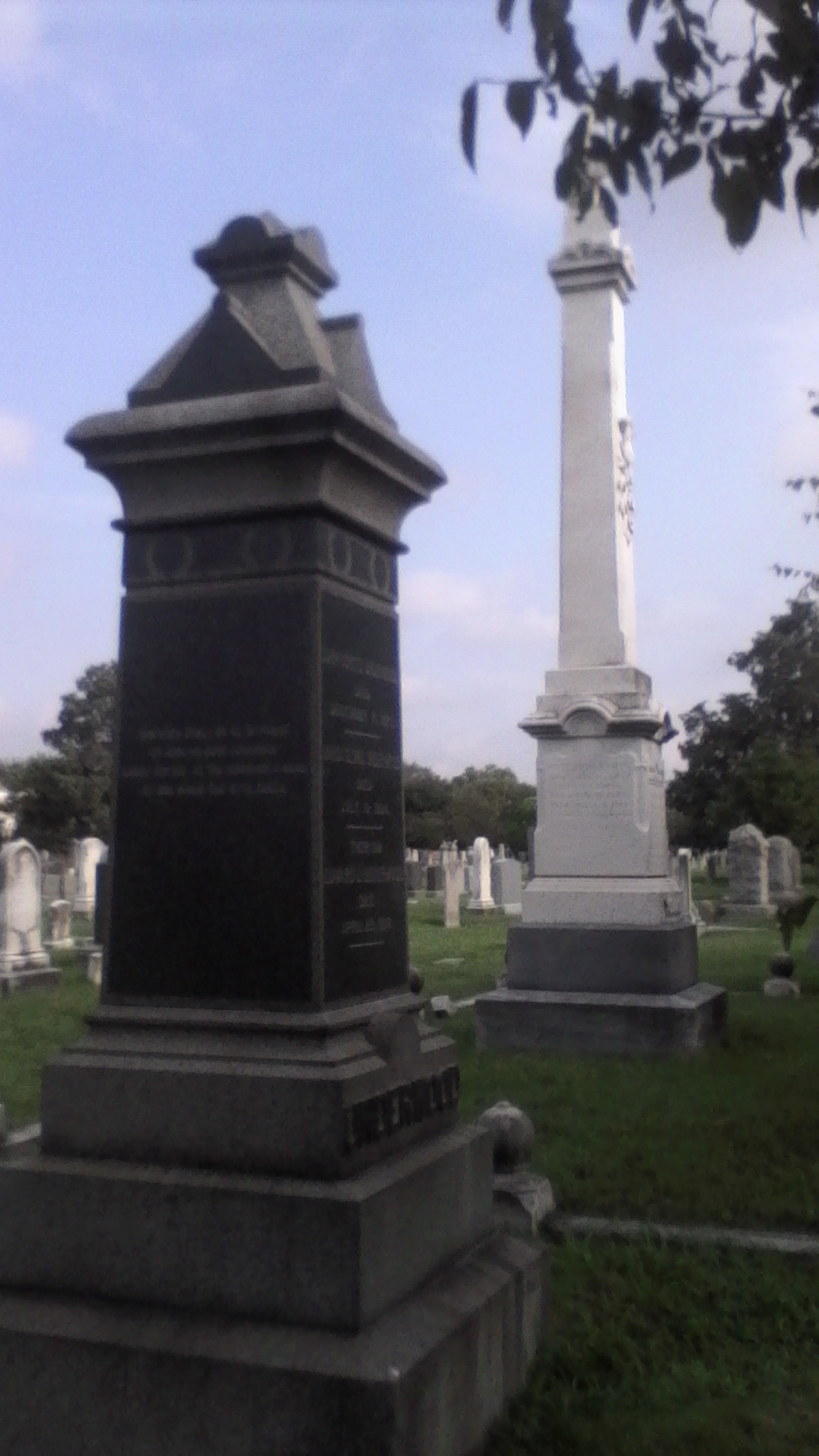
Underwood family gravesite

Underwood died a seizure in Washington, D.C. in 1873. Harriet Beecher Stowe wrote a eulogy of Underwood that was published in the Christian Union on January 7, 1874.

== Legacy ==
Many Virginia newspapers condemned Underwood and Readjuster leader William Mahone, making their names the most reviled in the state for decades. Despite his residence and business in Clarke County well before the Civil War, he was labelled a carpetbagger. Although he was a progressive judge for his era, much of his reforms were lost when President Grant nominated former Confederate Robert William Hughes as Underwood's successor on the bench.

The constitution that Underwood helped draft and felt was his legacy was amended in November 1872, removing its usery clause, and again in 1874, imposing capitation tax. In 1876, constitutional amendments changed office and electoral qualifications. In 1882, the capitation tax stricken. Finally, in 1894, there were changes to the criminal section.

The Library of Congress some of Underwood's papers in 1919.

== Sources ==
Legal offices
Preceded by James Dandridge Halyburton	Judge of the United States District Court for the Eastern District of Virginia; 1863–1864	Succeeded by Seat abolished
Preceded by Seat established by 13 Stat. 124	Judge of the United States District Court for the District of Virginia; 1864–1871	Succeeded by Seat abolished
Preceded by Seat established by 16 Stat. 403	Judge of the United States District Court for the Eastern District of Virginia; 1871–1873	Succeeded by Robert William Hughes
