= Woodson =

Woodson may refer to:

- Woodson (name)
- Wilbert Tucker Woodson High School, Fairfax County, Virginia, US
- Woodson Research Center, Houston, Texas, US
- Woodson, an EP by The Get Up Kids

== Places in the United States ==
- Woodson, Arkansas
- Woodson, Illinois
- Woodson, Oregon
- Woodson, Texas
- Woodson Bridge State Recreation Area, California
- Woodson County, Kansas
- Woodson Terrace, Missouri
