= Virginia Constitutional Convention of 1868 =

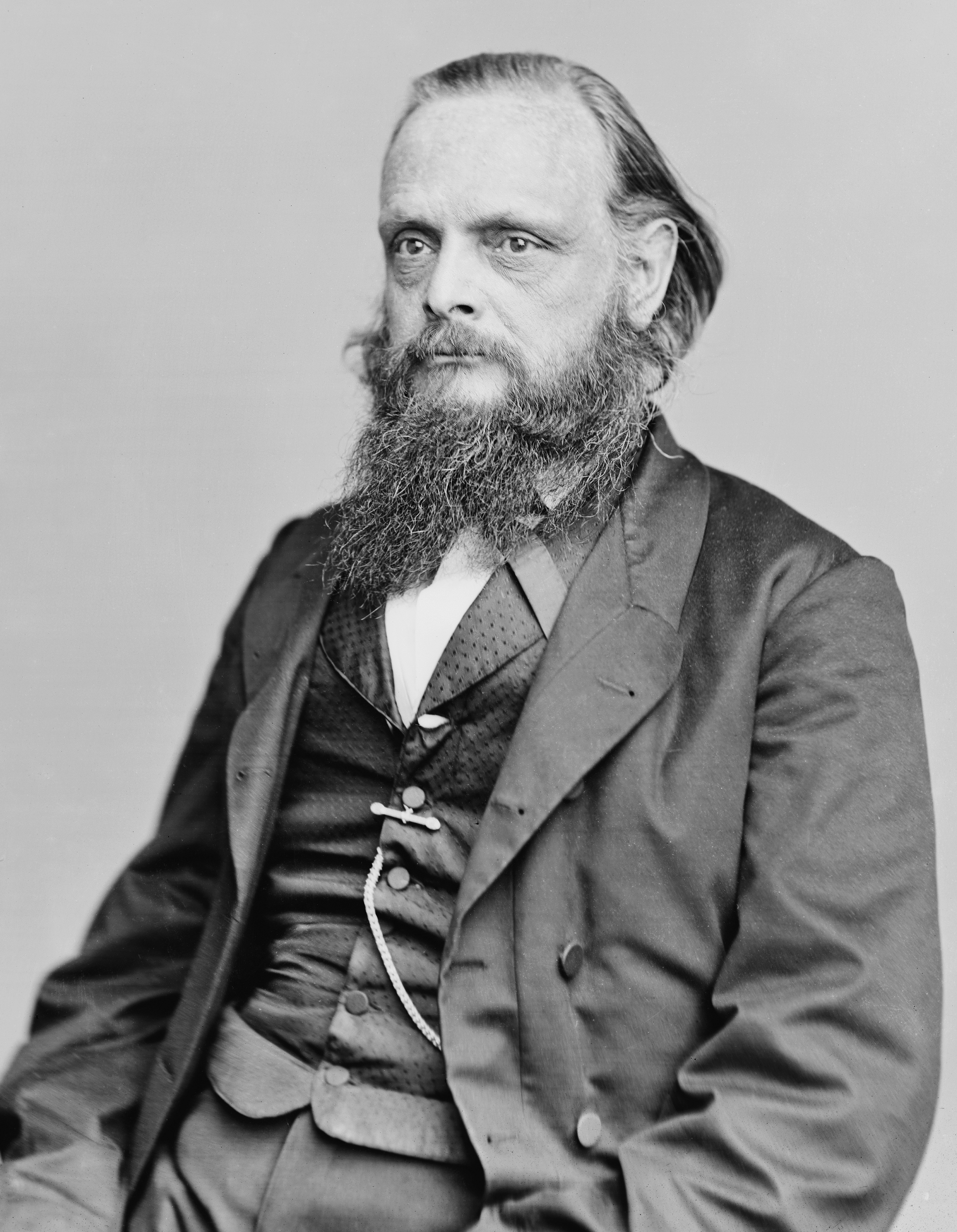
John Curtiss Underwood 1868 Presiding officer

The Virginia Constitutional Convention of 1868 was an assembly of delegates elected by the voters to establish the fundamental law of Virginia following the American Civil War and the Fourteenth Amendment to the US Constitution. The Convention, which met from December 3, 1867 until April 17, 1868, set the stage for enfranchising freedmen, Virginia's readmission to Congress and an end to Congressional Reconstruction.

== Background and composition ==
After 1866, according to the Radical Reconstruction Acts of Congress, a rebelling state which had vacated its delegation in the U.S. Congress was required to constitutionally incorporate the 14th Amendment before it was allowed to participate again. That Amendment guarantees that all persons born in the United States are citizens both of the United States and of their state. States were no longer allowed either to curtail the privileges of their citizens or to deny equal protection of their laws to any citizen. The Radical Congressional Reconstruction legislation required the suffrage for black men.

During Reconstruction, U.S. General John Schofield administered Virginia as Military District One. By the time he called a new state constitutional convention for 1868, three distinct parties had coalesced in Virginia. Radical Republicans included most ex-slave freedmen, and organized to advocate full political and social equality for blacks, but also wanted to exclude ex-Confederates from political participation either in government or at the ballot box. Moderate Unionists (including many pre-war Whigs), sought political equality for blacks, but believed that ex-Confederates had to be included in the political community because of the terms of surrender as well as majority among the white population. Conservatives wanted to ensure white control of the state (although crippled by former Confederates who urged a boycott of the nominating convention, and also opposed Radical influence on issues such as public education.

In the elections for the Constitutional Convention, Radical Republican superior organization gained a surprise triumph over both Moderates and Conservatives, resulting in a majority of Convention delegates. The statewide majority of white ex-Confederates immediately organized Virginia's Conservative Party by meeting and forming the Committee of Nine shortly after the convention began meeting in December 1867. They incorporated the moderate former Unionists to seek white-only control of the state.

The Convention's 104 delegates included 68 Republicans, among whom were 24 African Americans, 21 Virginia-born whites and 23 whites from out of state. The remaining 36 Conservatives were mostly wealthy ex-Confederates.

== Meeting and debate ==
The Convention met from December 3, 1867 - April 17, 1868, at Richmond in the Capitol Building (with a holiday break during most of December). By a vote of 63 to 36, delegates elected federal Judge John Curtiss Underwood its presiding officer. A Republican who had been living in Virginia since the 1840s, Underwood had become known for his speeches against slavery and later against Confederates, as well as for allowing expropriation of Confederate plantation lands (many later reversed on appeal) and initially refusing to grant Jefferson Davis bail when he was charged with treason after the war (the charges later quietly dropped). Delegates included enfranchised Unionists (many ex-Whigs) as well as freedmen and ex-Confederates, but was dominated by Radical Republicans.

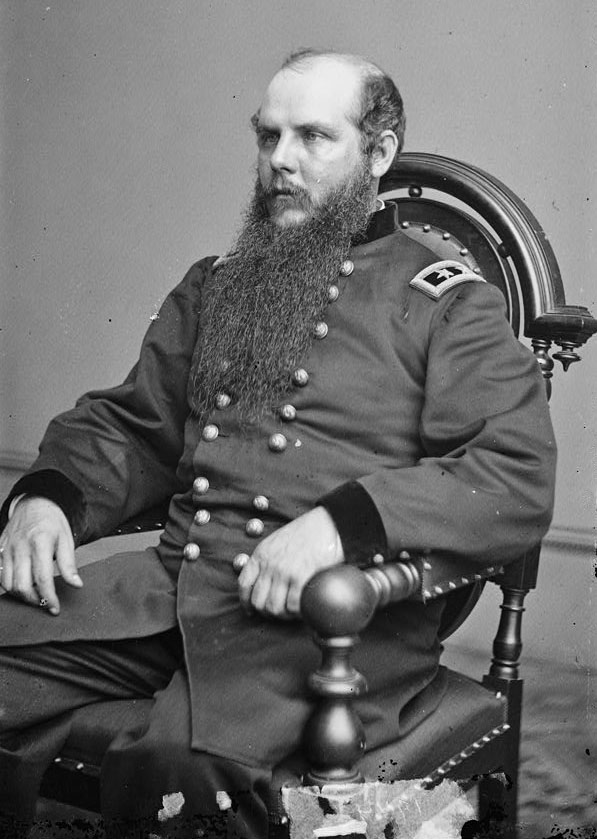
Gen. John M. Schofield
Commander, Military District One (Virginia)

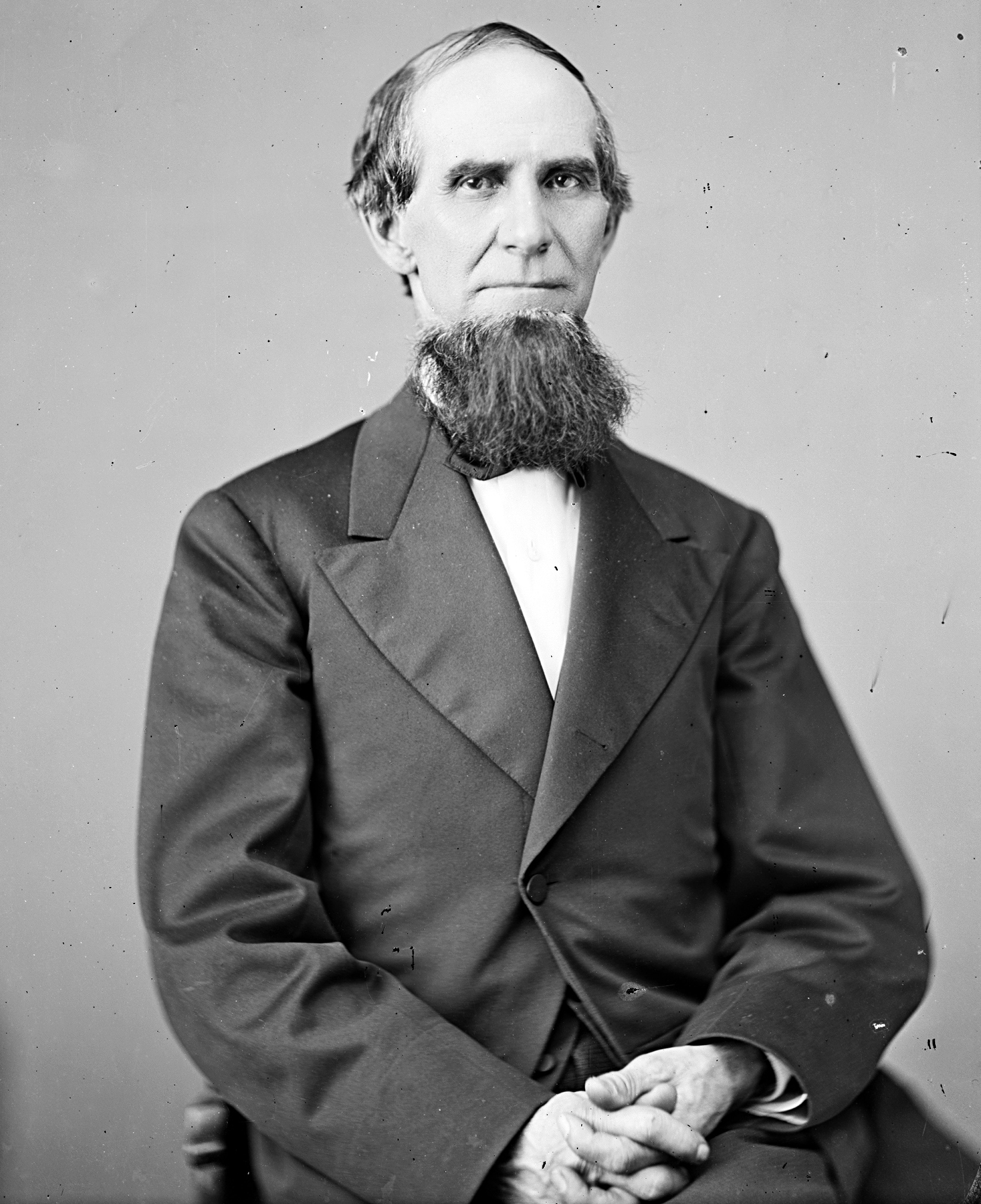
Christopher Y. Thomas
Republican delegate from Henry County

After the Convention resumed from a recess over the Christmas holidays, Radical delegates caused a stir by allowing Union General Benjamin F. Butler (whom many Confederates considered a "beast" for his actions during the military occupation of New Orleans) to speak on January 14.

Virginia's Constitution has begun with its Declaration of Rights since 1776. A radical proposed inclusive language to read, "All mankind, irrespective of race or color, are by nature equally free and independent and have certain inherent rights." But black floor leader Thomas Bayne of Norfolk had promised his voters that the Constitution would not have "the word black or the word white anywhere in it", that their children reading it in fifteen years would "not see slavery, even as a shadow, remaining in it…" and the measure was defeated by a coalition of black Republicans and Conservatives. Conservatives also objected to the Radical assertion that the right to vote was a natural right because they saw it as a social privilege meant to be restricted to the few. That provision was also defeated.

The Convention concerned itself with federal-state relations, with the Convention's Committee on the Preamble and Bill of Rights initially stating that "the General Government of the United States is paramount to that of an individual state, except as to rights guaranteed to each State by the Constitution of the United States." But ex-Confederate Jacob N. Liggett of Rockingham County voiced the ex-Confederate doctrine that "the Federal Government is the creature of the acts of the States." Christopher Y. Thomas of Henry County proposed a compromise, to simply assert Article VI. of the U.S. Constitution for Virginia's Bill of Rights, Section 2, that "the Constitution of the United States, and the laws of Congress passed in pursuance thereof, constitute the supreme law of the land, to which paramount allegiance and obedience are due from every citizen…"

That was not enough for the Radical majority, Linus M. Nickerson of Alexandria and Fairfax County who had served as chaplain of a New York infantry regiment, as well as taught under the Freedmen's Bureau, successfully added that, "this State shall ever remain a member of the United States of America…and that all attempts from whatever source, or upon whatever pretext, to dissolve said Union… are unauthorized, and ought to be resisted with the whole power of the State."

One of the Convention's two major innovations was providing for public education, which was common in New England which Thomas Jefferson had originally advocated but had been opposed by the planter class elite. However, the Radicals failed in their efforts to secure a Constitutional mandate for racial integration of the schools. Some delegates believed that allowing segregated schools would end the objections to public schooling which had been resisted in the General Assembly since Jefferson's proposals in the 1700s. However, like Bayne, but delegate Peter G. Morgan of Petersburg did not want any mention of race in the document, and succeeded. Black delegates at the Convention were divided nearly equally between supporting mandatory integration and leaving the issue for the General Assembly.

The Constitution's other innovation was allowing the governor to veto laws passed by the legislature. That proved problematic in the following decades, since the first legislature after adoption of the Constitution adopted measures reaffirming Virginia's prewar debt, at those interest rates (much higher than postwar) and other favorable terms. Moreover, Virginia was much poorer after the war, and tax revenues were insufficient to fund that debt. Legislation refinancing that debt would be vetoed by conservative governors several times in the next decade.

General Schofield addressed the Convention in April 1868, notifying members that by continuing to meet through March, they had exceeded their budget, and that he would not authorize expenditures after April 6. He also thought little of the Convention's Radicals, particularly two measures to disenfranchise the white ex-Confederate majority in the state, and urged members to rescind them before presenting their work to voters. The two "obnoxious clauses" as they became called, sought to guarantee only Union men would thenceforth hold office, and went beyond federal requirements (as well as the conditions of surrender at Appomattox Court House. One required an "iron-clad oath" testifying that a prospective officeholder had never "voluntarily borne arms against the United States" and another denied the vote to any person who had joined or aided the rebellion after having previously sworn an oath as a federal or state officeholder.

When delegate Hine had proposed denying former Confederates future governmental positions, J. Henry Williams of Amherst County strongly protested they exceeded the Convention's authority. Delegate Liggett followed up in a hostile tone on March 7, which caused his expulsion by a vote of 56 to 15. However, Hine's proposal initially failed on March 13 by an unrecorded vote, and on March 26 passed by a vote of 56 to 32. In the interim, Hine had secured approval of an alternate measure, requiring an additional "test oath" of future public office holders by a vote of 40 to 32. General Schofield believed those two measures too restrictive and addressed the convention on April 17, requesting their repeal, but instead the delegates voted to endorse the entire document as written by a vote of 51 to 26.

== Outcomes ==
Capitol at Richmond VA, where Convention of 1868 met

Following the Convention, in November 1868 former Union General Ulysses S. Grant was elected, though Virginia, Mississippi and Texas did not participate as "unreconstructed" states. General Schofield successfully negotiated with President Grant to propose the referendum on the Radical "Underwood" Constitution, but separating its two disenfranchisement "obnoxious clauses", allowing voters to decide on them apart from the Constitution. While the referendum on the main body of the Constitution was overwhelmingly approved, the two "obnoxious clauses" were defeated.

In the subsequent elections, the moderate Republican Gilbert Carlton Walker won the governorship. The General Assembly elections returned a two-thirds veto proof Conservative majority and twenty-nine black delegates and state senators. Both the 14th Amendment and the 15th Amendment enfranchising African Americans were ratified by the General Assembly, and on January 26, 1870, President Grant signed the legislation seating Virginia's delegation in Congress.

== Chart of delegates ==
The delegates to the Virginia Convention of 1867-1868 were elected on October 22, 1867 and are set out below. (One hundred and five members, from constitutional convention districts drawn by General Schofield)

Convention District	Name	Party; Further General Assembly (House or Senate) or U.S. Congress sessions, * = African-American
Accomac and Northampton	Edward K. Snead	Republican
Accomac and Northampton	James C. Toy	Republican H. 69/70, 70/71
Albemarle	Clifton L. Thompson	Republican H. 69/70
Albemarle	James T. S. Taylor	Republican *
Alexandria	John Hawxhurst	Republican
Alexandria and Fairfax	Linus M. Nickerson	Republican
Amherst, Buckingham, Nelson	J. Henry Williams	Conservative
Amelia	Samuel R. Seay	Conservative
Amherst	John W. Broadus	Conservative
Alleghany, Craig, Roanoke	Hugh H. Lee	Conservative
Augusta, Albemarle, Louisa	James C. Southall	Conservative
Augusta	Powell Harrison	Conservative
Augusta	Joseph A. Waddell	Conservative H. 65/66, 66/67, S.69/70, 70/71
Bedford	Gaston G. Curtiss	Republican
Bedford	David Staley	Republican
Botetourt	Lewis Linkenhoker	Conservative
Brunswick	William Leahy	Republican
Bath, Highland, Rockbridge	William McLaughlin	Conservative H. 69/70
Bath, Highland, Rockbridge	Joseph Mayse	Conservative
Bland and Tazewell	James M. French	Conservative S. 69/70, 70/71, 71/72, 72/73
Buckingham	Frank Moss	Republican * S. 69/70, 70/71; H. /74, 74/75
Campbell	Samuel F. Kelso	Republican *
Campbell	Samuel D. Williamson	Republican
Campbell and Pittsylvania	William H. Lydick	Republican
Caroline, King George, Spotsylvania	John Lawrence Marye, Jr.	Conservative H./63, 63/64, 64/65, Lieutenant Governor 1870-74
Caroline, King George, Spotsylvania	Frederick S. C. Hunter	Conservative H. 63/64, 64/65
Caroline, King George, Spotsylvania	John J. Gravatt	Conservative
Carroll, Floyd and Grayson	William R. Dickey	Republican
Carroll, Floyd and Grayson	F. A. Winston	Republican
Charles City and New Kent	Lemuel E. Babcock	Republican
Charlotte	Edward Nelson	Republican *
Charlotte and Halifax	Joseph R. Holmes	Republican *
Chesterfield and Powhatan	Samuel F. Maddox	Republican H. 69/70, 70/71; S. /74, 74/75, 75/76
Chesterfield and Powhatan	James B. Carter	Republican *
Chesterfield and Powhatan	Charles H. Porter	Republican
Clarke and Warren	Joseph McK. Kennerly	Conservative
Culpeper	Fayette Mauzy	Conservative
Cumberland	John Robinson	Republican * S. 69/70, 70/71, 71/72, 72/73
Elizabeth City and Warwick	David B. White	Republican H. 69/70, 70/71
Fairfax	Orrin E. Hine	Republican
Fluvanna	James D. Barrett	Republican *
Frederick	Norval Wilson	Conservative
Fauquier and Rappahannock	R. Taylor Scott	Conservative H. 81/82
Fauquier	Jonathan C. Gibson	Conservative H. 79/80, 83/84, 84/, 89/90, 91/92, 93/94, 48th Congress
Goochland	William S. Moseley	Republican * or Wm. P. Moseley
Greensville and Sussex	Peter K. Jones	Republican * H. 69/70, 70/71, 71/72, 72/73, /74, 74/75, 75/76, 76/77
Gloucester and Mathews	J. W. Dixon	Republican
Hanover	William R. James	Republican
Hanover and Henrico	Burwell Toler	Republican *
Halifax	David Canada	Republican *
Halifax	William L. Owen	Republican H. 65/66, 66/67
Henry	Christopher Y. Thomas	Republican S. 59/60, /61, 61/62, 62/63; H. 69/70, 70/71
Henrico	George W. Swan	Republican
Isle of Wight and Surry	William H. Andrews	Republican * H. 69/70, 70/71
James City and York	Daniel M. Norton	Republican * S. 71/72. 72/73, 77/78, 79/80, 81/82, 83/84, 84/, 85/86, /87
King and Queen and King William	Edmund W. Massey	Republican S. 69/70, 70/71, 71/72, 72/73, /74, 74/75
Lee, Scott and Wise	Andrew Melbourn	Republican
Lee, Scott and Wise	Charles T. Duncan	Conservative
Loudoun	Norborne Berkeley	Conservative
Loudoun	George E. Plaster	Conservative H. 81/82
Louisa	John B. Eastham	Republican
Lunenburg	Samuel Fuqua	Republican
Madison and Greene	Robert S. Beazley	Conservative S. 69/70, 70/71, 71/72, 72/73, /74, 74/75, 76/77
Mecklenburg	Sanford M. Dodge	Republican * H. 69/70, 70,71
Mecklenburg	John Watson	Republican * H. 69/70
Middlesex and Essex	William Breedlove	Republican *
Montgomery	Adam H. Flanagan	Republican
Nansemond	William J. Parr	Republican
Nottoway	William H. Robinson	Republican
Norfolk City	Henry M. Bowden	Republican H. 69/70, 70/71
Norfolk City	Thomas Bayne	Republican *
Norfolk County and Portsmouth	James H. Clements	Conservative
Norfolk County and Portsmouth	Luther Lee, Jr.	Conservative H. 69/70
Norfolk County and Portsmouth	George Teamoh	Republican * S. 69/70, 70/71
Nelson	Adolphus W. Harris	Republican
Northumberland, Lancaster, Richmond County, Westmoreland	Ephraim Nash	Republican
Northumberland, Lancaster, Richmond County, Westmoreland	Richard S. Ayer	Republican 41st Congress
Orange	Frederick W. Poor	Republican *
Page and Shenandoah	Moses Walton	Conservative H. 63/64, 64/65
Page and Shenandoah	George W. Rust	Conservative H. 63/64, 64/65
Patrick and Franklin	W. F. B. Taylor	Republican * H. 65/66, 66/67, 69/70, 70/71
Patrick and Franklin	M. F. Robertson	Republican
Petersburg	James H. Platt, Jr.	Republican 41st, 42nd, 43rd Congresses
Petersburg	Peter G. Morgan	Republican * H. 69/70, 70/71
Prince Edward and Appomattox	Edgar Allan	Republican S. /74, 74/75, 75/76, 76/77
Prince Edward and Appomattox	James W. D. Bland	Republican * S. 69/70
Prince George and Dinwiddie	David G. Carr	Republican S. 69/70, 70/71
Prince George and Dinwiddie	William Reed	Republican
Princess Anne	Willis A. Hodges	Republican *
Pittsylvania	Levi C. Thayer	Republican
Pittsylvania	Herbert A. Wicker	Republican
Pulaski and Giles	Eustace Gibson	Conservative
Richmond City	James W. Hunnicutt	Republican
Richmond City	James Morrissey	Republican
Richmond City Convention President	John Curtiss Underwood	Republican, U.S. District Judge, elected U.S. Senator to 39th Congress, but not seated
Richmond City	Lewis Lindsay (Lindsey)	Republican*
Richmond City	Joseph Cox	Republican *
Rockingham	John C. Woodson	Conservative H. 61/62, /63, 65/66, 66/67
Rockingham	Jacob N. Liggett	Conservative
Russell and Buchanan	George R. Cowan	Conservative
Smyth and Washington	J.H. Thompson	blank
Smyth and Washington	Joseph T. Campbell	blank
Southampton	John Brown (Virginian)	blank *
Stafford and Prince William	B.F. Lewis	blank
Wythe	James Gibbony	blank

== See also ==
- Virginia Conventions

== Bibliography ==
- Dabney, Virginius (1989). Virginia: the New Dominion, a history from 1607 to the present. University of Virginia Press. ISBN 9780813910154.
- Dinan, John (2014). The Virginia State Constitution: a reference guide. Oxford University Press. ISBN 9780199355747.
- Heinemann, Ronald L. (2008). Old Dominion, New Commonwealth: a history of Virginia, 1607-2007. University of Virginia Press. ISBN 978-0-8139-2769-5.
- Lowe, Richard G. (1991). Republicans and Reconstruction in Virginia, 1856-70. University of Virginia Press. ISBN 978-0-8139-1306-3.
- Pulliam, David Loyd (1901). The Constitutional Conventions of Virginia from the foundation of the Commonwealth to the present time. John T. West, Richmond. ISBN 978-1-2879-2059-5.
- Swem, Earl Greg (1918). A Register of the General Assembly of Virginia, 1776-1918, and of the Constitutional Conventions. David Bottom, Superintendent of Public Printing. ISBN 978-1-3714-6242-0.
- Wallenstein, Peter (2007). Cradle of America: a history of Virginia. University Press of Kansas. ISBN 978-0-7006-1994-8.
