= Orrin E. Hine =

American army officer and politician

- Born: June 22, 1823; Broome County, New York, US
- Died: September 12, 1899 (aged 76); Vienna, Virginia, US
- Occupation: Engineer
- Spouse: Alma Delano

Orrin Eugene Hine (June 28, 1836 – September 19, 1899) was an engineer and U.S. Army Officer who also served as a Republican delegate to the Virginia Constitutional Convention of 1868.

== Early and family life ==
Hine was born in rural Maine, New York, on June 28, 1836 to farmer Elisha S. Hine and his wife Nancy. The family included an older brother Lewis and sister Zelia, as well as a younger brother Henry. He would later marry Alma Hine and they had a son Charles in 1867 and daughter Katrina in 1869.

== Career ==
As the American Civil War started, Hine was forced to leave his teaching job in Bowling Green, Kentucky, because of his Unionist views.

On August 26, 1861, Hine enlisted in the 50th New York Engineers in Maine, New York, and soon received an officer's commission. He was later promoted to Captain, and received a brevet promotion to Major.

After discharge on March 6, 1865 at City Point, Virginia, Hine returned home to New York state, and that year's federal census showed him living with his parents and possibly a sister and her children later that year.

However, Hine returned to Virginia, settling in Fairfax County, Virginia, where he remained the rest of his life. Shortly after buying a farm and moving to Fairfax County, Hine donated several acres to nearby African Americans to build a Baptist church, which remains today. In 1867, Fairfax County voters elected Hine and fellow Union veteran Linus M. Nickerson, who both ran as Republicans to represent them at the Virginia Constitutional Convention of 1868. Hine defeated Mottram Dulany Ball, from an established local family and who had served in the 11th Virginia Cavalry, C.S.A., and who would serve a partial term in the Virginia General Assembly (in 1876-77) before accepting a position of customs collector in Alaska. Hine never again served at a state level, but did serve in various capacities in Fairfax County, including as sheriff (an elective office under the Constitution he helped write).

== Death and legacy ==
Hine died in Vienna, Virginia on September 19, 1899, and was buried at Arlington National Cemetery.

In 1908, his widow was granted a pension based on his service His son, Spanish–American War veteran, lawyer and railroadman Col. Charles DeLano Hine is buried near them both.
