= George R. Cowan =

American farmer, investor, and politician

Delegate to Virginia Constitutional Convention of 1868

Personal details
- Born: September 22, 1837 Lebanon, Virginia, US
- Died: October 14, 1904 (aged 67) Colorado Springs, Colorado, US
- Spouse: Sallie Fuller
- Occupation: farmer, real estate investor, politician

Military service
- Allegiance: Confederate States of America
- Branch/service: infantry
- Years of service: 1861–1863
- Unit: 37th Virginia Infantry
- Battles/wars: Battle of Cheat Mountain; Jackson's Valley Campaign; First Battle of Winchester; First Battle of Kernstown; Battle of Cedar Mountain

George Rutledge Cowan (September 22, 1837 – October 14, 1904) was a farmer, real estate investor, Confederate officer and politician from Russell County, Virginia.

== Early and family life ==
George Rutledge Cowan was born on September 22, 1837, in Lebanon, Virginia, to George R. Cowen Sr. and Mary née Gilmer Cowen. George Sr. had represented Russell County in the Virginia General Assembly intermittently since 1825, first as a delegate and beginning in 1831 as a state senator, and his family had settled in the area before the American Revolutionary War. By 1730, an ancestor had emigrated from northern Ireland to Pennsylvania, and his children would move to the Shenandoah Valley as well as North Carolina. By 1772, brothers Samuel, Andrew and William Cowan had settled near their brother David in the Clinch River Valley in what was then Washington County, Virginia, but which became Russell and Scott Counties near the Cumberland Gap and Wilderness Road. They settled with their families despite violent opposition of local native Americans (and the British between 1763 and the end of the American Revolutionary War). In 1776, Samuel Cowan was murdered during an Indian raid and his wife Anne Walker Cowan taken captive. In 1785 in nearby Blount County, Tennessee, Anne Cowan dramatically escaped Shawnee captors with the help of a French trader and turned herself in to Major William Russell (for whom the Virginia county was named when created in 1786), then left the frontier, instead settling in Rockingham County, Virginia. Andrew Cowan and Thomas Carter were the first two men elected to represent Russell county in the Virginia House of Delegates, and Andrew was Lt.Col. in the militia. Andrew Cowan and his brother-in-law Alexander donated land to establish the town of Lebanon in 1818.

The elder George Cowan had numerous children and farmed with the assistance of two male slaves in 1840, and a male boarder and those slaves as well as a 46 year old female slave and three enslaved children in 1850 and 1860.

After his Confederate service, George Cowan married Sarah E. (Sallie) Fuller (1847–1888), daughter of Abraham Fuller, in Russell County on June 12, 1866. They had five daughters, as well as two sons who reached adulthood: Charles, Joseph, Lucy, Mary, Ellen, Sarah Cowan Laban and Nancy.

== Confederate military service ==
George Cowan and four of his brothers (David, John, Robert and Thomas) enlisted in the Virginia militia in the "New Garden Fearnots" at New Garden in Russell County on May 2, 1861. In August, the elderly Capt. Simeon Hunt having resigned to lead the local militia, Robert E. Cowan was elected captain of what became Company I of the 37th Virginia Infantry in the Confederate States Army.

Within a month, the unit moved to what soon became West Virginia, serving under General Robert S. Garnett, who on July 13, 1861, became the first general officer killed in the American Civil War. Confederate forces had been routed at Phillipi in early June, then at Rich Mountain, before retreating to Monterey, Virginia, by July 20, 1861. The Fearnots also served in the failed Cheat Mountain campaign in September 1862 before being assigned to the command of General Stonewall Jackson.

Private George Cowan received a hip wound in March 1862 during the First Battle of Winchester, but continued fighting in Jackson's Valley Campaign. However, two of his brothers died of their wounds that year: Capt. Robert E. Cowen died on March 30, 1862, of wounds received at the Battle of Kernstown, and Private John T. Cowan died within a month of receiving a severe shoulder wound at the Battle of McDowell on May 8, 1862. Both, and the death of their brother Bolivar in Bath County, Virginia, that year, may have contributed to the discharge of Private David Cowan on June 8, 1862, and Private Thomas B. Cowan hiring a substitute by October 1, 1862. On August 9, 1863, George Cowan was severely wounded in the Battle of Cedar Mountain.

After his disability discharge, Cowan resumed working the family farms (Russell County being one of the Confederate granaries). Russell County justices selected him as the county clerk, in which position he served until the war's end. He also briefly served as tax assessor. Ironically, although he preserved the court records during the war, when many Virginia records were destroyed, many were destroyed in 1872 when the Russell County courthouse burned down.

== Postwar career ==
Shortly before Congressional Reconstruction began, Cowan received a presidential pardon, but his application failed to mention his Confederate military service. After the war, in addition to farming, Cowan also married and bought and sold real estate in Russell and surrounding counties.

In 1867 voters of Russell and neighboring Buchanan elected Cowan to represent them at the Virginia Constitutional Convention of 1868. The notes of General John Schofield, in command of Military District No. 1 (Virginia) during Congressional Reconstruction described Cowan as an unreconstructed Original Secessionist. Cowan participated in two committees but did not make any speeches during the Constitutional Convention, and voted with other Conservatives in failed efforts to investigate the Convention's president for misconduct, as well as against provisions which would have prohibited former Confederates from holding office, and also against integration of the public schools which this Constitution established for the first time in Virginia. Cowan also refused to vote at the Convention's end to approve the new Constitution, but instead was one of 29 signatories on a published address condemning it.

By 1888, Cowen owned and paid taxes on 968 acres of real estate and in 1891 bought another 105 acres.

After his wife's death and the Panic of 1893, Cowen sold all but 143 acres of land in Russell County and moved to Orlando, Logan County, Oklahoma, where he ranched with his sons Charles and Ira, and daughters Emily and Bettie.

By August 1903, Cowan moved to Colorado Springs, Colorado, where his youngest daughter had died, and arranged for her burial. He then lived with another daughter who taught school there.

== Death ==
George R. Cowan died of recurrent skin cancer in Colorado Springs, on October 14, 1904.
