= Peter K. Jones =

American politician (1834–1895)

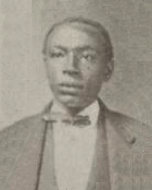

Member of the Virginia House of Delegates from Greensville County
- In office October 5, 1869 – December 5, 1877
- Preceded by: William H. E. Merritt
- Succeeded by: William A. Reese

Personal details
- Born: 1834 Petersburg, Virginia, U.S.
- Died: December 6, 1895 (aged 60–61) Washington, D.C., U.S.
- Party: Republican

Peter K. Jones (c. 1834 – December 6, 1895) was an American Republican politician who served as a member of the Virginia House of Delegates, representing Greensville County from 1869 to 1877. He was one of the first African-Americans to serve in Virginia's government.

== Early life ==
Jones was born free in Petersburg, Virginia in c. 1828 or c. 1834 to Moses and Lucintha Jones.

He married and maintained a home in Petersburg throughout his life. His first wife's name is not known, but he was a widower when he married Mary Ann E. Hope in Richmond on December 18, 1872.

== Career ==
In 1857, Jones bought property in Petersburg.

After the American Civil War, Jones bought a home in Greensville County, Virginia, so as to qualify for entering elective politics in the "black belt" Southside county.

In 1867, Jones was elected to the Virginia Constitutional Convention of 1868. A Republican, he was the sole delegate elected from the convention district made up of Greensville and Sussex Counties. The 1870 federal census showed him as a 33 year old black male carpenter living with Andrew J. Price and his family in Hicksford, Greensville County, Virginia.

Greensville County voters elected Jones to the Virginia House of Delegates for the session of 1869-1871, and re-elected him for the sessions 1871-1873, 1874–75, and 1875-1877.

In 1871 and 1872, Jones bought additional lots in Richmond, paying $432.

== Later Years and Death ==
Jones moved to Washington, D.C., by 1881, when he was employed as a watchman at the federal pension office. He continued his advocacy of African-American rights and remained involved with the Republican Party. He belonged to the Virginia Republican League and was its second vice president in 1888–1889, first vice president in 1889–1890, and recording secretary in 1890–1891.

Jones died on December 6, 1895, and was buried at Payne's Cemetery, in Washington, D.C., but was reinterred at National Harmony Memorial Park, in Hyattsville, Maryland, when the cemetery was moved in 1969.

== See also ==
- African American officeholders from the end of the Civil War until before 1900

== Bibliography ==
- Jackson, Luther Porter (1945). Negro Office-Holders in Virginia, 1865-1895. Guide Quality Press, Norfolk, Virginia. ISBN 9780598580269.
- Pulliam, David Loyd (1901). The Constitutional Conventions of Virginia from the foundation of the Commonwealth to the present time. John T. West, Richmond. ISBN 978-1-2879-2059-5.
- Swem, Earl Greg (1918). A Register of the General Assembly of Virginia, 1776-1918, and of the Constitutional Conventions. David Bottom, Superintendent of Public Printing. ISBN 978-1-3714-6242-0.
- Jones, Brittany L. and the Dictionary of Virginia Biography. "Peter K. Jones (ca. 1834–1895)." Encyclopedia Virginia. Virginia Foundation for the Humanities, 19 Apr. 2018. Web. 21 Sept. 2018.

Virginia House of Delegates
Preceded by William H. E. Merritt	Virginia Delegate for Greensville County; 1869–1877	Succeeded by William A. Reese
