= Burwell Toler =

American politician

- Born: circa 1822
- Died: July 21, 1880; Hanover County, Virginia
- Occupations: carpenter, politician, preacher
- Known for: Reconstruction in Virginia
- Political party: Republican
- Spouse: Sallie
- Children: 1 daughter, 5 sons

Burwell Toler (circa 1822 – July 21, 1880) (also known as "Burrell Toler") was an African American carpenter, minister and Republican politician.

Probably born into slavery in Hanover County, Virginia, Toler became a carpenter and preacher before the American Civil War. The Colored Baptist Shiloh Association ordained him a minister on August 13, 1865, and the following month Rev. Toler received his first authorization to perform marriages, from Henrico County. The Freedmen's Bureau considered him a leader acting on behalf of the African American community during Congressional Reconstruction, noting that he had the respect and confidence of all classes of citizens. He was the first minister at Shiloh Baptist Church in Ashland, the Hanover County seat, as well as at Abner Baptist Church and Jerusalem Baptist Church, also in Hanover County. Rev. Toler also founded churches in nearby Caroline, Goochland and King George counties. In 1879 until his death, he was the moderator for the Mattaponi Baptist Association.

Toler became active in Republican Party politics, and in April 1867 represented Hanover County at a Republican convention held at the First African Baptist Church in Richmond. The following year, 1868, voters in Hanover and Henrico counties elected Toler as their at-large delegate to the Virginia Constitutional Convention of 1868 over Josiah B. Crenshaw, a Quaker who the following year would become a member of the Virginia House of Delegates from the city of Richmond and Henrico County. Although disparaged by Conservatives and (at least informally by Major General John Schofield) as illiterate and Radical, Rev. Toler was active in that convention, both in committees and delivering two speeches from the floor. He voted to approve the drafted constitution as well as a provision opposed by Gen. Schofield and later rejected by voters which would have disenfranchised former Confederates. In 1869, he lost his bid to represent Hanover County in the Virginia House of Delegates. He remained politically active, but was never again elected to public office.

In 1870, Rev. Toler told the federal census taker that he owned property worth about $200 in Hanover County, and on January 1, 1871, bought 25 acres of land near Ashland that he still owned at the time of his death.

Rev. Toler died on July 21, 1880, in Hanover County, and is likely buried at the Shiloh Baptist Church cemetery, as is at least his youngest son, Joseph Toler (1876-1914).
