= James Dandridge Halyburton =

American judge

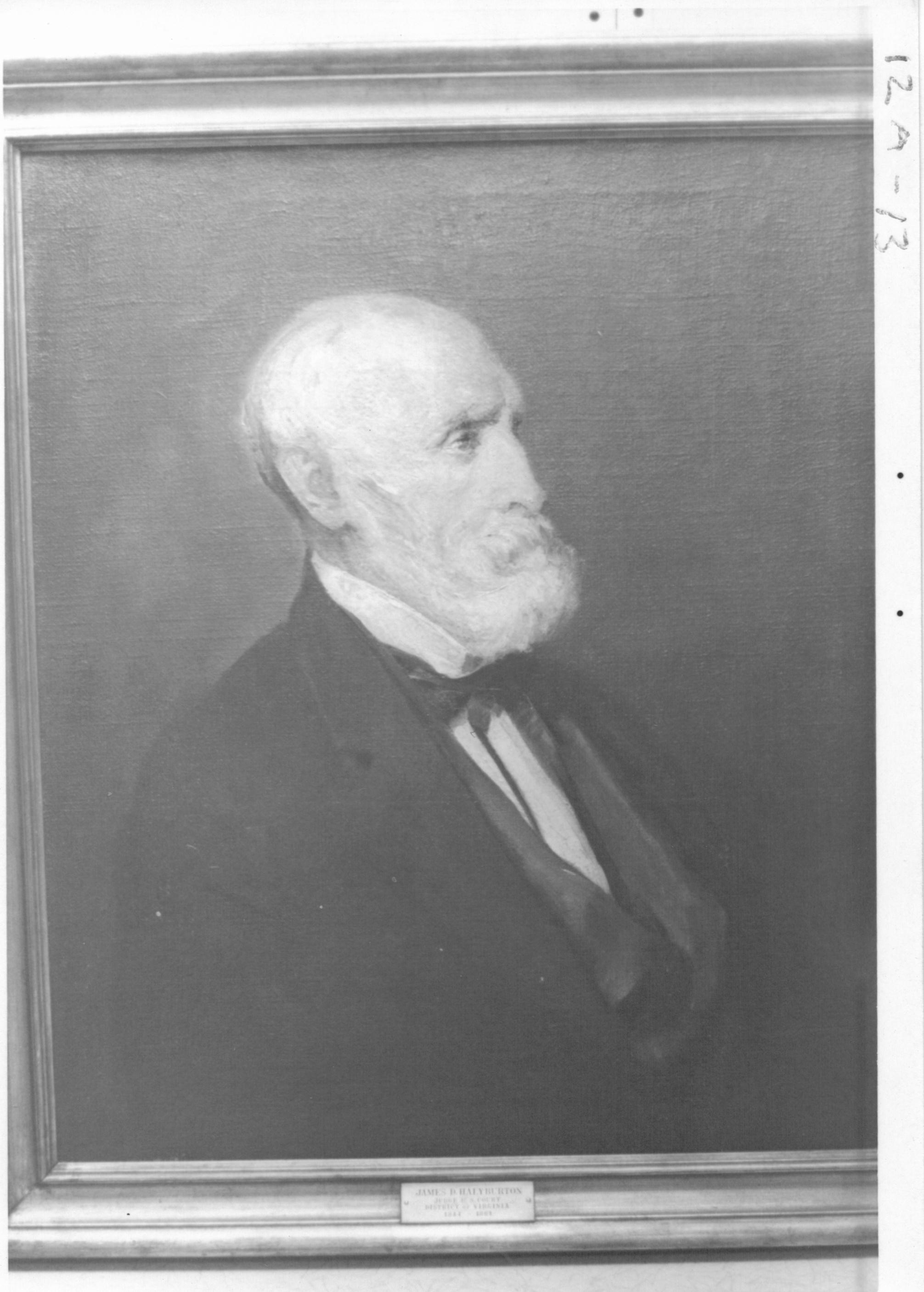

Judge of the United States District Court for the Eastern District of Virginia
- In office June 15, 1844 – April 24, 1861
- Appointed by: John Tyler
- Preceded by: John Y. Mason
- Succeeded by: John Curtiss Underwood

Personal details
- Born: James Dandridge Halyburton; February 23, 1803 New Kent County, Virginia, U.S.
- Died: January 26, 1879 (aged 75) Richmond, Virginia, U.S.
- Resting place: Hollywood Cemetery
- Education: Harvard University (A.B.); University of Virginia School of Law
- Occupation: Politician; judge

James Dandridge Halyburton (February 23, 1803 – January 26, 1879) was a United States district judge of the United States District Court for the Eastern District of Virginia.

== Education and career ==
Born on February 23, 1803, in New Kent County, Virginia, Halyburton received an Artium Baccalaureus degree in 1823 from Harvard University and attended the University of Virginia School of Law. He entered private practice in New Kent County starting in 1824. He was a member of the Virginia House of Delegates. He was a commonwealth's attorney for New Kent County until 1844.

== Federal judicial service ==
Halyburton was nominated by President John Tyler on June 15, 1844, to a seat on the United States District Court for the Eastern District of Virginia vacated by Judge John Y. Mason. He was confirmed by the United States Senate on June 15, 1844, and received his commission the same day. His service terminated on April 24, 1861, due to his resignation.

== Later career and death ==
Following his resignation from the federal bench, Halyburton served as a Judge of the Confederate District Court for the Eastern District of Virginia from 1861 to 1865. He resumed private practice in Richmond, Virginia from 1865 to 1874. He was a professor of law at the University of Richmond from 1867 to 1874. He died on January 26, 1879, in Richmond. He was buried in Hollywood Cemetery.

== Sources ==
- W. H. Bryson, comp., Legal Education in Virginia (1982), pp. 273–276.

Legal offices
Preceded by John Y. Mason	Judge of the United States District Court for the Eastern District of Virginia; 1844–1861	Succeeded by John Curtiss Underwood
