= Thomas Bayne (Sam Nixon) =

American politician

- Born: Sam Nixon circa 1820 or 1824-1825; North Carolina, US
- Died: July 5, 1888; Petersburg, Virginia, US
- Occupations: dentist, preacher
- Known for: Underground Railroad
- Political party: Republican
- Spouse: Edna
- Children: daughter

Thomas Bayne (c. 1824 – July 5, 1888) (also known as "Sam Nixon") was an African American Republican politician. Born a slave, he became a dental assistant and Underground Railroad conductor in Norfolk, Virginia, before escaping to New Bedford, Massachusetts, where he changed his name to Thomas Bayne.

Returning to Norfolk after the American Civil War, Bayne worked as a dentist and also preached; he became a leader in the African American community. He was elected a delegate to the Virginia Constitutional Convention of 1868 as a Republican, but was never again elected to another office.

== Early and family life ==
Bayne said he was born enslaved in North Carolina as Samuel Nixon. He escaped in 1844 but was recaptured after a year, then sold to Charles F. Martin, a dentist in Norfolk, Virginia. Dr Martin appreciated his intelligence and trained him as his assistant, eventually allowing him to keep the practice's books as well as make house calls to clients.

Nixon married a woman named Edna in Norfolk, who gave birth to a daughter. Using his freedom to move around the port city, Nixon became a conductor on the Underground Railroad. Eventually, after serving the dentist for about ten years, Nixon became fearful that he would be caught. He took passage on a northbound ship, leaving his wife and child behind.

== Escape and Massachusetts ==
Nixon disembarked at Salem, New Jersey, a rural port town across the Delaware River near Philadelphia, Pennsylvania. He received shelter from Quaker conductor Abigail Goodwin, who wrote to her Philadelphia contacts that Nixon was bright but also a braggart. While she suspected he might be a spy rather than a legitimate escapee, she nonetheless outfitted him and notified Benjamin Lundy and her other Philadelphia contacts, whom Nixon soon contacted and who sent him further north.

Although advised to travel to Canada, Nixon determined to settle in New Bedford, Massachusetts, where he arrived by 1856. There, he changed his name to Thomas Bayne and soon had a thriving dental practice in the Northern port city. In 1860, Bayne was elected to New Bedford's city council, with the support of local Republicans and temperance advocates.

== Postwar years in Virginia ==
By May, 1865, Bayne had returned to Norfolk and located his daughter, whom he sent to Massachusetts. The following month, he made a speech extolling equal suffrage in Norfolk. However, unlike Frederick Douglass, Bayne opposed women's suffrage, preaching that women's basic right is to raise and bear children.

In January 1866, Bayne attended the Colored National Convention in Washington, D.C., serving as vice president of the convention which lobbied Congress not to readmit the former Confederate states before assuring that the rights of African Americans would be honored. On February 3, 1866, Bayne testified before a subcommittee of the Congressional Joint Committee on Reconstruction about the harsh conditions in postwar Virginia. The Radical Republicans in Congress soon imposed Congressional Reconstruction, including military rule, on Virginia.

On January 7, 1867, President Andrew Johnson vetoed the District of Columbia Negro suffrage bill, prompting Radical Republicans including James M. Ashley of Ohio to begin impeachment investigations. Three months later, on April 17, 1867, Union Republicans met in Richmond and elected Bayne as their convention's vice president, as they planned for the upcoming Virginia Constitutional Convention, since Congress had conditioned readmission of Virginia and other Confederate states upon adopting new constitutions which did not permit slavery and which did permit African Americans to vote.

On October 22, 1867, Norfolk voters elected Bayne and Unionist Democrat Henry M. Bowden (1819–1871) to represent their city in the upcoming state constitutional convention.

The Virginia Constitutional Convention of 1868 first met on December 3, 1867 (the same day the 40th U.S. Congress convened), and Bayne was assigned to the Committee on Rules and Regulations and the Committee on the Executive Department of Government. However, the delegates soon adjourned until January.

Conservative Virginians had begun meeting in Richmond on December 11, led by Alexander H. H. Stuart of Staunton to select candidates opposed to whatever the convention would produce; some were particularly offended by the presence of African-American delegates, though their numbers were small, and some white voters had deliberately not voted in the October elections to elect constitutional convention delegates. By December 13, the Richmond Enquirer was lampooning the convention's African Americans.

The Constitutional Convention reconvened on January 2, 1868, and Bayne was perhaps the most powerful or outspoken African-American. He wanted to disenfranchise Confederates, as well as limit poll taxes in favor of high land taxes that could break up large estates, and was also among the minority who wanted to integrate public schools (public schools being an innovation in the constitution). Bayne also supported a resolution to continue the Freedmen's Bureau in Virginia, although seemingly outside the convention's mandate. On March 24, a fellow delegate offered a resolution limiting Bayne to five speeches per day. On April 17, 1868, the convention adjourned after passing a proposed constitution (and a controversial confederate disenfranchisement clause) by a vote of 51 to 36. Originally, the convention began with 105 members, of whom 72 were Radicals (including 25 African Americans), and 33 Conservatives.

On July 6, 1869, the Radical Republicans nominated Bayne as their candidate to Congress from the Second Congressional District. He lost to James H. Platt, Jr., whom Petersburg's voters had sent to the Constitutional Convention as their delegate. Bayne appealed to Congress, but no-one wanted to enforce the new constitution's rejected clause which would have disenfranchised Confederates and their sympathizers.

Moreover, months after federal troops left in early 1870, Conservatives won Norfolk's local election in May. John B. Whitehead defeated Radical Peter Dilworth, and Conservatives took over Norfolk's city council, although four blacks won city council seats. Bayne had been nominated by the Radicals for Commissioner of the Revenue, but voters elected Conservative Republican A.K. Hill, Esq. Bayne later ran for the post of physician to the almshouse. However, he lost a debate with Joseph T. Wilson, another African American and who had been running for customs officer and inspector, and whom the Norfolk Virginian considered the community's new negro leader.

However, Bayne continued in Norfolk. The censuses of 1870 and 1880 show him as living alone, with his status as widower noted on the latter.

== Death and legacy ==
In July 1887, Bayne wrote a will, leaving his property to his daughter and her children. The following May, he was admitted to the Central State Lunatic Asylum, in Petersburg. On July 7, the Norfolk Public Ledger published a postcard from the asylum's superintendent, indicating the dentist "Dr." Thomas Bayne, formerly politically prominent "with his race", had died two days before. However, Virginia maintained no record of his death, as Bain, Bayne or Nixon.

He is now mentioned on Norfolk's Underground Railroad walking tour, as well as the city's self-guided tour. Pennsylvania also mentions him concerning the Underground Railroad in Philadelphia.
