= Linus M. Nickerson =

- Born: June 22, 1823; Tompkins County, New York
- Died: September 12, 1888 (aged 65); Grafton, California
- Occupations: Minister, Chaplain
- Spouse: Hylena Knowles

Ecclesiastical career
- Religion: Methodist
- Offices held: teacher, Virginia Constitutional Convention delegate Indian Agent; Postmaster

Linus May Nickerson (June 22, 1823 – September 12, 1888) was a Methodist minister who also served as Chaplain of the 122nd New York Infantry, a Republican delegate to the Virginia Constitutional Convention of 1868, and an Indian Agent in Lake County, Oregon before his death in Grafton, California.

== Early and family life ==
Nickerson was born in rural Tompkins County, New York, on June 22, 1823, to Stephen Nickerson and his wife, the former Roxana May. In July 1851, Linus married Hylena Alnora Knowles, a blacksmith's daughter, in Cazenovia, New York. They had several children, of whom at least George (1857 in Onondaga, New York - 1926 in Mountain View, California) survived to adulthood. Their other children recorded on census forms included William (b. 1862), Roscoe (b. 1868), Buelah May (b. 1869, who died as an infant) and Grace (b. 1879).

== Career ==
By 1855, Linus Nickerson was a Methodist minister in rural central New York. He and his wife initially lived with her family in Pitcher, Chenango County, New York.

On August 28, 1862, Nickerson volunteered to become the Chaplain of the 122nd New York Infantry, then being recruited from the area. He received his chaplain's commission on September 10, 1862, and was discharged with the remainder of his unit, in Washington, D.C., on June 23, 1865

After discharge, Rev. Nickerson remained in Fairfax County, Virginia teaching African-Americans newly freed from slavery through the Freedmen's Bureau. Nickerson lived in Falls Church (now a suburb of Washington, D.C.) in 1867, when Fairfax County voters elected him and Orrin E. Hine to represent them at the Virginia Constitutional Convention of 1868. The 1870 federal census showed Nickerson as a clergyman owning real estate (probably the house), and noted that their 12-year-old son George, as well as a 13 year old waitress living with them named Sara French were of school age.

At some time after Congressional Reconstruction ended, Rev. Nickerson moved with his family to eastern Oregon. By 1877, he was the superintendent of farming at the Klamath Indian agency, with his wife as matron at the boarding school and eldest son George as one of two teachers. The following year he succeeded his boss, John H. Roork (whose wife or daughter was the other teacher) as Indian Agent for the Klamath and related indigenous people in Oregon. Nickerson was also appointed postmaster.

Three years later, his report to the Bureau of Indian Affairs noted the good relations tribal members had established with whites in the surrounding community. While agent Roork and his wife had left by 1883 (as had George Nickerson, who moved to Salem, Oregon by 1880), James F. Moore and William T. Leeks had arrived with their wives, and worked for Nickerson and the Klamath agency. Willie Nickerson became the office clerk and Hylena Nickerson had received a promotion to teacher.

== Death and legacy ==
Rev. Nickerson resigned from the Klamath agency because of ill-health, and moved to California, where his son George lived. He died in Grafton, California (a railroad town in rural Yolo County) on September 11, 1888. The following January, his widow Hylena received his veterans pension. His son George later joined the Loyal Legion based upon his father's service during the American Civil War.

== Online Link ==
- Linus Nickerson Cortland edu (Copyrighted)
