= Charles DeLano Hine =

US Army officer, civil engineer, lawyer and railway official (1867–1927)

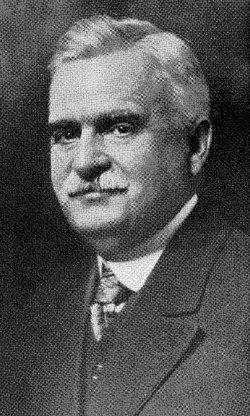
- Born: March 15, 1867; Vienna, Virginia, US
- Died: February 13, 1927 (aged 59); New York City, US
- Resting place: Arlington National Cemetery
- Education: United States Military Academy
- Occupation: civil engineer
- Spouse: Helen Underwood (m. 1915)

Charles DeLano Hine (March 15, 1867 – February 13, 1927) was an American civil engineer, lawyer, railway official, and Colonel in the United States Army. He receives academic credit for studying organizations as a separate field, rather than a "smaller sister of sociology.".

== Early and family life ==
Born in Vienna, Virginia, to former Union veteran Capt. Orrin E. Hine and his wife Alma, Hine graduated from United States Military Academy, West Point in June 1891, and served as a lieutenant in the 6th United States Infantry. While stationed at Newport Barracks in northern Kentucky, he completed a bachelor of laws degree at Cincinnati Law School in 1893. He married Helen Underwood on March 27, 1915. She was the daughter of former lieutenant governor of Kentucky John C. Underwood.

== Career ==
Leaving the Army in August 1895 to enter railway service, Hine worked as freight brakeman, switchman, yardmaster, emergency conductor, chief clerk to superintendent, and trainmaster. When the Spanish–American War began in 1898 he quit railway service and participated in the Santiago campaign as a major of volunteers. After the war he re-entered railway work, rising to trainmaster and later general superintendent. Subsequently, he did special railway work in various staff positions for both large and small railways in the United States, Canada and Mexico.

Hine inspected safety appliances for the Interstate Commerce Commission. In 1907 Hine assisted in revising the business methods of the Department of the Interior at Washington, D.C. Then he was appointed bankruptcy receiver of the Washington, Arlington & Falls Church Electric Railway.

In 1910, Hine became temporary special representative of President Taft, planning ways to improve the organization and methods of the executive departments of the United States government. Meantime, in July, 1908, he had become special representative of Mr. Julius Kruttschnitt, director of maintenance and operation of the Harriman Lines, and had entered on a study of the needs of the operating organization of those railways and of the means that should be adopted to meet those needs. This report led most of the Harriman Lines to adopt the unit system of organization.

On January 15, 1912, Major Hine became vice-president and general manager of the Southern Pacific Lines in Mexico and the Arizona Eastern, responsible for about 1,600 miles of railway.

During World War I, on August 5, 1917, Hine (then living in New York City) was drafted to serve as a Colonel of Infantry for New York's National Guard. His unit was sent overseas, and participated at Saint-Mihiel before the war ended and he was honorably discharged on January 10, 1919.

== Death and legacy ==
Hine died in Manhattan in 1927. After a funeral at St. Thomas Episcopal Church in which pall bearers included the President of the Lackawanna Railroad, Orlando Harriman Jr. and various distinguished military officers, he was interred at Arlington National Cemetery, and his widow awarded a pension based on his military service.

== Publications ==
=== Modern Organization: An Exposition of the Unit System, 1912 ===
In the 1912 article "The unit system on the Harriman Lines" in the Engineering Magazine Hine wrote:

Organization has been termed a smaller sister of sociology, the science of human nature. Industrial organization, including that of transportation and commerce, reflects and typifies in a greater or less degree the sociological development of a people."

His series of articles were republished in the 1912 book, entitled "Modern Organization: An Exposition of the Unit System." In this work Hine also stated:

The greatest present need is an antidote for the unwillingness of men to profit by the previous experience of others. It would be amusing, were it not so expensive, to watch the gropings of many corporation officers for methods to test efficiency. Ignorant of fundamental principles, intolerant of outside suggestions, unable to detect the analogy in other undertakings, they repeat the expensive experiments of the past.

A 1913 review in the Journal of Accountancy stated that Hines was "a firm believer in the personal equation in industry, commerce and all departments of business. Basing his argument to a great extent upon the successful operation of the unit system as applied on the so-called "Harriman lines" he goes step by step through the ideal method of management and operation to what he considers the practical solution of the difficulties which he encounters."

== Selected publications ==
- Hine, Charles De Lano. Letters from an old railway official, to his son, a division superintendent. (1904)
- Hine, Charles De Lano. Letters from an Old Railway Official: Second Series. His Son, a General Manager. Vol. 2. Simmons-Boardman Publishing Company, 1912.
- Hine, Charles De Lano. Modern Organization: An Exposition of the Unit System, by Charles De Lano Hine. Engineering Magazine Company, 1912.
