= Edward K. Snead =

Virginia lawyer and slaveholder

- Born: 1827; St. George's, Virginia, U.S.
- Died: c. 1875; Onancock, Virginia, U.S.
- Spouses: Mary D. Wallop (1830-1869); Helen Robinson Jarvis
- Children: 1

Edward Ker Snead (1827 – c. 1875), a Virginia lawyer and slaveholder in Accoumack County on Virginia's Eastern Shore, became a judge in Norfolk and Portsmouth, Virginia during the Union occupation late in the American Civil War, and later was elected one of Accomack County's two delegates to the Virginia Constitutional Convention of 1868, and even later became a federal tax collector on the Eastern Shore.

== Early and family life ==
Edward Ker Snead was born near historic St. George's Church in Accomack County to the former Susan Upsur Dennis (1799-1864) and her husband, Edward Smith Snead (1793-1853). He had a younger brother, Dr. John D. Snead (1829-1866), and younger sisters Susan Upshur Snead (1838-1930), Margaret Ker Snead (1839-1935) and Elizabeth Dennis Snead (b. 1842). In the 1830 U.S. Federal Census, his father owned 15 slaves, which number decreased to 14 slaves in the 1840 Census, but increased to 22 slaves in the 1850 Census. In the 1860 U.S. Federal Census for Accomack County, Edward K. Snead listed himself as 32 years old and a lawyer, and lived with his wife and young daughter, as well as his 60 year old widowed mother and 29 year old brother, physician John D. Snead. Edward Snead owned four slaves according to the associated federal slave schedules (a 60 year old woman and 25, 33 and 45 year old males), and his brother Dr. John D. Snead owned 11 enslaved people (including 2 boys and an infant girl).

Three years after his wife, the former Mary Wallop (1830-1869) died, leaving a young daughter who failed to reach adulthood, Edward Snead remarried fellow Eastern Shore native Helen Robinson Jarvis (1851-1929) in Onancock, Virginia, who would survive him and remarry. They had a daughter, Mary Evelyn Snead Hoffman (1874-after 1940), who would marry in Alexandria, Virginia, then move to Baltimore, Maryland and Pittsburgh, Pennsylvania and retire in Miami, Florida.

== Career ==
During the American Civil War, Union troops commanded by Major General John A. Dix captured the Eastern shore of Maryland by July 1861. In November 1861, General Dix sent Delmarva peninsula native Brigadier General Henry H. Lockwood (of Kent County, Delaware and stationed at Cambridge, Maryland) southward to occupy the Peninsula's southern end, known as Virginia's Eastern shore. Around November 15, Dix and Lockwood promised to restore trade with those counties as well as the lights in their lighthouses, and protect private property if residents would not resist the Union occupying troops.

Although every able-bodied white man between the ages of 18 and 45 years old was already a member of the local Virginia militia, Col. Charles Smith of Ingleside in Eastville only led about 800 soldiers and 1200 militiamen to defend those two Virginia counties from the massing Union forces. He decided to retreat rather than fight the 4500 Union troops that gathered at Newtown (now Pocomoke, Maryland). About 44 officers and 64 enlisted men escaped across the Chesapeake Bay to Gloucester and Norfolk counties (until they too fell to Union forces in 1862). A total of 244 men from Northampton and 197 men from Accomack County would serve in the Confederate Army. However, Edward K. Snead was not among those choosing to escape to fight for the Confederacy, but rather used his legal skills to maintain and restore order near his home.

By June 21, 1864, Snead had traveled across the Chesapeake Bay to serve as a judge in Union-occupied Norfolk, Virginia. He wrote Secretary of War Edwin M. Stanton in Washington D.C. to complain about a Union general preventing the civilian trials of various people indicted in the circuit court for not paying license taxes. In 1868, voters in Accomack and Northampton counties elected Edward Snead and Maryland-born Union officer James C. Toy to represent them at the Virginia Constitutional Convention of 1868. The convention was necessary because Virginia's Constitution adopted in 1850 explicitly allowed slavery, and few Virginians considered the convention held during the Union occupation in the Civil War valid. Although certain provisions restricting civil rights of former Confederates were controversial and not adopted in 1869, the constitution drafted by Snead, Toy and their fellow delegates was ratified by Virginia voters and the Commonwealth soon allowed to rejoin the Union.

In 1870, Edward K. Snead remained in the former Union headquarters at Hampton (formerly Old Point Comfort), and was one of eight employees of the U.S. Treasury Department's Bureau of Statistics in Virginia. By 1873, he had moved his tax collection activities back to the Eastern Shore, specifically to Onancock in his native Accomack County.

== Death and legacy ==
Edward K. Snead died before 1875, when his widow remarried, to widower and farmer William Joshua Fitchett of Northampton County (1838-1912). She would move to Baltimore and later Philadelphia, while their daughter would marry in Alexandria, Virginia in 1896, and move with her Baltimore-born husband to Pittsburgh and later retire in Miami, Florida.
