= James W. Hunnicutt =

American politician (1814–1880)

- Born: October 16, 1814; Pendleton District, South Carolina, U.S.
- Died: October 8, 1880 (aged 65); Washington, DC, U.S.
- Education: Randolph-Macon College
- Occupation: Minister Editor
- Title: Pastor, Delegate, Editor

James W. Hunnicutt (October 16, 1814 – October 8, 1880) was a 19th-century American religious leader, newspaper editor and politician from Virginia.

== Early life ==
Hunnicutt was born in Pendleton District, South Carolina in 1814. Following a religious experience about age 18, he became a minister in the Methodist Episcopal Church, then attended Randolph-Macon College in Ashland, Virginia in 1834-1836 but did not graduate, marrying Martha Frances Smith of Lunenburg County, Virginia that year. They had six children.

== Career ==
Hunnicutt disapproved of infant baptism practiced by the Methodists and founded the pre-Civil War denomination of Union Baptists in 1841. The following year he published "A summary of the doctrines held and maintained by the Union Baptists: to which is annexed a recantation of infant baptism", and began establishing congregations in Virginia and eastern North Carolina.

In 1847, Hunnicutt moved to Fredericksburg, Virginia, founding the weekly newspaper, the Christian Banner. Following the death of his first wife in 1850, he remarried in 1854 to Elvira Magers Samuel. A proslavery man who opposed the establishment of an African American Baptist Church in Fredericksburg in 1854, in 1857 he was one of the city's delegation to the Southern Commercial Convention in Knoxville, Tennessee.

A Unionist, Hunnicutt sought a fusion between the two Democratic Party factions in Virginia and the Constitutional Union Party. Its candidate John Bell won Virginia's Electoral College votes, and during the Virginia Secession Convention of 1861 in March 1861, Hunnicutt held a pro-Union meeting in Fredericksburg. It was disrupted by local secessionists who pressured him to suspend the Christian Banner and vote publicly for secession at the May 23 referendum to retain his congregation.

Hunnicutt resumed publication of the Christian Banner during Union occupation of Fredericksburg, but when Federal troops withdrew from Fredericksburg in August 1862, he relocated to Philadelphia, Pennsylvania, where he published a collection of his editorials titled "The Conspiracy Unveiled". There he began a speaking career championing the Union and campaigning for Republican candidates.

The Virginia Capitol at Richmond VA where 19th century Conventions met

Following the American Civil War, Hunnicutt returned to Richmond at the end of 1865 to publish a Republican newspaper, the New Nation. He stressed full legal rights for the freedmen and the right of black militia units to drill under arms. During 1866 and 1867 made popular speeches among large Richmond crowds, and organized the city's African American voters with black businessman Albert Royal Brooks. In the April 1867 Republican Party state convention held at the First African Baptist Church in Richmond, Hunnicutt was elected to the parties executive committee and aligned with the radical faction against moderates such as Republican Governor Francis H. Pierpont.

In 1867, Hunnicutt was elected to the Virginia Constitutional Convention of 1868. He was one of five delegates elected from the central Piedmont constitutional convention district made up of his home district of Richmond City. During the Convention, Hunnicutt was chair of the Committee on the Elective Franchise and Qualifications for Office. His committee recommended voting by secret ballot and blacks serving on juries which were adopted by the Convention, but other Radicals pushed disenfranchisement of former Confederates further than he could vote for. The disabling clauses were not adopted in the July 1869 referendum ratifying the proposed Constitution.

Nevertheless, Hunnicutt lost influence among the Radical faction of the Republican Party, a competitor, the Daily State Journal moved from Alexandria to Richmond and it took the government printing contract that had formerly gone to Hunnicutt's New Nation. Hunnicutt aligned with the moderate "True Republicans", but lost to Charles H. Porter in his 1869 bid for Congress even though Hunnicutt was endorsed by the Conservative Richmond Daily Dispatch.

Hunnicutt retired from public life, living on Brook Station farm in Stafford County, Virginia nearby Fredericksburg. His was unsuccessful in his petitions to Congress for relief from financial loss during the Civil War.

== Death ==
James W. Hunnicutt died in Stafford County, Virginia on October 8, 1880. He is buried in the Fredericksburg City Cemetery.

== Bibliography ==
- "James W. Hunnicutt (1814-1880)". Encyclopedia Virginia. Library of Virginia.
- Pulliam, David Loyd (1901). The Constitutional Conventions of Virginia from the foundation of the Commonwealth to the present time. John T. West, Richmond. ISBN 978-1-2879-2059-5.
