= John C. Woodson =

American politician

Member of the Virginia House of Delegates from the Rockingham County, Virginia district
- In office October 5, 1869 – December 5, 1871 Serving with Charles Grattan, John H. Hopkins
- Preceded by: John T. Harris
- Succeeded by: S.A. Coffman

Member of the Virginia House of Delegates from the Rockingham County district
- In office December 4, 1865 – April 29, 1867 Serving with W.G. Thompson, H.B. Harnsberger
- Preceded by: John T. Harris
- Succeeded by: Philo Bradley

Personal details
- Born: December 25, 1823 Richmond, Virginia, U.S.
- Died: April 24, 1875 (aged 51) Harrisonburg, Virginia, U.S.
- Spouse: Sarah
- Education: University of Virginia
- Occupation: Lawyer

John Chesterfield Woodson (December 25, 1823 – April 24, 1875) was a nineteenth-century American lawyer and politician from Virginia. Two earlier distantly related men of the same name had served in the Virginia General Assembly: John Woodson Sr. represented Goochland County before the Revolutionary War in the House of Burgesses and in two Revolutionary Conventions and married Dorothea Randolph, the aunt of future president Thomas Jefferson) and John Woodson Jr. another represented Cumberland County in the Virginia House of Delegates between 1788 and 1791.

== Early and family life ==
This John Woodson was born on Christmas Day, 1823 to Jacob Woodson and his wife, the former Elizabeth Brown. The Woodson family could trace its ancestry to Dr. John Woodson who emigrated to the Virginia colony from Dorsetshire, England in 1619 on the same ship as Governor George Yardley, and lived in Henrico Colony, as would many of his descendants (with every generation recycling their ancestor's name), although others moved westward along the James River from Curles Plantation in Henrico County, at times intermarrying with the First Families of Virginia or early Huguenots. The name Jacob became more common in the Woodson family after a third generation descendant married Jacob Michaux, descended from the Huguenots who had settled at Manakintown above the falls of the James River after 1700, and descendants from Price Edward County and Buckingham County revolutionary war patriots both married daughters of one or more men named Jacob Woodson. This John Woodson attended the University of Virginia from 1848–51. He also read law with a lawyer in the state capital (Richmond) allied with the Whig party.

== Personal life ==
Woodson married Sarah E. Amiss of Pendleton County in Highland County, Virginia on November 16, 1848. They had children Edmund (b. 1849), Andrew Dyer (b. 1851), Katherine Elizabeth (1854-1944), Frank (b. 1857), Robert Lee (1862-1933), Thomas Chapman(b. 1868) and John H. (b. 1869)

== Career ==
The Virginia Capitol at Richmond VA where 19th century Conventions met

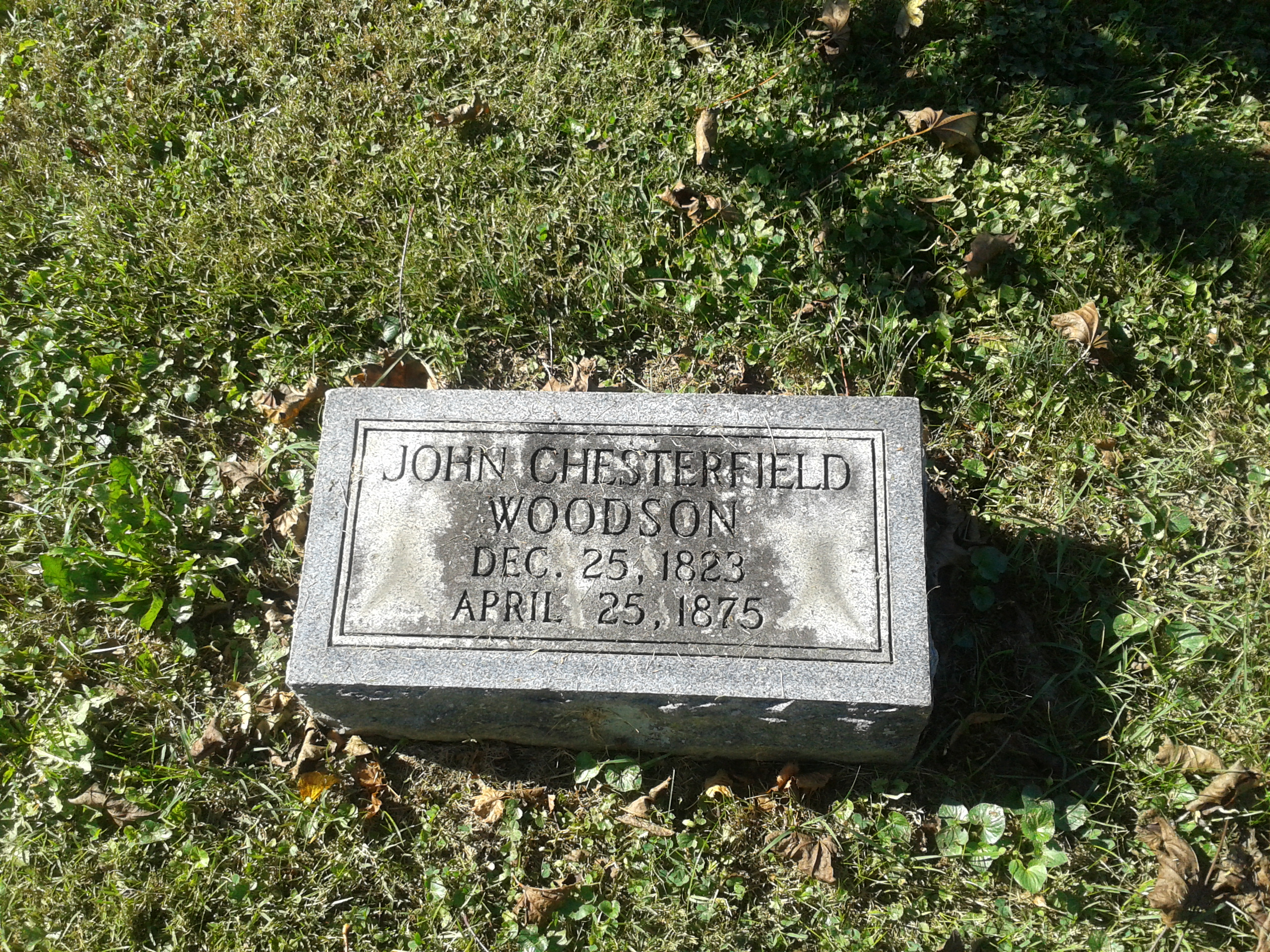
Woodson's grave at Woodbine Cemetery

In 1847, Woodson became a member of the Virginia Bar and moved westward to the state's Appalachian region. He became Commonwealth's Attorney for Highland and Pendleton County, both west of the Shenandoah Valley, but by 1860 had moved somewhat back to Harrisonburg, Virginia, the county seat for Rockingham County and owned one slave.

During the American Civil War, Woodson served as quartermaster for the 146th Confederate militia regiment. Rockingham County voters also elected Woodhouse to the House of Delegates alongside Charles Grattan and John H. Hopkins, but Woodson resigned that part-time position and S.A. Coffman was elected in his place.

As Virginia's Presidential Reconstruction began, Rockingham County voters again elected Woodson to the General Assembly for the session from 1865 to 1867, and he served alongside W.G. Thompson and H.B. Harnsberger.

In 1867, Rockingham County voters elected Conservatives Woodson and Jacob N. Liggett to represent them in the Virginia Constitutional Convention of 1868.

== Death ==
John C. Woodson died in Harrisonburg, Virginia on April 24, 1875, and was buried in now-historic Woodbine cemetery, although his father, who may have died in 1870, is buried in Richmond's Hollywood cemetery.

== Bibliography ==
- Pulliam, David Loyd (1901). The Constitutional Conventions of Virginia from the foundation of the Commonwealth to the present time. John T. West, Richmond. ISBN 978-1-2879-2059-5.
- Swem, Earl Greg (1918). A Register of the General Assembly of Virginia, 1776-1918, and of the Constitutional Conventions. David Bottom, Superintendent of Public Printing. ISBN 978-1-3714-6242-0.
