= Henry Dickinson =

Henry Dickinson may refer to:

- Henry F. Dickinson (1873–1961), American lawyer
- Henry Winram Dickinson (1870–1952), British engineering historian and biographer
