= Frank Moss (Virginia politician) =

American politician

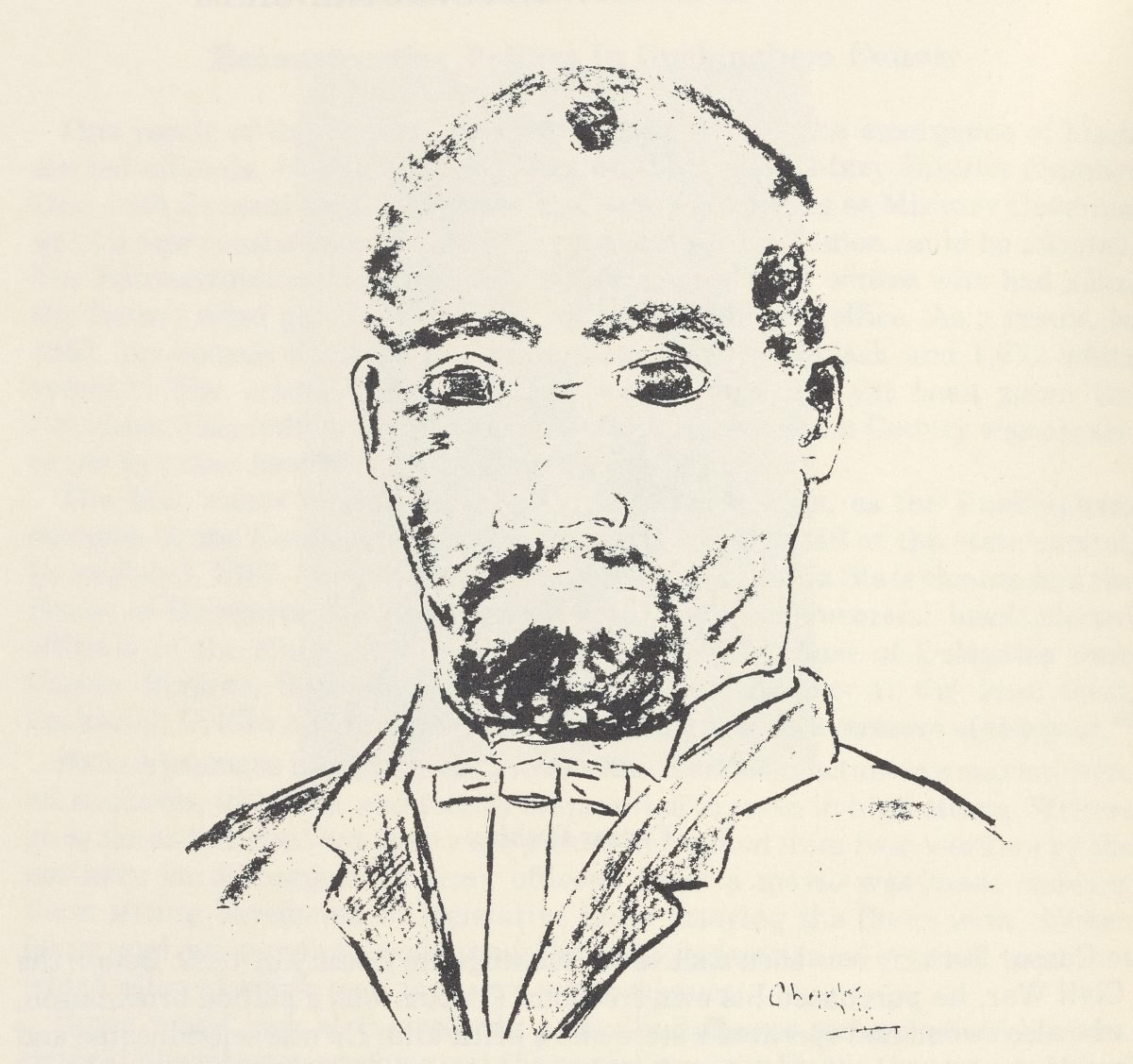

Member of the Virginia Senate from the Buckingham and Appomattox Counties district
- In office October 5, 1869 – December 5, 1871
- Preceded by: James Galt
- Succeeded by: George C. Hundley

Member of the Virginia House of Delegates from the Buckingham County district
- In office January 1, 1874 – November 30, 1875
- Preceded by: James H. Noble
- Succeeded by: R.T. Hubard, Jr.

Personal details
- Born: c. 1823 Buckingham County, Virginia, U.S.
- Party: Republican
- Spouse: Amanda Moss
- Occupation: Farmer, Minister

Frank Moss (born c. 1823, died c. 1883–84) was a free-born nineteenth-century African-American farmer and politician from Buckingham County, Virginia. He was the only African-American in Virginia to be a member of the Constitutional Convention, the Virginia Senate and the Virginia House of Delegates.

== Early life ==
Moss was born in Buckingham County, Virginia of an African-American family that had been free for several generations. He married Amanda Moss (9 years younger than he), and they had a daughter Mary Moss (b. 1857) and sons Davy Moss (b. 1860), George Moss (b. 1862), Benjamin Moss (b. 1866) and Frank Moss (b. 1878), although by 1880 neither Mary nor Davy lived with their parents.

== Career ==
The Virginia Capitol building in Richmond, Virginia, where 19th century conventions met.

Moss farmed in Buckingham County near the James River, with the nearest post office at Curdsville, Virginia. As a minister, he held a leadership position, particularly among African Americans in his county and neighboring Appomattox County.

In 1867, Buckingham County voters elected Moss to the Virginia Constitutional Convention of 1868. A Republican, he was the sole delegate for Buckingham County alone, although J. Henry Williams represented part of Buckingham County, together with Amherst and Nelson Counties, all in Virginia's central Piedmont region and during that convention.

After Virginia voters overwhelmingly approved the constitution crafted by that convention, Appomattox and Buckingham County voters elected Moss to the Virginia state Senate, where he served one term (a part-time position; during the 1869/70 and 1870/71 General Assembly sessions).

By the 1870 census, Moss owned 15 acres, and added to his landholding in 1875; the 1880 census enumerates his land as 25 acres tilled and 80 acres of woodland, appraising it as worth $600, with an additional $90 of livestock and $200 of equipment, so he was among the wealthier farmers in his district.

After redistricting of his senate district to include Fluvanna County, Moss ran for the House of Delegates instead. He was elected to succeed James H. Noble as Buckingham County's delegate and served one term. R.T. Hubard Jr. succeeded him on December 1, 1875.

== Death ==
The dates and circumstances of his death and burial are unknown. A November 1883 newspaper report indicated that Moss was still active within the Republican Party of Buckingham County, while an August 1884 newspaper article described Moss as already being dead by that point.

== See also ==
- African American officeholders from the end of the Civil War until before 1900

== Bibliography ==
- Jackson, Luther Porter (1945). Negro Office-Holders in Virginia, 1865–1895. Guide Quality Press, Norfolk, Virginia. ISBN 9780598580269.
- Pulliam, David Loyd (1901). The Constitutional Conventions of Virginia from the foundation of the Commonwealth to the present time. John T. West, Richmond. ISBN 978-1-2879-2059-5. also available at "HathiTrust".
- Swem, Earl Greg (1918). A Register of the General Assembly of Virginia, 1776–1918, and of the Constitutional Conventions. David Bottom, Superintendent of Public Printing. ISBN 978-1-3714-6242-0.
