= 37th Virginia Infantry Regiment =

Infantry regiment of the Confederate States Army

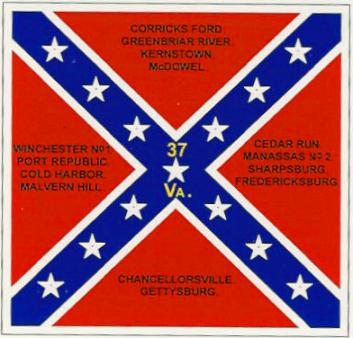
- Regimental color of the 37th Virginia
- Active: 1861–1865
- Disbanded: April 1865
- Country: Confederate States
- Allegiance: Virginia
- Branch: Army
- Type: Infantry
- Size: Regiment
- Facings: Light blue
- Battles: American Civil War; First Battle of Kernstown; Battle of McDowell; Jackson's Valley Campaign; Seven Days' Battles; Second Battle of Bull Run; Battle of Cedar Mountain; Battle of Antietam; Battle of Fredericksburg; Battle of Chancellorsville; Battle of Gettysburg; Battle of Cold Harbor; Siege of Petersburg; Battle of Sayler's Creek; Appomattox Campaign

The 37th Virginia Infantry Regiment was an infantry formation of the Confederate States Army in the Eastern Theater of the American Civil War.

== History ==
The 37th Virginia was organized in Washington County, Virginia, in May 1861, and accepted in Confederate service in July, when two more units were added. The regiment was in combat at First Kernstown and McDowell, then took part in Jackson's Valley Campaign. During the war it was assigned to General Taliaferro's, Colston's, Steuart's, and W. Terry's Brigade, Army of Northern Virginia. The 37th was involved in many conflicts from the Seven Days' Battles to Cold Harbor, moved with Early to the Shenandoah Valley, then participated in the final campaign at Appomattox.

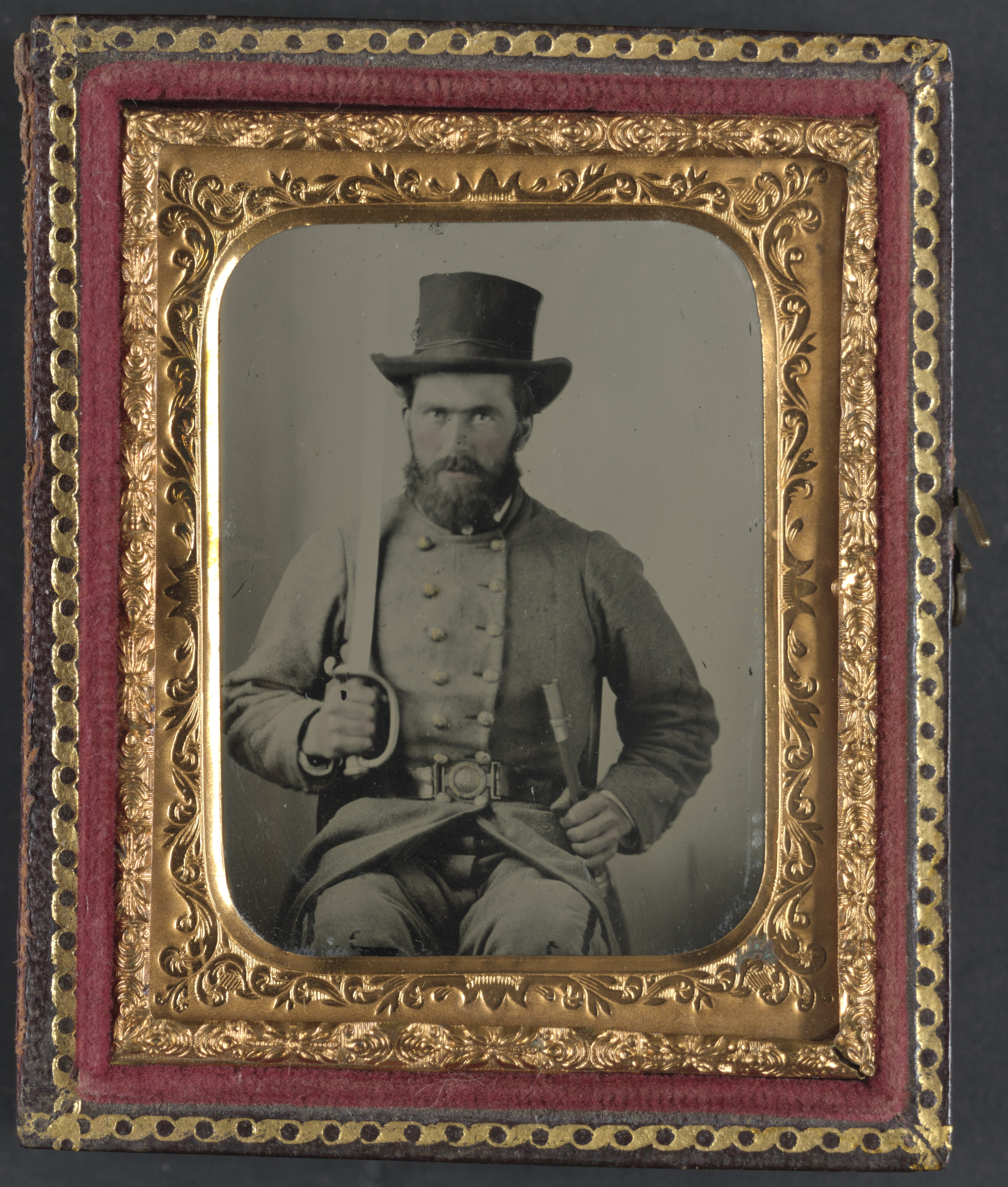
Private Luther H. Clapp, Company C, 37th Virginia Infantry Regiment.

It totaled 846 men in December 1861, sustained 113 casualties at First Kernstown and had 5 killed and 34 wounded at McDowell. The regiment reported 12 killed and 76 wounded at Cedar Mountain, 5 killed and 36 wounded at Second Manassas, and 22 killed, 101 wounded, and 9 missing at Chancellorsville. More than thirty percent of the 264 at Gettysburg were disabled and many from the grossly undermanned regiment were captured at Spotsylvania. Only 2 officers and 39 men surrendered. at Appomattox Courthouse.

The field officers were Colonels Samuel V. Fulkerson and Titus V. Williams, Lieutenant Colonels Robert P. Carson and John F. Terry, and Major Henry C. Wood.

== See also ==
- List of Virginia Civil War units
