= James H. Platt Jr. =

American politician

Member of the U.S. House of Representatives from Virginia's 2nd district
- In office January 26, 1870 – March 3, 1875
- Preceded by: John Millson (1861)
- Succeeded by: John Goode

Chairman of the Committee on Public Buildings and Grounds
- In office March 4, 1873 – March 3, 1875
- Preceded by: George Armstrong Halsey
- Succeeded by: William Steele Holman

Personal details
- Born: James H. Platt Jr. July 13, 1837 Saint John, Colony of New Brunswick
- Died: August 13, 1894 (aged 57) Clear Creek County, Colorado
- Party: Republican
- Education: University of Vermont
- Profession: businessman

Military service
- Allegiance: United States of America
- Branch/service: Union Army
- Rank: Lieutenant Colonel
- Unit: 3rd Vermont Infantry
- Battles/wars: American Civil War

James Henry Platt Jr. (July 13, 1837 – August 13, 1894) was an American physician, politician and businessman. After participating in the Virginia Constitutional Convention of 1868, Platt represented Virginia's 2nd congressional district in the U.S. House of Representatives for two terms, from 1870 to 1875.

== Early and family life ==
Born in either Vermont or across the border in Saint John, New Brunswick, Canada, in the summer of 1837 to Josiah Platt and his wife Sophia, James Platt was raised in Burlington, Vermont. He attended the common schools.

Platt completed preparatory studies and graduated from the medical department of the University of Vermont at Burlington in 1859 when he was 23. On February 23, 1859 he married Sarah C. Foster in Rutland, Vermont. He later married the suffragist and widow Sarah Sophia Chase Decker (1856–1912), who survived him. The second Mrs. Sarah Platt was from McIndoe Falls, Caledonia County, Vermont, and after another remarriage (to Colorado judge Westbrook Schoonmaker Decker) became the first President of the Denver Women's Club and national president of the Federation of Associated Women's Clubs.

== Career ==
Platt practiced medicine in Vermont. During the Civil War, Platt joined the Union Army as first sergeant of the Third Regiment, Vermont Volunteer Infantry. He was promoted to captain and eventually lieutenant colonel. He declined assignment to duty as chief quartermaster of the Sixth Corps.

After the war, Platt settled in Petersburg, Virginia, and on April 6, 1865, and was elected to serve on the city council. In 1867, Petersburg voters also elected Platt as a member of the Virginia Constitutional Convention of 1868.

Platt moved to Norfolk, Virginia before voters ratified that Constitution (and thereby satisfied Congressional requirements for Virginia's readmission to the Union). Platt then ran as a Republican, and won election to the U.S. Congress, representing Virginia's 2nd congressional district to the Forty-first, Forty-second, and Forty-third Congresses. He served from January 26, 1870, to March 3, 1875, including as chairman of the Committee on Public Buildings and Grounds (Forty-third Congress).

In 1874, conservative politicians won throughout Virginia after the Panic of 1873 led to financial depression, and Platt lost his re-election bid. Democrat (and ex-Confederate congressman) John Goode won 49.43% of the vote, easily defeating both Platt and Independent Republican Robert Norton, and represented the district in the Forty-fourth Congress.

Platt moved to New York in 1876 and engaged in the manufacture of oil products, as well as continued his medical career as director of the Mineola Children's Home.

While in New York, Platt remarried, and soon moved with his wife to Denver, Colorado in 1887. He had various business ventures, including insurance, paper manufacturing and mining.

== Death and legacy ==
On August 13, 1894, Platt was found drowned in Green Lake, near Georgetown, Colorado.

U.S. House of Representatives
Preceded by John Millson (1861)	Member of the U.S. House of Representatives from Virginia's 2nd congressional district 1870–1875	Succeeded by John Goode, Jr.
Political offices
Preceded by George Armstrong Halsey; New Jersey	Chairman of Committee on Public Buildings and Grounds; 1873–1875	Succeeded by William Steele Holman; Indiana
