= J. Henry Williams =

American clergyman (1831–1889)

- Born: 1831; Great Britain
- Died: 1889 (aged 57–58); New York, U.S.
- Education: General Theological Seminary
- Occupations: Minister, delegate, philanthropist
- Spouse: Indiana Fletcher Williams

James Henry Williams (1831 – 1889) was a nineteenth-century Episcopal priest and philanthropist from New York who married an heiress from Virginia who ultimately founded Sweet Briar College after their only child, Daisy, predeceased them.

== Early life ==
Williams was born in either Ireland or England in 1830 to William H. Williams and his wife H.G. After studies at Trinity College (either Trinity College, Dublin, Trinity College, Cambridge or Trinity College, Oxford), and becoming a member of the Phi Kappa Society, Williams emigrated to the United States. He became a candidate for orders at the General Theological Seminary in New York in 1856, and graduated in 1858.

== Career ==
Ordained a minister in the Episcopal Church, Rev. Williams served at Zion Episcopal Church in Dobbs Ferry, New York during the American Civil War. After the war ended, he traveled to Amherst County, Virginia to visit 35 year old Indiana Fletcher, whom he had met as a seminarian in New York during her travels. Her late father, teacher turned businessman and farmer Elijah Fletcher had owned plantations and valuable real estate as well as a cattle trading business in nearby Lynchburg (receiving cattle from his brother in the state of Indiana and selling them in Virginia), and had helped found St. Paul's Episcopal Church in Lynchburg as well as Ascension Episcopal Church in Amherst. Indiana Fletcher had inherited much upon his death in 1858 (her troublesome brother Lucien received his inheritance circa 1850, during his father's life), but had never married. Her younger sister Elizabeth, had married, but with her husband had squandered much of that inheritance. After the war, her marriage prospects were minimal, and emancipation of formerly enslaved people had greatly changed plantation management.

On August 23, 1865, Rev. Williams married Indiana Fletcher in Amherst County, and the newlyweds took the train back to New York. The bishop of New York granted Rev. Williams permission to retire from his position, although he would later serve as assistant minister in Amherst. J. Henry Williams and his wife had one child, Maria Georgianna "Daisy" Williams (1867-1883). During winters, which her parents spent in New York City, Daisy attended Miss Haines' School in Gramercy Square; she would die in Manhattan on January 22, 1884.

Meanwhile, Williams and his wife resumed operation of Sweet Briar plantation. Williams was later elected the Amherst county clerk, although he used experienced deputies to perform those functions.

In 1867, voters of Amherst, Nelson and Buckingham Counties elected Williams to the Virginia Constitutional Convention of 1868. Although he had never served in the Confederate forces (and his black sheep brother-in-law Lucian Fletcher had been demoted to private and spent much of the American Civil War subject to Confederate courts martial and jails), and military governor Gen. Schofield considered him a Republican, Rev. Williams often voted with the Convention's conservative members and vehemently objected to clauses disenfranchising former Confederates as beyond the Convention's authority. Although the Convention approved such clauses, the following year, voters rejected them, while overwhelmingly approving the Constitution of 1869 as a whole.

In New York City, Williams operated a small hotel at 260 4th Avenue during the winters, but closed it and returned to the mountains of Amherst County during the summers. Thus, the 1880 census found him (as a minister and farmer) in Virginia, and also tabulated his wife Indiana and their daughter Maria (nicknamed Daisy).

== Death ==
Following his daughter's death, the grief-stricken Williams buried her at Sweet Briar. He ordered a winged angel statue to mark her grave, endowed a window at Amherst's Ascension Church in her honor, and wrote his own will on November 12, 1885. That named his wife as executrix and beneficiary, as well as indicated his desire that a trust be established for the education of children under the auspices of the Protestant Episcopal Church and as a memorial of their late daughter. Williams and his wife moved back to New York, where he died about five years after his daughter. His widow (who never remarried) would found Sweet Briar College, by funding a trust at her death with Virginia's Episcopal bishop Alfred Magill Randolph and two priests (Rev. Theodore Carson of St. Paul's and Rev. Arthur Gray of Ascension) as trustees, along with her long-term farm manager (Stephen R. Harding). That trust would be the subject of extensive litigation on three different occasions, as enumerated in the Sweet Briar College article.
