= John Woodson Jr. =

Virginia politician and landowner

John Woodson

Member of the Virginia House of Delegates for Cumberland County, Virginia
- In office June 23, 1788 – September 30, 1792 Serving with Creed Taylor, William Macon, John Holcombe
- Preceded by: Mayo Carrington
- Succeeded by: Joseph Carrington

Personal details
- Born: circa 1744 Goochland County, Virginia
- Died: September 24, 1821 Cartersville, Cumberland County, Virginia
- Resting place: The Deanery graveyard, Cartersville, Virginia
- Spouse(s): Joanna (Howlett) Booker; Elizabeth(Raines) Venable
- Occupation: planter, politician

John Woodson (circa 1744 – September 24, 1821), was a Virginia planter and politician who served four terms in the Virginia General Assembly representing Cumberland County, Virginia, from 1788 to 1792.

== Early life and education ==
Born to the former Mary Miller and her husband John Woodson (d. 1789), Woodson was descended on both sides from early Virginia settlers. He had an elder brother Miller Woodson and sisters Ann, Sarah, Mary, Judith (who married Capt. Joseph Michaux) and Susannah. John Woodson Jr. received a private education appropriate to his class, and fought in the American Revolutionary War, as did numerous relatives including his elder brother Miller Woodson, who would serve as clerk of Cumberland County (or nearby Prince Edward County) for several decades as would his namesake son and grandson, and whose son Tsharner de Graffenreid Woodson became deputy clerk (the unusual name honoring his paternal grandfather who emigrated from Switzerland) and whose grandson Blake Baker Woodson became clerk of Fayette County, Virginia (now West Virginia) and later of Cumberland County until the mid-1880s.

== Personal life ==
Woodson married twice. His first wife, the former Joanna Booker, daughter of James Booker and the former Elizabeth Howlett (both of prominent families in Southside Virginia), bore six sons and two daughters before her death. His eldest son, Booker Woodson (b. 1769) remained a farmer in nearby Buckingham County, whereas Peter Woodson moved to Robertson County, Tennessee, Benjamin Woodson moved to Rockingham County, North Carolina after his marriage to his stepsister Martha Ann Venable, Joseph Woodson moved to Montgomery County, Tennessee, and only the youngest, James B. Woodson remained in Cumberland County (where he also married twice). This man's second wife, the widow Elizabeth Raine Venable, widow of John Venable, bore another son (John Miller Woodson who moved to Roanoke, Virginia and ultimately to Howard County, Missouri). Woodson also had six daughters: Elizabeth (who married William Wright and died by 1845), Judith (who married Thomas Gannaway), Susanna who married Joseph Williams and also moved to Roanoke Missouri, Polly who married John Garrett, Nancy who married Joseph Ligon, and Sarah who married Byrd Smith who moved several times (from Kentucky to Halifax County, Virginia east of Cumberland County, then westward to Danville, Virginia and finally ended up in Howard County, Missouri).

== Career ==
Woodson and his father or distant cousin of the same name also operated plantations, a ferry, a tobacco warehouse and other businesses in Cumberland County near Cartersville using enslaved labor long before the American Revolutionary War. The ferry connected Cumberland County on the south side of the James River with Goochland and Albermarle Counties on the northern bank. During the conflict, Cartersville was a military supply depot and logistics center. In fact, either this man or his father donated the 27 acres of land at Carter's Ferry which the legislature incorporated as Cartersville in 1790. Complicating matters was a 4th generation John Woodson and two other 5th generation John Woodsons. The most important was John Woodson of Goochland County (who was the grandson of Robert Woodson) who married Dorothea Randolph (daughter of burgess and planter Isham Randolph of Dungeness), had a dozen children and served many terms in the Virginia General Assembly representing Goochland County. Another 5th generation John Woodson also descended from that 2nd generation Robert Woodson ultimately moved to Cartersville and died in 1793. That man (son of Joseph Woodson of Henrico County) had married Elizabeth Hughes and had three daughters as well as a son also named John who died in Cartersville in 1832 (that 6th generation John Jr. who lived for some time at "Bear Garden" plantation in Buckingham County). That John Jr. had married Ann Pleasants and his sister Ann (Nancy) married Francis B. Deane of Cartersville, and established what would be the family graveyard in Cartersville at "the Deanery." This man also had a closer cousin John Woodson (descended from burgess John Woodson's brother Robert) who lived in Albemarle County, had married Elizabeth Baily and whose son Tarleton Woodson was a sergeant in the Revolutionary War and married Annis Shepherd.

Either this man or his father was a member of Cumberland County's Committee of Safety in 1775, presided by wealthy neighbor George Carrington. Others among the 18 members included Edward Carrington (who would be one of the county's military heroes in the conflict), Joseph Carrington (soon appointed as another militia captain), Charles Woodson Jr. (who would be another military heroand represented Prince Edward County in the House of Delegates in 1811) and Carter Henry Harrison I. His nephew Blake Woodson would represent Cumberland County in the House of Delegates in 1807, but may be more notable for joining with John Randolph of Roanoke, this man's legal and legislative colleague Creed Taylor and several other men to acquire land from Judith Randolph of Bizarre plantation as the founding trustees of Farmville, the county seat of Prince Edward County and now the nearest commercial center for Cumberland County.

Cumberland County voters elected this John Woodson as one of the men representing them in the Virginia House of Delegates in 1788 alongside attorney (and future state senator and judge) Creed Taylor, and thrice re-elected Woodson (first with William Macon, then alongside John Holcombe). While this Woodson represented Cumberland County, his distant cousin Tarlton Woodson (descended from the emigrant John Woodson's son, grandson and great-grandson also named John Woodson, although his father was Charles Woodson and his grandfather was another Tarlton Woodson) represented nearby Prince Edward County, first alongside former Virginia governor Patrick Henry, and then alongside John Purnell This man's son-in-law Joseph Michaux represented Cumberland County alongside Thomas H. Drew in the Virginia Ratifying Convention of 1788. In that assembly, both men followed the lead of neighbors Patrick Henry and Thomas Read of neighboring Charlotte County and John Pride and Edmund Booker of Amelia County and voted against ratification. However, unlike Henry, Read, Pride and Booker, neither of those two Cumberland men ever held any other state elective office.

== Death and legacy ==
Woodson wrote his last will and testament in 1819, which was admitted to probate on October 22, 1821. According to the Richmond Enquirer of October 5, 1821, Woodson had died on September 24, 1821, aged 77. Tombstones of three generations of men named John Woodson are at The Deanery, a historic house within the Cartersville Historic District.
