= Rowe (surname) =

Rowe is a surname; it has also been used as the name for several places. It is of Norman origin, Rous or Le Roux', from the French rouge "red." It has strong links to northern France and Cornwall, where it remains a common surname to this day. It first appeared in England in 1066 after the Norman Invasion, when lands were granted by the first Norman King William I to Turchil Le Roux and Alan Rufus.

== A–K ==
- Absalom P. Rowe (1817–1900), American politician from Virginia
- Alan Rowe, people of the same name:
  - Alan Rowe (1891–1968), British archaeologist
  - Alan Rowe (1926–2000), New Zealand-born English actor
- Albert Rowe (politician) (1872–1955), Australian politician
- Albert Percival Rowe (1898–1976), British physicist and radar pioneer
- Alex Rowe (born 1966), British member of the French Foreign Legion
- Alfred Rowe (1837–1921), English clergyman, educationalist and cricketer
- Andrew Rowe (1935–2008), British politician
- Anthony Rowe (1640s–1704), English politician, MP for Penryn, Mitchell and Stockbridge
- Antony Rowe (1924–2003), English rower also known as Tony Rowe
- Arthur Rowe, people of the same name:
  - Arthur Rowe (footballer) (1906–1993), English footballer
  - Arthur Rowe (1936–2003), English shot putter
- Bernard Rowe (1904–1986), English freestyle wrestler
- Brad Rowe (born 1970), American film and television actor
- Charles Rowe, people of the same name:
  - Charles Rowe (born 1951), British cricketer
  - Charles Henry Rowe (1893–1943), Irish mathematician
- Christopher Rowe, people of the same name:
  - Christopher Rowe (1944–2025), British classical scholar
  - Christopher Rowe (born 1969), American author
  - Christopher Rowe, American record producer
- Clive Rowe (born 1964), British actor
- Colin Davies Rowe (1911–1970) lawyer and politician in South Australia
- Curtis Rowe (born 1949), American basketball player
- Danielle Rowe (born 1982), Australian ballet dancer
- Dave Rowe (1854–1930), American baseball player
- Deborah Jeanne Rowe (born 1958), ex-wife of pop singer Michael Jackson
- Delaney Rowe (born 1994 or 1995), American actress and influencer
- Dick Rowe (1921–1986), British music executive and producer
- Dorothy Rowe (1930–2019), Australian psychologist and author
- Doug Rowe (footballer) (1909–1978), English footballer with Luton Town, Lincoln City and Southampton
- Elizabeth Rowe, people of the same name:
  - Elizabeth Rowe (born 1974), American flutist
  - Elizabeth Singer Rowe (1674–1737), English poet
- Emile Smith Rowe (born 2000), English footballer
- F. J. Rowe (1844–1909), Professor of English Literature at the Presidency College in Calcutta, India
- Franklin Rowe, American fashion designer
- G. Steven Rowe (born 1953), American politician commonly known as Steve Rowe
- Genevieve Rowe, (1908–1995) American singer
- George Rowe (1894–1975), American character actor
- George Robert Rowe (1792–1861), English physician
- Gordon Rowe (1915–1995), New Zealand cricketer
- H. M. Rowe (1860–1926), American businessman and educator
- Hahn Rowe, US musician
- Hansford Rowe, people of the same name:
  - Hansford Rowe (1924–2017), American actor
  - Hansford Rowe, American bass guitarist
- Harris Rowe (1923–2013), American politician, lawyer, and businessman
- Henrietta Gould Rowe (1834/35–1910), American litterateur and author
- Henry Rowe (died 1612), Lord Mayor of London
- Ira DeCordova Rowe (1928–2004), Jamaican jurist
- Jack Rowe (1856–1911), American baseball player
- Jackson Rowe (born 1997), Canadian basketball player
- James N. Rowe (1938–1989), American military officer also known as Nick Rowe
- Jason Rowe (born 1969), British pop/soul singer
- Jessica Rowe (born 1970), Australian TV presenter
- John Rowe, people of the same name:
  - John Rowe (1715–1787), British American property developer and merchant
  - John Howland Rowe (1918–2004), American archaeologist and anthropologist
- Joshua Brooking Rowe (1837–1908), English antiquarian and naturalist
- Keith Rowe (born 1940), British musician and artist
- Kenneth H. Rowe, anglicized name of North Korean aviator and defector No Kum-sok (1932–2022)
- Kurtis Rowe (born 1993), New Zealand rugby league player

== L–W ==
- Lawrence Rowe (born 1949), West Indian cricketer
- Leo Stanton Rowe (1871–1946), American public official
- Len Rowe (1938–2009), English teacher and sportsman
- Luke Rowe (born 1990), racing cyclist
- Malcolm Rowe (born 1953), Canadian supreme court justice
- Marisa Rowe (born 1963), Australian basketball player
- Matthew Rowe (cyclist) (born 1988), racing cyclist
- Michael Rowe/Mike Rowe, people of the same name:
  - Michael Rowe (screenwriter) (born 1960), American television writer for Futurama
  - Michael Rowe (born 1970), Australian film director based in Mexico
  - Michael Rowe (born 1962), Canadian author and journalist
  - Mike Rowe (born 1962), American television host and narrator
  - Mike Rowe (born 1965), Canadian retired professional ice hockey player
  - Mike Rowe, American stock car racing driver
  - Mike Rowe, defendant in the case of Microsoft vs. MikeRoweSoft
  - Mike Rowe, keyboard player in Oasis and Noel Gallagher's High Flying Birds
- Misty Rowe (born 1952), actress on Hee Haw
- Neil Rowe, Barbadian politician
- Nicholas Rowe, people of the same name:
  - Nicholas Rowe (1674–1718), English dramatist, poet and miscellaneous writer
  - Nicholas Rowe (born 1966), Scottish actor
- Noel Rowe (1951–2007), Australian poet
- Normie Rowe (born 1947), Australian musician
- Patricia "Pat" Rowe (born 1939), Australian basketball player and captain
- Patrick Rowe (born 1969), American football player
- R. Kerry Rowe (born 1951), Canadian civil engineer
- Raymond Rowe (born 1984), American professional wrestler
- Richard Yates Rowe (1888–1973), American politician and businessman
- Robert Rowe (born 1938), American attorney and Republican member of the Pennsylvania House of Representatives
- Russell Rowe (1914–1994), Canadian politician
- Schoolboy Rowe (1910–1961), American baseball player
- Sedrick Rowe, American farmer
- Solána Rowe (born 1989), American singer known professionally as SZA
- Tom Rowe, people of the same name:
  - Tom Rowe (1950–2004), singer and bass player
  - Tom Rowe (born 1956), retired hockey player and coach
- Tracy-Ann Rowe (born 1985), Jamaican sprinter
- Vernon Rowe, people of the same name:
  - Vern Rowe (1896–1929), Australian rules footballer
  - Vern Rowe (1921–1981), American actor, known for The Shaggy D.A.
- Wallace P. Rowe (1926–1983), American virologist and cancer researcher
- William Rowe, people of the same name:
  - William Earl Rowe (1894–1984), Canadian politician and 20th Lieutenant Governor of Ontario
  - William L. Rowe (1931–2015), American professor and philosopher of religion
  - William Rowe (died 1593), Lord Mayor of London

== See also ==
- Roe (surname)
