= Maurice B. Rowe III =

American civil servant (1922–2014)

1st & 3rd Virginia Secretary of Commerce
- In office January 14, 1978 – January 16, 1982
- Governor: John N. Dalton
- Preceded by: Earl J. Shiflet
- Succeeded by: Betty Jane Diener
- In office July 1, 1972 – January 12, 1974
- Governor: Linwood Holton
- Preceded by: Position created
- Succeeded by: Earl J. Shiflet

2nd Virginia Secretary of Administration
- In office January 12, 1974 – January 14, 1978
- Governor: Mills Godwin
- Preceded by: T. Edward Temple
- Succeeded by: Charles Walker

Personal details
- Born: Maurice Broaddus Rowe III; October 4, 1922 Fredericksburg, Virginia, U.S.
- Died: November 26, 2014 (aged 92) Richmond, Virginia, U.S.
- Resting place: Westhampton Memorial Park; Richmond, Virginia, U.S.
- Spouse: Joyce McKissick (m. 1952)
- Relations: Maurice B. Rowe (grandfather); Absalom P. Rowe (great-grandfather)
- Children: 2
- Education: Virginia Tech (BS)

Military service
- Allegiance: United States
- Branch/service: United States Army
- Years of service: 1943–1946
- Battles/wars: World War II

Maurice Broaddus Rowe III (October 4, 1922 – November 26, 2014) was an American civil servant who served multiple senior roles in Virginia's state government. In 1972, Governor Linwood Holton appointed him the Commonwealth's first Secretary of Commerce and Resources after serving the previous seven years as Commissioner of the Virginia Department of Agriculture and Consumer Services.

== Early life ==
Maurice Broaddus Rowe III was born in Fredericksburg, Virginia, to Dorothy and Maurice B. Rowe Jr. His great-grandfather was Absalom P. Rowe and his grandfather was Maurice B. Rowe. He spent his early years at his family's dairy and livestock farm at Brompton. He graduated from James Monroe High School in 1941. He attended Virginia Tech and participated in the Cadet Corps there until 1943 when he entered military service. After World War II, he returned and graduated from Virginia Tech in 1948 with a Bachelor of Science degree in agricultural education.

== Career ==
Rowe served in the Fifth Infantry Division of the Third Army. He served from 1943 to 1946 in the European theater. He received various commendations for his service.

After graduating, in 1948, Rowe joined the Virginia Department of Agriculture and Commerce. He served in a number of roles before being appointed as commissioner by Governor Albertis Harrison in 1965. He was later appointed to the governor's cabinet in 1972 as the first Secretary of Commerce and Resources. He served in the cabinet of three Virginia governors, Holton, Godwin and Dalton. He retired in 1983.

In 1966, Rowe became a member of the Kiwanis Club of Richmond. He served as its president from 1975 to 1976. He served on the Keep Virginia Beautiful board of directors in the late 1960s and was president of the board from 1994 to 2009. He was a member of the State Fair of Virginia board of directors for several decades. He served as its chairman at one point.

== Personal life ==
Rowe married Joyce McKissick, daughter of Andrew McKissick, of Blackstone, Virginia, in November 1952. They had two children, Caroline and Maurice B. IV. He was a member of Forest Hill Presbyterian Church and became an elder in 1964. He lived in Richmond.

Rowe died on November 26, 2014. He was buried at Westhampton Memorial Park in Richmond.

== Awards ==
Rowe received the Public Business Administrator of the Year from the Virginia Chapter, American Society of Public Business Administrators in 1974.

Political offices
Preceded by T. Edward Temple	Virginia Secretary of Administration; 1974–1978	Succeeded by Charles Walker
Preceded by None	Virginia Secretary of Commerce; 1972–1974; 1978–1982	Succeeded by Earl J. Shiflet
Preceded by Earl J. Shiflet	Virginia Secretary of Commerce; 1972–1974; 1978–1982	Succeeded by Betty Jane Diener
