= Roee =

Roee or Roei (Hebrew: רועי) is a Hebrew male given name meaning "shepherd". Sometimes anglicised as Roy. Notable people with the name include:

- Roee Avraham (born 1996), Israeli squash player
- Roy Schwartz Tichon (born 1992), social entrepreneur promoting public transportation on Saturday in Israel
- Roy Nachum (born 1979), Israeli contemporary artist
- Roee Rosen (born 1963), Israeli artist

== See also ==
- Roe (surname)
