= John Lawrence Marye Jr. =

American politician

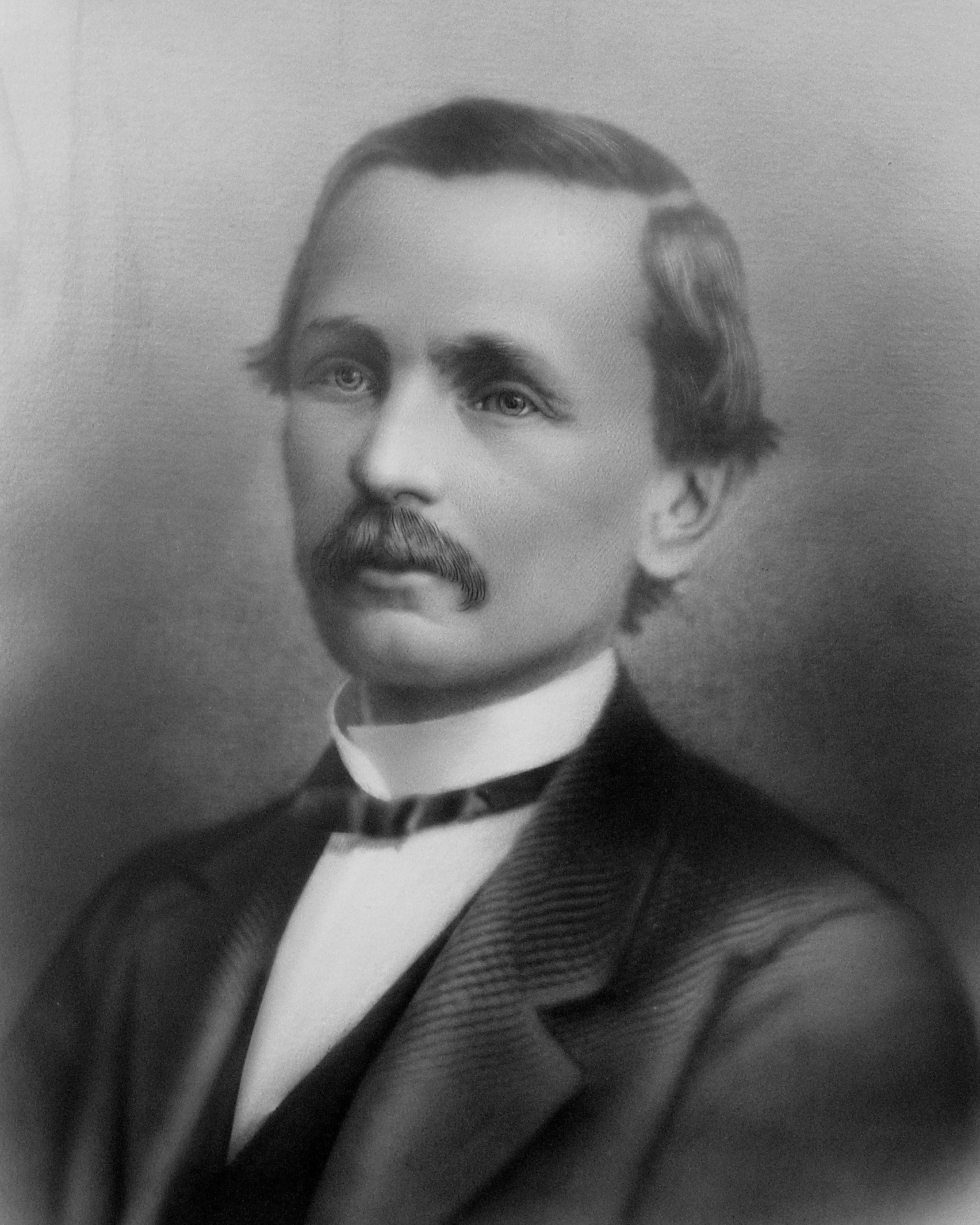

10th Lieutenant Governor of Virginia
- In office January 1, 1870 – January 1, 1874
- Governor: Gilbert Carlton Walker
- Preceded by: John F. Lewis
- Succeeded by: Robert E. Withers

Member of the Virginia House of Delegates from the Spotsylvania County district
- In office January 7, 1863 – January 9, 1868
- Preceded by: Douglas H. Gordon
- Succeeded by: C. Herndon

Personal details
- Born: November 4, 1823 Fredericksburg, Virginia, U.S.
- Died: August 2, 1902 (aged 78) Fredericksburg, Virginia, U.S.
- Party: Conservative
- Spouse: Mildred Browne (m.1846)
- Children: 6
- Education: University of Virginia

John Lawrence Marye Jr. (November 4, 1823 – September 2, 1902), was a Virginia lawyer, plantation owner, Confederate soldier and politician. He served in the Virginia House of Delegates during the American Civil War, and upon the legislature's election of Lt. Gov. John F. Lewis as one of Virginia's U.S. Senators following the Commonwealth's readmission to the Union, was elected the tenth Lieutenant Governor of Virginia (1870-1874) and as such presided over the Virginia Senate. Marye also represented Spotsylvania County in both the Virginia Secession Convention and the Virginia Constitutional Convention of 1868, when he was a leading opponent of Congressional Reconstruction.

== Early and family life ==
This John L. Marye was born on November 4, 1823, in Spotsylvania County, Virginia to Anna Maria Burton and her husband John L. Marye Sr., a prominent lawyer in Spotsylvania County and the nearest city and port, Fredericksburg. Marye was educated in private schools in Fredericksburg.

He married Mildred ("Milly") S. Browne, daughter of a prominent physician, in Fredericksburg on October 29, 1846, and they had six children.

== Career ==
Marye served as Fredericksburg's mayor from February 12, 1853 until March 21, 1854. He operated a farm in Spotsylvania County near St. Georges, and he or his father owned 10 enslaved people in 1850, and at least two slaves in 1860.

Spotsylvania County voters elected the junior Marye as one of their delegates to the Virginia Secession Convention in 1861. A conditional Unionist, he at first voted against secession, then after the militia call up by Abraham Lincoln to restore Federal property in the South, Marye voted for secession.

During the American Civil War, Marye volunteered for the Confederate army shortly after Virginia's secession, first serving as a private in Pollock's Company (a/k/a Fredericksburg Light Artillery). Despite his relatively advanced age, J.L. Marye Jr. rose to the rank of sergeant before his discharge. Although this light artillery company was originally designated to protect its local area (Aquia and Stafford north of Fredericksburg), it began to see more action in the Battle of Williamsburg in May 1862. By mid-1862, Fredericksburg itself became contested, and the Washington Artillery of New Orleans quartered on the Marye estate in Fredericksburg (Brompton) during the fierce fighting in the Battle of Fredericksburg in mid-December 1862, although it was captured during the Second Battle of Fredericksburg so that the next year it would become a hospital for injured Union soldiers.

After Spotsylvania's previous delegate resigned, Marye took his place and served in the House of Delegates from Spotsylvania in the January session of 1863, then for the sessions 1863/64 and 1864/65.

In 1867, Marye was elected to the Virginia Constitutional Convention of 1868. He was one of three delegates elected from the central Piedmont constitutional convention district consisting of Spotsyvania County, as well as neighboring rural Caroline and King George Counties.

Marye was one of the Committee of Nine negotiating for the enfranchisement of former Confederates during Virginia's Reconstruction. His father died in 1868, without a will, so the court-appointed executors repaired the mansion (Matthew Brady photographed its postwar condition) and sold it in 1873 to John G. Lane, whose widow would sell it to the Rowe family in 1887 (still during this Marye's lifetime).

After Virginia adopted the 1868 Constitution despite the objections of conservatives (and voters' rejection of provisions which would have denied voting and officeholding to former Confederates), Marye successfully campaigned to become Lieutenant Governor of Virginia. He served from January 1, 1870 until January 1, 1874, and the position also made him President of the Virginia Senate.

Marye also served on the board of visitors of the University of Virginia after the war, including as the board's rector. Although his great, great grandfather James Marye had emigrated to Virginia in 1726 and long served as rector of Fredericksburg's St. George's Episcopal Church, J.L.Marye Jr. was active in the Frederickburg's Presbyterian Church, becoming an elder in 1854. He served as a delegate to the General Assemblies of the Presbyterian Church in 1866, 1874, 1875 and 1877, and in 1880, Marye was a delegate to the Presbyterian Alliance in Philadelphia, Pennsylvania.

== Death and legacy ==
Marye died on September 2, 1902, and was buried in the Fredericksburg City Cemetery.

The Fredericksburg mansion his father built circa 1838 and expanded (once known as the Marye Manion and now as Brompton), still exists, was listed on the National Register of Historic Places in 1979, and is serves as the residence of the President of University of Mary Washington.

== See also ==
- List of mayors of Fredericksburg, Virginia

== Bibliography ==
- "How Virginia Convention delegates voted on secession, April 4 and April 17…" (PDF). Union or Secession. Library of Virginia.
- Pulliam, David Loyd (1901). The Constitutional Conventions of Virginia from the foundation of the Commonwealth to the present time. John T. West, Richmond. ISBN 978-1-2879-2059-5.
- Swem, Earl Greg (1918). A Register of the General Assembly of Virginia, 1776-1918, and of the Constitutional Conventions. David Bottom, Superintendent of Public Printing. ISBN 978-1-3714-6242-0.

Political offices
Preceded by John F. Lewis	Lieutenant Governor of Virginia; 1870–1874	Succeeded by Robert E. Withers
