= Maurice B. Rowe =

American politician (1850–1925)

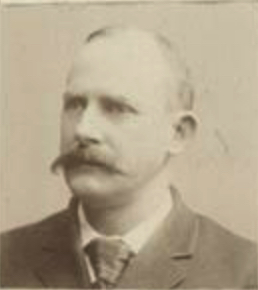
- Portrait of Rowe, c. 1891

Member of the Virginia House of Delegates for Spotsylvania and Fredericksburg
- In office December 4, 1889 – December 6, 1893
- Preceded by: H. F. Crismond
- Succeeded by: Solon T. Coleman

Personal details
- Born: Maurice Broaddus Rowe; February 27, 1850 Fredericksburg, Virginia, U.S.
- Died: March 25, 1925 (aged 75) Fredericksburg, Virginia, U.S.
- Resting place: Fredericksburg City Cemetery
- Party: Democratic
- Spouse: Cora Motley (m. 1876)
- Children: 14
- Parent: Absalom P. Rowe (father)
- Relatives: Maurice B. Rowe III (grandson)
- Occupation: Politician; breeder

Maurice Broaddus Rowe (February 27, 1850 – March 25, 1925) was an American politician from Virginia. He served in the Virginia House of Delegates.

== Early life ==
Maurice Broaddus Rowe was born on February 27, 1850, in Fredericksburg, Virginia, to Almeda F. and Absalom P. Rowe. He attended public schools until 1865 and then served with his father in the quartermaster's department of the Confederate States Army in the last year of the Civil War.

== Career ==
Rowe worked with his father in raising stock at the farm at Brompton. He was president of the Planters' National Bank. He also served as vice president of the Farmers' Creamery Company. He bred Jersey cattle, owned extensive farm land and had a general store in Fredericksburg.

Rowe served as a captain in Company K of the 3rd Virginia Infantry Regiment during the Spanish-American War. He was a Democrat. He served as a member of the Virginia House of Delegates, representing Spotsylvania County and was a member of the Fredericksburg City Council for 12 years.

== Personal life ==
Rowe married Cora Motley, daughter of John L. Motley, on June 15, 1876, in Caroline County. They had 14 children, including Peyton, Lena, Mary D., Leland, Cora and Maurice. His grandson Maurice B. Rowe III was the Virginia Secretary of Commerce and Resources.

Rowe died on March 25, 1925, at his home in Brompton, Fredericksburg. He was buried at Fredericksburg City Cemetery.

== Legacy ==
M. B. Rowe Camp of the Spanish-American War veterans was named after Rowe.
