= Anthony Rowe =

Anthony Rowe or Antony Rowe may refer to:

- Antony Rowe (1924–2003), or Tony Rowe, English rower
- Anthony Rowe (MP) (1640s–1704), English politician, MP for Penryn, Mitchell and Stockbridge
- Anthony Rowe (basketball) (fl 2012), former player for the Plymouth Raiders

== See also ==
- Rowe (surname)
