= John F. Lewis =

American politician (1818–1895)

John Francis Lewis
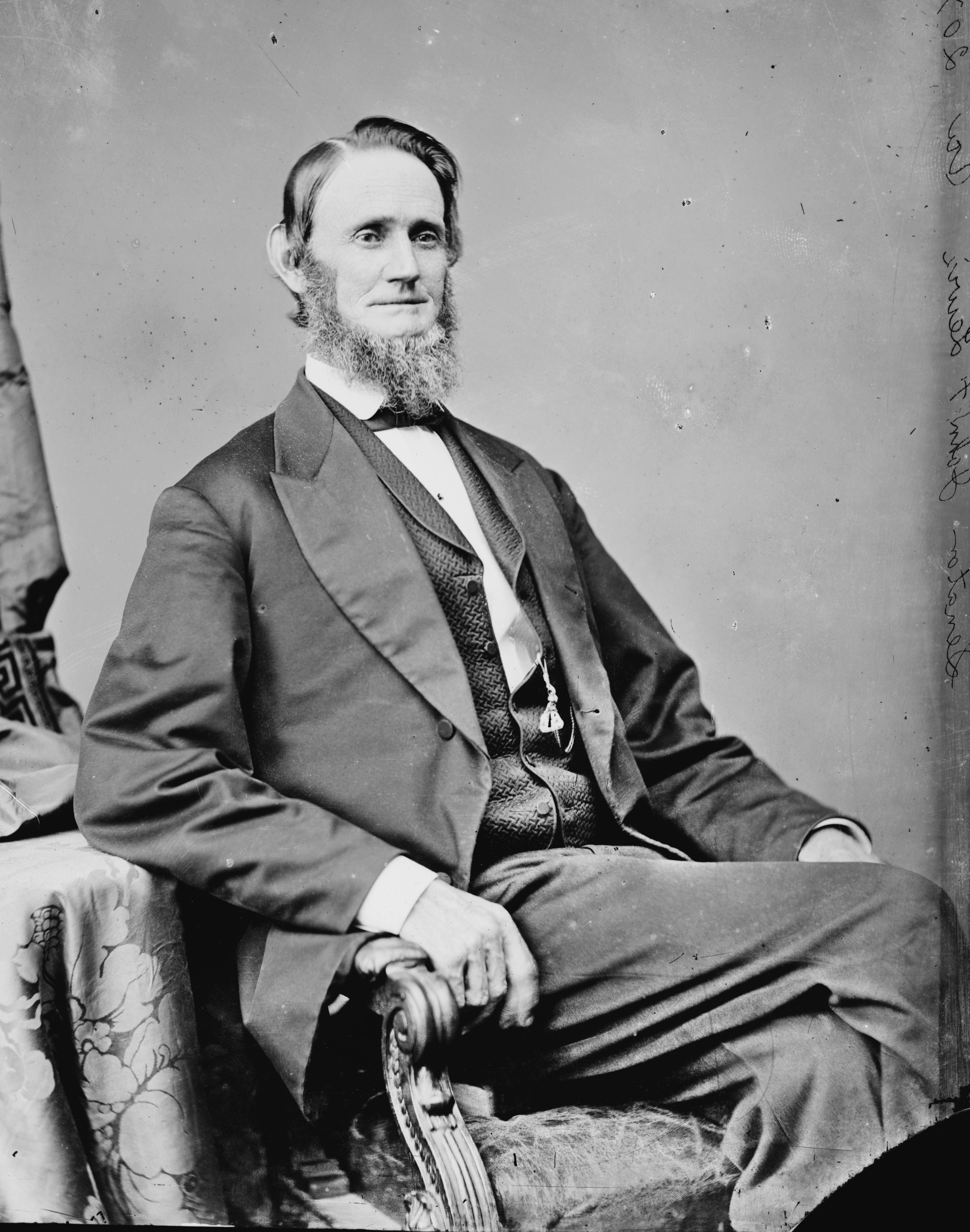
- Portrait, 1860–1875

9th and 14th Lieutenant Governor of Virginia
- In office January 1, 1882 – January 1, 1886
- Governor: William E. Cameron
- Preceded by: James A. Walker
- Succeeded by: John E. Massey
- In office October 5, 1869 – January 1, 1870
- Governor: Gilbert Carlton Walker
- Preceded by: Leopold C. P. Cowper
- Succeeded by: John Lawrence Marye, Jr.

United States Senator from Virginia
- In office January 26, 1870 – March 3, 1875
- Preceded by: Lemuel J. Bowden
- Succeeded by: Robert E. Withers

Personal details
- Born: March 1, 1818 Lynnwood, Virginia, US
- Died: September 2, 1895 (aged 77) Lynnwood, Virginia, US
- Party: Republican
- Spouse: Serena Helen Sheffey (m.1842)
- Children: 6

John Francis Lewis (March 1, 1818 – September 2, 1895) was an American planter and politician from Rockingham County, Virginia. He represented Rockingham County as a Whig during the Virginia Secession Convention of 1861 and refused to sign the final document, and twice served as Lieutenant Governor of Virginia following the American Civil War and represented Virginia as a Republican in the United States Senate during the Reconstruction period after the Civil War.

== Early and family life ==
John F. Lewis was born on the "Lynnwood" plantation in rural Rockingham County, Virginia, a son of Samuel Hance Lewis and Nancy Cameron Lewis. He attended a private school and farmed as a young man. He owned one 25 year old enslaved mulatto woman in 1850. He (or more likely another John Lewis who married a woman named Amanda in Rockingham District 1) owned 8 slaves in 1860.

Lewis married Serena Helen Sheffey (1823–1901) in October 1842, and they raised two sons and four daughters. Daniel Sheffey Lewis (1843-1912) became a newspaperman as well as served for many years as treasurer of the city of Harrisonburg, and became one of the state's most prominent Republicans. His brother John Francis Lewis Jr. (1860-1915), survived him but committed suicide after suffering a stroke and learning he would not heal completely.

== Career ==
He was a delegate to the Virginia secession convention in 1861, but refused to sign the ordinance of secession. He was the only member from east of the Allegheny Mountains that refused to endorse the document.

During the Civil War, portions of the Battle of Port Republic were fought on his family's land.

Lewis was an unsuccessful Union Party candidate for Congress in 1865. He was elected as Virginia's lieutenant governor in 1869 and served from October 5 of that year until January 1, 1870. Upon the readmission of Virginia to representation in the U.S. Congress, Lewis was elected as a Republican to the United States Senate and served from January 26, 1870, to March 3, 1875. He served on the Committee on the District of Columbia in the Forty-third Congress. He was not a candidate for reelection as the Republicans had already become a minority party by 1874 and wouldn't control either house on their own in Virginia for the rest of the 19th century.

He returned home and was appointed by Presidents Ulysses S. Grant and Rutherford B. Hayes as the United States Marshal for the western district of Virginia 1875–1882, when he resigned. Lewis was again elected lieutenant governor in 1881, alongside Readjuster Party candidate William E. Cameron, and served with him from 1882 to 1886. After his term, no Republican served as Virginia's lieutenant governor until John N. Dalton served from 1974 to 1978.

He retired from politics after his term and resumed farming.

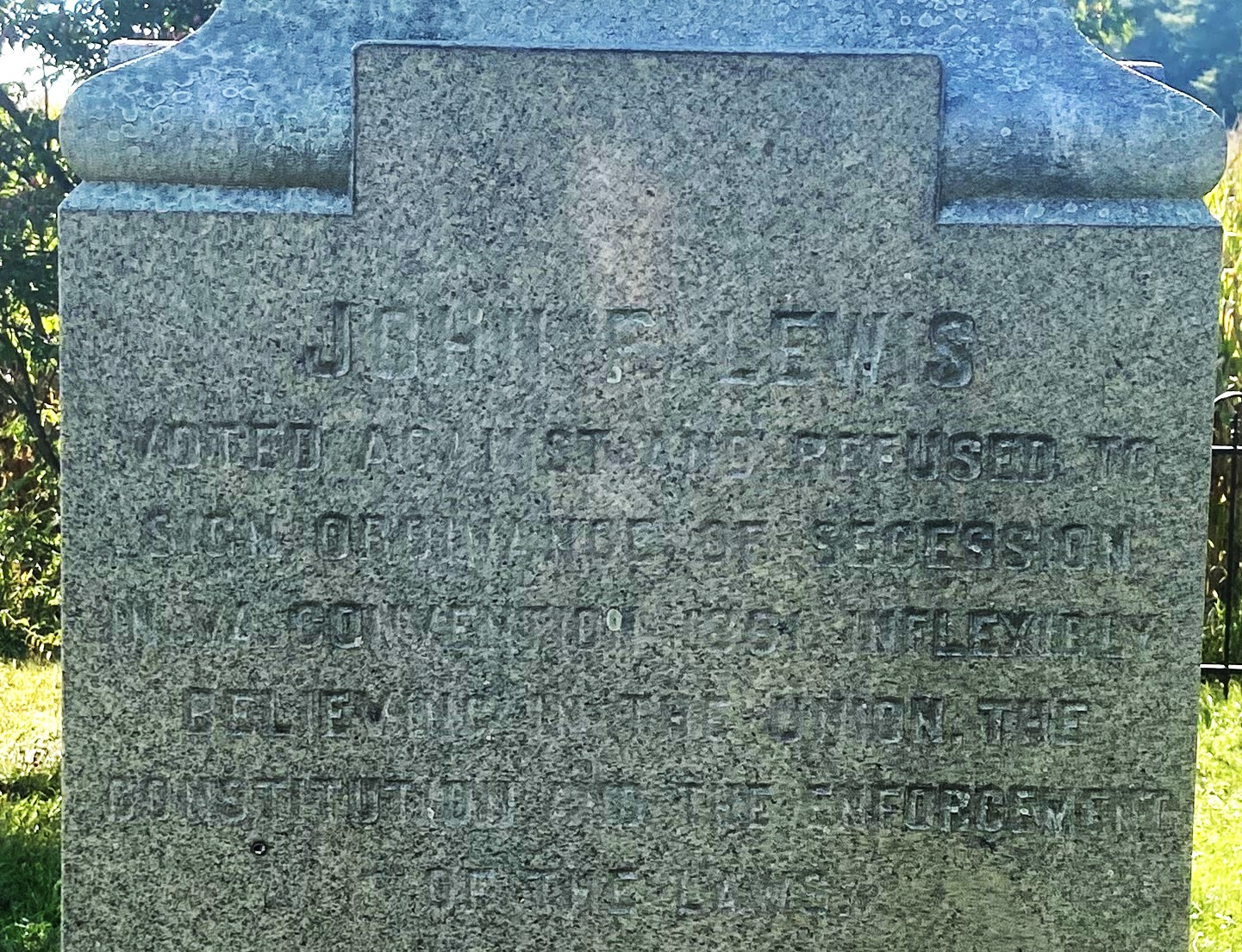
Inscription on the John F. Lewis monument at the Lewis Family cemetery

== Death and legacy ==
Lewis died at Lynnwood in Rockingham County, Virginia. He was buried in the family burial ground on the plantation.

Political offices
Preceded by Leopold C. P. Cowper	Lieutenant Governor of Virginia; 1869–1870	Succeeded by John L. Marye, Jr.
Preceded by James A. Walker	Lieutenant Governor of Virginia; 1882–1886	Succeeded by J. E. "Parson" Massey
U.S. Senate
Preceded by Lemuel J. Bowden	U.S. senator (Class 1) from Virginia; January 26, 1870 – March 3, 1875; Served alongside: John W. Johnston	Succeeded by Robert E. Withers
