= Robert E. Withers =

American politician (1821–1907)

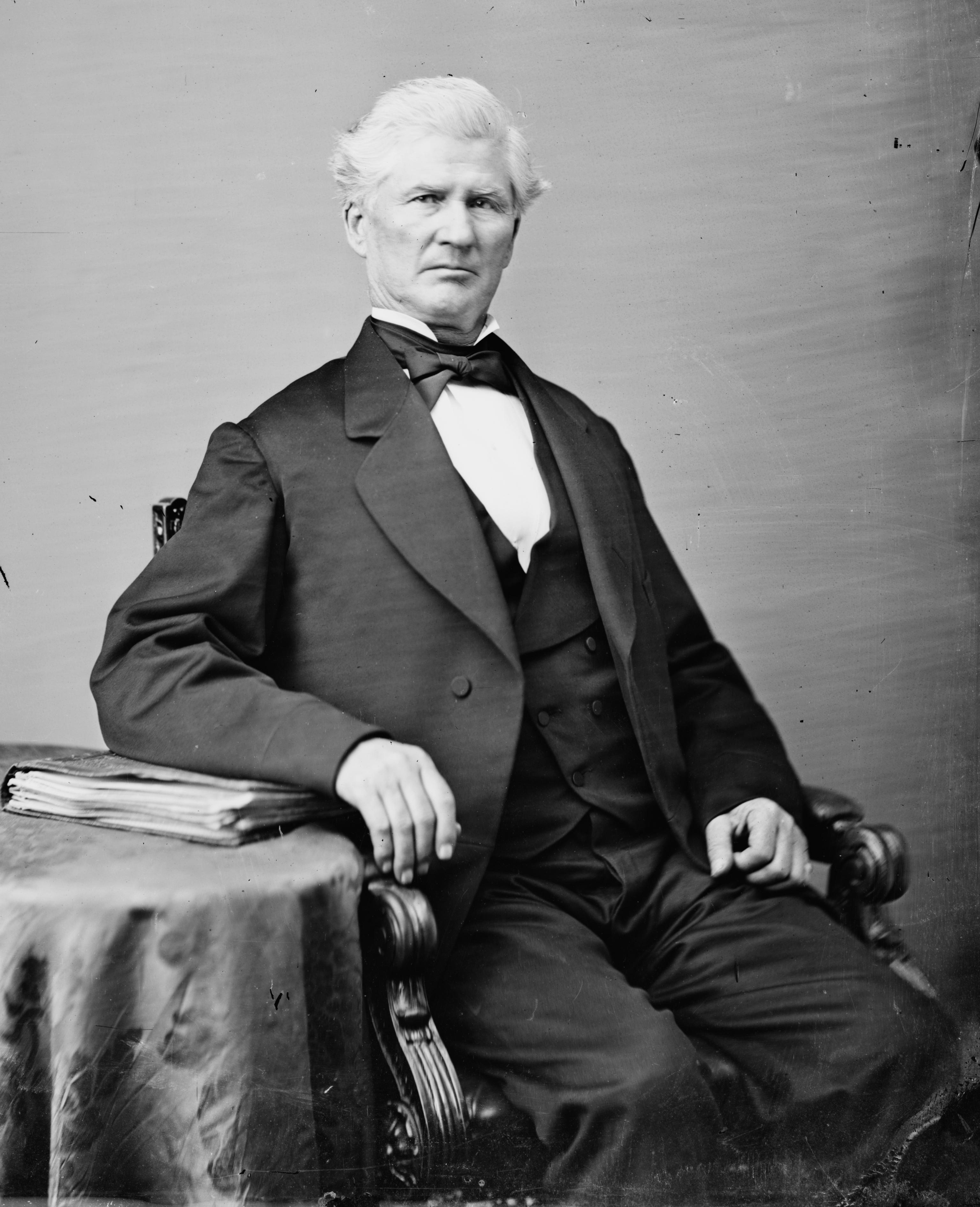
- Portrait, 1860–1875

United States Senator from Virginia
- In office March 4, 1875 – March 3, 1881
- Preceded by: John F. Lewis
- Succeeded by: William Mahone

11th Lieutenant Governor of Virginia
- In office January 1, 1874 – March 1, 1875
- Governor: James L. Kemper
- Preceded by: John L. Marye, Jr.
- Succeeded by: Henry W. Thomas

Personal details
- Born: Robert Enoch Withers; September 18, 1821 Lynchburg, Virginia, U.S.
- Died: September 21, 1907 (aged 86) Wytheville, Virginia, U.S.
- Party: Democratic
- Spouse: Mary Virginia Royall (m.1846)
- Children: 8
- Education: University of Virginia

Military service
- Allegiance: Confederate States of America
- Branch/service: Confederate States Army
- Years of service: 1861–1865
- Rank: Colonel
- Battles/wars: American Civil War

Robert Enoch Withers (September 18, 1821 – September 21, 1907) was an American physician, Confederate military officer, newspaperman, politician, diplomat, and Freemason. He served as Lieutenant Governor of Virginia and represented Virginia in the United States Senate and served as U.S. Consul in Hong Kong.

== Early life ==
Withers was born near Lynchburg, Virginia to Dr. Robert Walter Withers and Susan Dabney Alexander. He was the second child and oldest son of 11 children.

Withers attended private schools and then graduated from the medical department of the University of Virginia in 1841. He commenced practice in Campbell County. In 1858 he moved to Danville, Virginia. While studying at university, Withers was inducted into the Freemasons, an organization he would remain with for life, specifically as a leader in the Knights Templar (Freemasonry).

== Military Service ==
During the American Civil War, he entered the Confederate States Army in early 1861 as the major of the 18th Virginia Infantry Regiment. He was subsequently promoted to colonel of the regiment, which he commanded until he retired. Withers sustained wounds incurred while leading a charge at the Battle of Gaines' Mill. Withers then oversaw the Confederate prison post at Danville, a complex of six former tobacco warehouses, which housed up to 5,000 Union prisoners of war. He held this administrative position until the Confederacy surrendered.

Withers is largely responsible for preventing destruction of Danville's infrastructure (bridges, rails) by Confederates forces toward the end of the war. He was Provost Marshall of the city until the arrival of Federal troops.

== Political Life and Government Service ==
Following the war, Withers moved back to Lynchburg in 1866 and established the Lynchburg News, a daily paper devoted to the interests of the Conservative Party. He was nominated for Governor of Virginia by that party but withdrew from the race.

Withers was a presidential elector on the Democratic ticket in 1872. He was elected the 11th Lieutenant Governor of Virginia in 1873.

Withers was elected as a Democrat to the United States Senate, representing President Grover Cleveland’s classically liberal, ”Bourbon” wing of the party, serving from March 4, 1875, to March 3, 1881. He chaired the Committee on Pensions in the 46th Congress. Withers lost reelection in 1881 to William Mahone of the Readjuster Party.

In 1877 Withers was appointed to the Board of Regents of the Smithsonian Institution.

President Grover Cleveland appointed Withers as the United States consul to British Hong Kong, from 1885–89, when he resigned. He returned to the United States and retired to Wytheville, Virginia.

== Legacy and Death ==
Withers wrote his autobiography, Memoirs of an Octogenarian during his retirement. His extensive collection of personal papers are housed with the Kegley Library of Wytheville Community College.

Withers died at the "Ingleside" plantation in Wytheville on September 21, 1907. He was buried in the East End Cemetery in Wytheville.

In 1846 Withers married Mary Virginia Royall, with whom he had eight children, one of whom, Betty Ellison Withers Putney, was an advocate for women's suffrage in the early 20th Century.

Withers' grand nephew Withers A. Burress was a commandant of Virginia Military Institute and served as a combat commander in both World War I and World War II. He was also a cousin to Thomas W. Chinn, Member of the United States House of Representatives from Louisiana and the US Minister to the Kingdom of the Two Sicilies.

Withers was a distant relative of figures such as George Washington and Robert E. Lee, as well as a direct descendant of Nicolas Martiau, founder of Yorktown, Virginia.

Political offices
Preceded by John L. Marye, Jr.	Lieutenant Governor of Virginia; 1874–1875	Succeeded by Henry W. Thomas
U.S. Senate
Preceded by John F. Lewis	U.S. senator (Class 1) from Virginia; March 4, 1875 – March 3, 1881; Served alongside: John W. Johnston	Succeeded by William Mahone
Diplomatic posts
Preceded by John S. Mosby	United States Consul at Hong Kong; 1885–1889	Succeeded by Oliver H. Simons
