= Lieutenant Governor of Virginia =

Constitutional officer of Virginia, US

Lieutenant Governor of the Commonwealth of Virginia
- Seal of the Commonwealth of Virginia

- Incumbent; Ghazala Hashmi since January 17, 2026
- Style: The Honorable
- Term length: Four years, no term limits
- Inaugural holder: Shelton Leake
- Formation: 1852
- Website: www.ltgov.virginia.gov/

The lieutenant governor of the Commonwealth of Virginia is a constitutional officer of the Commonwealth of Virginia. The lieutenant governor is elected every four years along with the governor and attorney general.

The office is currently held by Ghazala Hashmi, who was elected in 2025 and is the second woman and fourth person of color to hold this position. The governor and lieutenant governor are elected separately and thus may be of different political parties. The lieutenant governor serves as the president of the Senate of Virginia and is first in the line of succession to the governorship; if the governor dies, resigns, or otherwise leaves office, the lieutenant governor becomes governor. In Virginia, the governor is not permitted to serve consecutive terms, but the lieutenant governor may do so, and has no term limit.

== History ==
Beginning in the 1630s, the British Crown appointed several officials to aide the governors of the Colony of Virginia in the execution of their duties, collectively known as the Governor's Council or the Council of State. One member of this body was designated as the governor's deputy, or lieutenant governor, and exercised the governor's authority when they were absent. The Virginia Constitution of 1776 abolished the council.

The Virginia Constitution of 1851 created the modern office of the lieutenant governor. It provided for the popular election of the officer and designated them ex officio president of the Virginia Senate. In this capacity they replaced the Speaker of the Senate, which had been chosen by the body's own members as their presiding officer from 1776 until 1852. During the American Civil War, Virginia had two different governments and accordingly different sets of lieutenant governors. From 1865 until 1870, the lieutenant governors were appointed by the commanding general of the First Military District. In 1870, Virginia was readmitted to the federal union and, from then on, the officers were chosen by popular election. That year, the state adopted a new constitution which gave the lieutenant governor the power to cast tie-breaking votes in the Senate.

Douglas Wilder, sworn-in in 1986, was Virginia's first black lieutenant governor. Winsome Sears, sworn in on January 15, 2022, is the first woman to have held the office.

== Election ==
Along with the governor and attorney general, the lieutenant governor is one of three popularly elected executive offices in the state of Virginia. The lieutenant governor is elected on their own ticket separate from the governor. They serve without term limits. If the governor-elect does not assume their office, the lieutenant governor-elect becomes governor.

== Powers, duties, and structure ==
Article V of the Constitution of Virginia designates the lieutenant governor as the president of the Senate. If absent, its president pro tempore serves as its presiding officer. The lieutenant governor is allowed to vote in the Senate only to break ties. While this power has been interpreted to apply to most generic legislation, it has been disputed by state officials as to whether the tie-breaking power applies to votes on matters such as constitutional amendments or on the Senate's concurrence with an executive appointment. Such questions are yet to be resolved by litigation in state courts. The constitution additionally stipulates that the lieutenant governor succeeds the governor in their office should it become vacant due to death, disqualification, or resignation. State law empowers the lieutenant governor to serve on several state boards and commissions. The lieutenant governor can be impeached and removed from office by the Virginia General Assembly.

The lieutenant governor's office is located in the Oliver Hill Building in Richmond, Virginia. Their salary is set by legislation and cannot be altered during a given term to which they were elected. As of 2021, the annual salary is $36,321. As the role is a part-time position, most incumbents—unless already wealthy or retired by the time of their tenure—have held additional occupations.

== List of elected lieutenant governors of Virginia ==
Parties

Conservative (1 lieutenant governor) Democrat (31 lieutenant governors) Independent (1 lieutenant governor) Republican (7 lieutenant governors) Union (2 lieutenant governors)

#	Image	Name	Party	Term	Governor	Notes	Source
1		Shelton Leake	Democratic	1852–1856	Joseph Johnson		
2		Elisha W. McComas	Democratic	1856–1857	Henry A. Wise		
3		William Lowther Jackson	Democratic	1857–1860	Henry A. Wise		
4		Robert Latane Montague	Democratic	1860–1864	John Letcher	Richmond (Confederate) Government	
5		Samuel Price	Democratic	1864–1865	William Smith	Richmond (Confederate) Government	
6		Daniel Polsley	Union	1861–1863	John Letcher	Restored (Unionist) Government	
7		Leopold Copeland Parker Cowper	Union	1863–1865	John Letcher	Restored (Unionist) Government	
8		Leopold Copeland Parker Cowper	Union	1865–1869	William Smith; Francis Harrison Pierpont; Henry H. Wells; Gilbert Carlton Walker		
9		John F. Lewis	Republican	1869–1870	Gilbert Carlton Walker		
10		John Lawrence Marye, Jr.	Conservative	1870–1874	Gilbert Carlton Walker		
11		Robert E. Withers	Democratic	1874–1875	James L. Kemper		
12		Henry Wirtz Thomas	Republican	1875–1878	James L. Kemper		
13		James A. Walker	Democratic	1878–1882	Frederick W. M. Holliday		
14		John F. Lewis	Republican	1882–1886	William E. Cameron		
15		John E. Massey	Democratic	1886–1890	Fitzhugh Lee		
16		James Hoge Tyler	Democratic	1890–1894	Philip W. McKinney		
17		Robert Craig Kent	Democratic	1894–1898	Charles Triplett O'Ferrall		
18		Edward Echols	Democratic	1898–1902	James H. Tyler		
19		Joseph Edward Willard	Democratic	1902–1906	Andrew J. Montague		
20		James Taylor Ellyson	Democratic	1906–1918	Claude A. Swanson; William Hodges Mann; Henry Carter Stuart		
21		Benjamin Franklin Buchanan	Democratic	1918–1922	Westmoreland Davis		
22		Junius Edgar West	Democratic	1922–1930	Elbert L. Trinkle; Harry F. Byrd		
23		James H. Price	Democratic	1930–1938	John Garland Pollard; George C. Peery		
24		Saxon Winston Holt	Democratic	1938–1940	James H. Price	died in office	
25		William M. Tuck	Democratic	1942–1946	Colgate Darden		
26		Lewis Preston Collins II	Democratic	1946–1952	William M. Tuck	died in office	
27		Allie Edward Stokes Stephens	Democratic	1952–1962	John S. Battle	filled Collins's term	
28		Mills E. Godwin, Jr.	Democratic	1962–1966	Albertis Harrison		
29		Fred G. Pollard	Democratic	1966–1970	Mills Godwin		
30		J. Sargeant Reynolds	Democratic	1970–1971	Linwood Holton	died in office	
31		Henry Howell	Independent	1971–1974	Linwood Holton	Completed Reynolds's term	
32		John N. Dalton	Republican	1974–1978	Mills Godwin		
33		Chuck Robb	Democratic	1978–1982	John N. Dalton		
34		Dick Davis	Democratic	1982–1986	Chuck Robb		
35		Douglas Wilder	Democratic	1986–1990	Gerald Baliles		
36		Don Beyer	Democratic	1990–1998	Douglas Wilder; George Allen		
37		John H. Hager	Republican	1998–2002	Jim Gilmore		
38		Tim Kaine	Democratic	2002–2006	Mark Warner		
39		Bill Bolling	Republican	2006–2014	Tim Kaine; Bob McDonnell		
40		Ralph Northam	Democratic	2014–2018	Terry McAuliffe		
41		Justin Fairfax	Democratic	2018–2022	Ralph Northam		
42		Winsome Earle-Sears	Republican	2022–2026	Glenn Youngkin		
43		Ghazala Hashmi	Democratic	2026–present	Abigail Spanberger		

== Works cited ==
- Dinan, John J. (2014). The Virginia State Constitution. Oxford University Press. ISBN 9780199355723.
