= Roe (surname) =

Roe is a surname. Notable people with the surname include:

- Alban Roe (1583–1642), English Benedictine martyr
- Alliott Verdon Roe (1877–1958), British aircraft manufacturer
- Allison Roe (born 1956), New Zealand marathon runner and politician
- Ann Roe (born 1966), Wisconsin politician
- Anna Wang Roe (born 1959), American neuroscientist
- Anne Roe (1904–1991), American clinical psychologist and researcher
- Arthur Roe (footballer) (1892–1960), English football halfback
- Arthur Roe (politician) (1878–1942), American politician and lawyer
- Arthur Stanley Roe, medical doctor from Queensland, Australia
- Brian Roe (1939–2014), English cricketer
- Charles Roe (1715–1781), English industrialist
- Charles Francis Roe (1848–1922), American military officer
- David Roe (born 1965), English snooker player
- Edward Payson Roe (1838–1888), American novelist
- Erica Roe (born 1957), Twickenham streaker
- Francis Roe (died 1620), Irish politician
- Francis Asbury Roe (1823–1901), United States Navy admiral
- Fred Roe (1864–1947) British artist
- Gloria Roe (1935–2017), American sacred music composer and performer
- James M. Roe (born 1943), American astronomer
- Jane Roe (pseudonym), a legal pseudonym similar to Jane Doe
- Jerry D. Roe (born 1936), American academic
- John B. Roe (1942–2020), American lawyer and politician
- John Septimus Roe (1797–1878), first Surveyor-General of Western Australia
- Katherine Bissell Roe (1852–1921), American clubwoman
- Kent Roe, American politician
- Kris Roe, member of The Ataris
- Marie Roe, married name of Marie Stopes
- Marion Roe (born 1936), British politician
- Marrion Roe (1935–2017), New Zealand Olympic swimmer
- Michael Roe (born 1954), American record producer
- Phil Roe (politician) (born 1945), American politician and U.S. Representative
- Phil Roe (footballer) (born 1991), English footballer
- Philip L. Roe (1938–2026), English dynamicist, professor of aerospace engineering
- Philippa Roe, Baroness Couttie (1962–2022), British politician
- Reginald Heber Roe (1850–1926), 2nd headmaster of Brisbane Grammar School, 1st vice chancellor of University of Queensland
- Richard Roe (pseudonym), a legal pseudonym similar to John Doe
- Robert A. Roe (1924–2014), member of the U.S. House of Representatives
- Theodore Roe, African-American organized crime figure.
- Thomas Roe (c. 1581–1644), English diplomat
- Tim Roe (born 1989), Australian cyclist
- Tommy Roe (born 1942), American pop music singer and songwriter
- William Gordon Roe (1932–1999), Bishop of Huntingdon

== See also ==
- Rowe (surname)
