= List of mayors of Fredericksburg, Virginia =

Mayors of the city of Fredericksburg, Virginia, USA

The following is a list of mayors of the city of Fredericksburg, Virginia, USA.

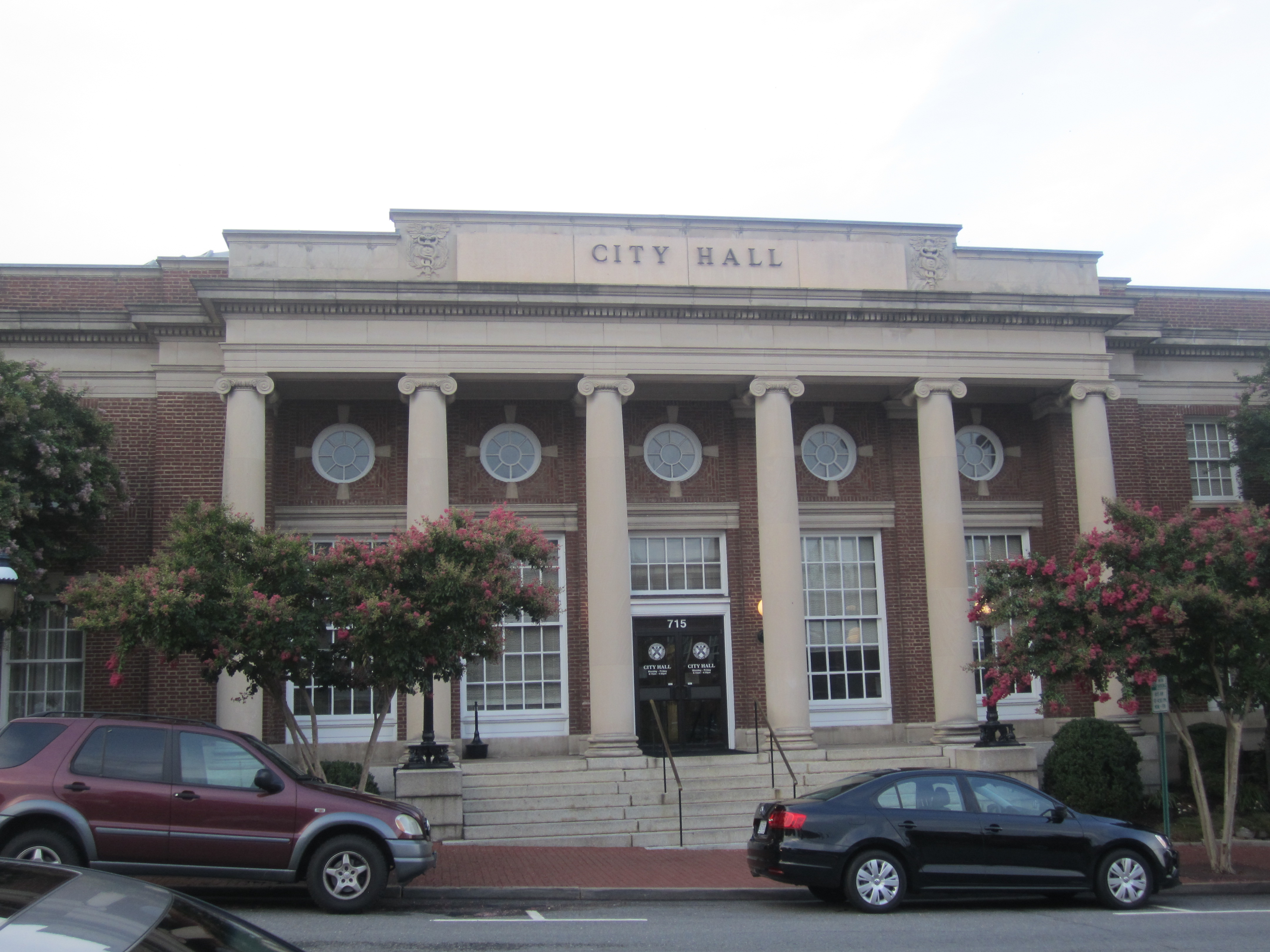
Fredericksburg City Hall building in Virginia, US, in 2011

- Charles Mortimer, 1782–1783, 1786–1787, 1788–1789
- William McWilliams, 1783–1784
- James Somerville, 1784–1785, 1787–1788, 1792–1793
- George Weedon, 1785–1786
- George French, 1789–1790, 1794–1795, 1799–1800, 1803–1804, 1805–1806, 1810–1811, 1812–1813, 1814–1815
- Benjamin Day, 1790–1791, 1804–1805
- William Harvey, 1791–1792, 1795–1796, 1797–1798
- Fontaine Maury, 1793–1794, 1796–1797, 1798–1799
- Wm. Taylor, 1798
- David C. Ker, 1800–1801, 1802–1803
- William S. Stone, 1801–1802
- Charles L. Carter, 1806–1808, 1813–1814
- William Smock, 1808–1809
- Richard Johnston, 1809–1810
- Joseph Walker, 1811–1812
- John Scott, 1815–1816
- Garret Minor, 1816–1817, 1818–1819
- Robert Mackay, 1817–1818, 1819–1820
- David Briggs, 1820–1821
- Robert Lewis, 1820–1829
- Thomas Goodwin, 1829–1836
- John H. Wallace, 1836–1838
- Benjamin Clarke, 1838–1844
- Robert Baylor Semple, 1844–1853
- John Lawrence Marye Jr., 1853–1854
- Peter Goolrick, 1854–1855, 1857–1859, 1860
- John S. Caldwell, 1855–1857
- William S. Scott, 1859–1860
- Montgomery Slaughter, 1860–1868
- Charles E. Mallam, 1868–1869
- William E. Nye, 1869–1870
- Lawrence B. Rose, 1870, 1870–1872, 1874–1877
- William Roy Mason, 1870
- Robert Banks Berrey, 1872–1874
- Hugh S. Doggett, 1877–1880
- Joseph Ward Sener, 1880–1884
- Josiah Hazard, 1884–1888
- Absalom P. Rowe, 1888–1896, 1898–1900
- William Seymour White, 1896–1897
- Henry R. Gouldman, 1897–1898
- Marion G. Willis, 1900–1904
- Thomas P. Wallace, 1904–1908
- Henry Lewis Wallace, 1908–1912
- Josiah P. Rowe, Sr., 1912–1920
- J. Garnett King, 1920-1929
- Jere M. H. Willis, 1929-1932
- R. J. Payne, 1932-1936
- William Marshall King, 1936–1947
- Claude T. Parcell, 1947
- C. O'Conor Goolrick, 1947–1948
- Josiah P. Rowe, Jr., 1948–1949
- C. M. Cowan, 1949–1964
- Josiah P. Rowe, III, 1964–1972
- Edward H. Cann, 1972-1976
- Lawrence Davies, 1976–1996
- William M. Beck, 2000–2004
- Thomas J. Tomzak, 2004–2012
- Mary Katherine Greenlaw, 2012–2023
- Kerry P. Devine, 2024–present

== See also ==
- Fredericksburg history
