= John W. Johnston =

American lawyer and politician from Abingdon, Virginia

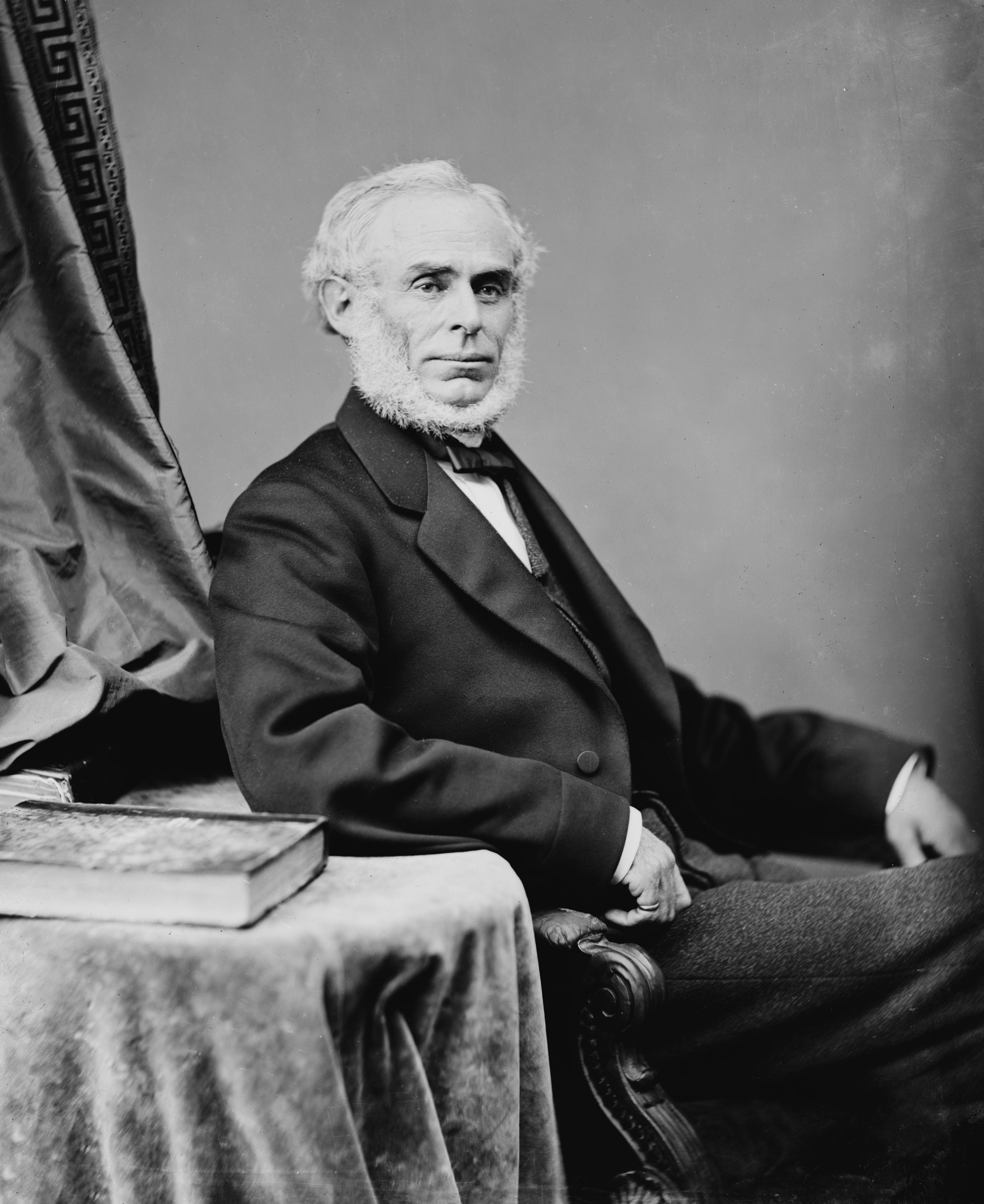

United States Senator from Virginia
- In office January 26, 1870 – March 3, 1871; March 15, 1871 – March 3, 1883
- Preceded by: John S. Carlile
- Succeeded by: Harrison H. Riddleberger

Member of the Virginia Senate from the Tazewell, Wythe, Grayson, Smyth, Carroll & Pulaski counties district
- In office December 7, 1846 – December 4, 1848
- Preceded by: James H. Piper
- Succeeded by: Thomas M. Tate

Personal details
- Born: John Warfield Johnston; September 9, 1818 "Panicello", Washington County, Virginia, U.S.
- Died: February 27, 1889 (aged 70) Richmond, Virginia, U.S.
- Party: Democratic
- Spouse: Nicketti Buchanan Floyd

John Warfield Johnston (September 9, 1818 – February 27, 1889) was an American lawyer and politician from Abingdon, Virginia. He served in the Virginia State Senate, and represented Virginia in the United States Senate when the state was readmitted after the American Civil War. He was a United States Senator for 13 years. In national politics, he was a Democrat.

Initially declared ineligible to serve in Congress because of the Fourteenth Amendment because he had sided with the Confederacy during the Civil War, he was seated after the Freedmen's Bureau declared he helped a sick and dying former slave after the conflict. Senator Johnston became the first former Confederate to serve in the United States Senate.

== Family and early life ==
Johnston was born in his paternal grandfather's house, "Panicello", near Abingdon, Virginia. He was the only child of Dr. John Warfield Johnston and Louisa Smith Bowen. His grandfather was Judge Peter Johnston, who had fought under Henry "Light Horse Harry" Lee during the Revolutionary War, and his great-grandmother was the sister of Patrick Henry. His mother was the sister of Rees T. Bowen, a Virginia politician, and his paternal uncles included Charles Clement Johnston and General Joseph Eggleston Johnston. His first cousin was U. S. Congressman Henry Bowen. Johnston's ancestry was Scottish, English, Welsh, and Scots-Irish.

Johnston attended Abingdon Academy, South Carolina College at Columbia, and the law department of the University of Virginia at Charlottesville. He was admitted to the bar in 1839 and commenced practice in Tazewell, Virginia.

On October 12, 1841, he married Nicketti Buchanan Floyd, the daughter of Governor John Floyd and Letitia Preston, and the sister of Governor John Buchanan Floyd. His wife was Catholic, having converted when young; Johnston converted after the marriage.

In 1859, he moved his family to Abingdon, Virginia, and lived at first on East Main Street. An Abingdon resident noted that "it was a delightful home to visit and the young men enjoyed the cordial welcome that they received from the old and the young." While there, the family started construction of a new home called "Eggleston", three miles (5 km) east of town; the family's affectionate name for it was "Castle Dusty". They moved in sometime after August 1860.

Johnston and Nicketti Buchanan Floyd had twelve children, one of whom was Dr. George Ben Johnston, prominent physician in Richmond who is credited with the first antiseptic operation performed in Virginia. Both the Johnston Memorial Hospital in Abingdon and the Johnston-Willis Hospital in Richmond are named after him.

== Early career ==
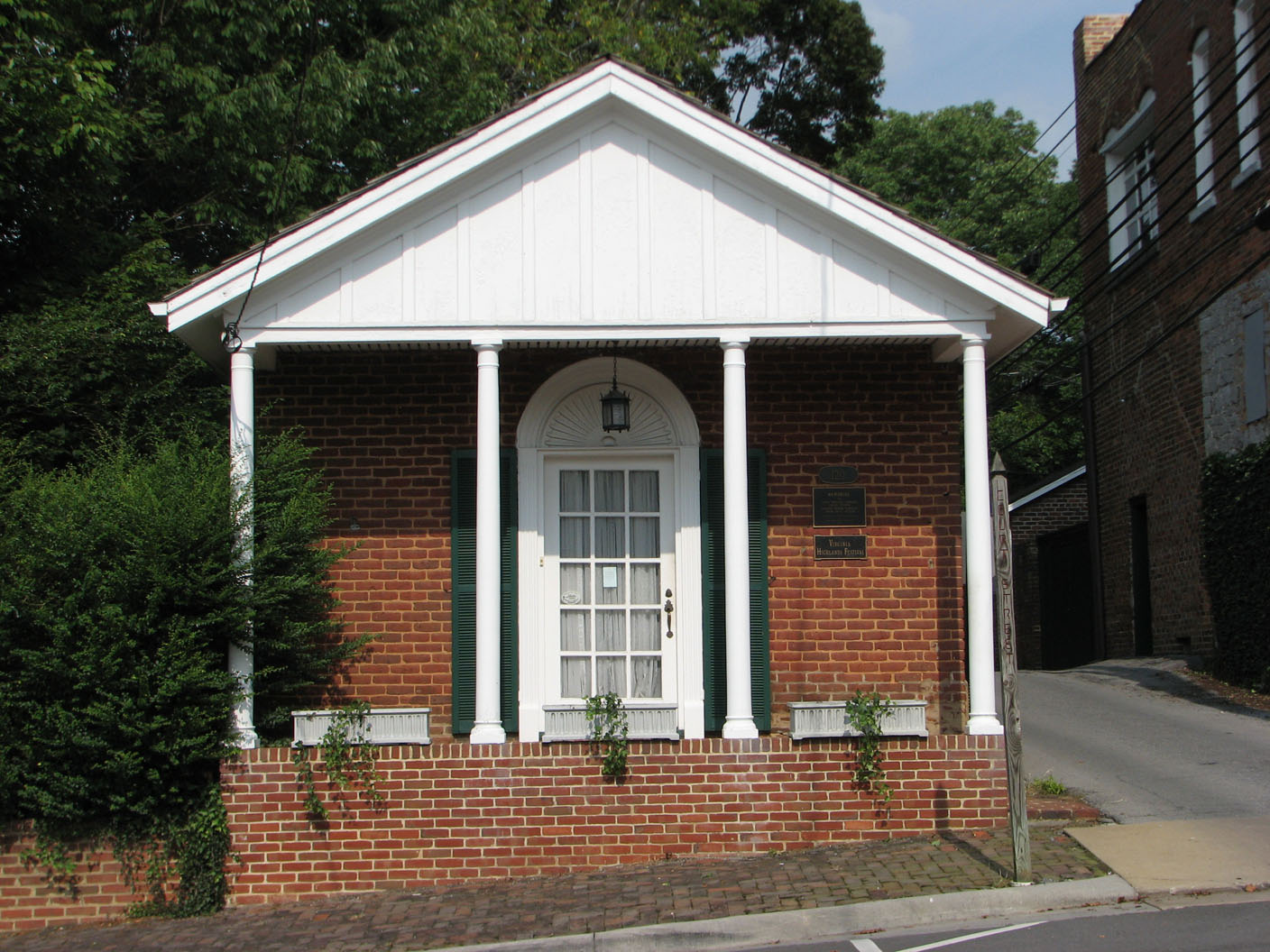
Johnston & Trigg Law Office on Court Street in downtown Abingdon. Now in possession of the Historical Society of Washington County, Virginia.

Johnston served as commonwealth attorney for Tazewell County between 1844 and 1846. In 1846, he was elected to serve the remainder of the 1846–1847 term in the Virginia Senate, representing Tazewell, Wythe, Grayson, Smyth, Carroll, and Pulaski counties. He was re-elected for the 1847–1848 session.

== Confederate sympathizer ==
During the Civil War, he held the position of Confederate States receiver, and was also elected as a councilman for the town of Abingdon in 1861. Not much is known of his activities during the war, but he did send a letter to Brigadier-General John Echols that the Order of Heroes of America, was "growing fearfully" in southwest Virginia. This secret order was composed of Union sympathizers. This information was used in conjunction with other reports to request a suspension of habeas corpus so that the military could make arrests.

After the war, in 1867, he founded the Villa Maria Academy of the Visitation in Abingdon for the education of girls. He was judge of the Circuit Superior Court of Law and Chancery of Virginia in 1869–1870. Also around 1869, he formed a law partnership with a young local attorney, and his future son-in-law, Daniel Trigg. In 1872, they set up their offices in a small building near the courthouse which became known as the Johnston-Trigg Law Office.

== Senatorial career ==
Virginia by 1869 was essentially a military zone. Gilbert C. Walker was elected as governor in this year and ushered in a moderate conservatism, with Whiggish roots. The new General Assembly ratified the Fourteenth and Fifteenth Amendments to end Reconstruction and also elected two people as representatives for the U. S. Senate, including Johnston. He was to serve the unexpired portion of a six-year term that started in March 1865. Johnston received a letter from William Mahone, sent on October 18, 1869, that he must go to Richmond "without fail, by the first train. You are Senator."

Johnston was one of the few Virginia men eligible to hold office: at the time, anyone who had fought for, or served, the former Confederacy was ineligible to hold office under the Fourteenth Amendment until their "political disabilities" were removed by Congress by a two-thirds vote. Johnston's were removed because word had reached the local Abingdon Freedmen's Bureau officer that he had helped care for an elderly former slave, Peter, who had passed through Abingdon on his way to Charlotte County, Virginia from Mississippi.

The Norfolk and Western Railroad passed 200 yards (180 m) from Johnston's house, and former slaves used the tracks as a guide to return home from where they had been sold. In the summer of 1865 Johnston aided many with food and shelter, and in August of that year he found Peter near death in a stable near the railroad; Johnston carried him to the house, where he stayed at least a month.

When Peter regained enough strength he told his story, which Johnston later wrote down and is now kept with his papers at Duke University. Peter had been a slave of a Mr. Read in Charlotte County, a neighbor of John Randolph. He had been sold (apparently because of Read's debts) to a trader, leaving behind a wife and young daughter to work a cotton field for thirty-five years in Mississippi. When he was freed, Peter walked from Mississippi until he reached Abingdon in his quest to return home. Johnston wrote: "It was evident to me and my wife that all our care could not rebuild that worn-out body, and that death was near at hand. He weakened rapidly ... His life was weary, toilsome, and full of trouble. But surely the Lord has rewards for such as he, and will give him rest in all eternity, and permit him to see Susy and his Mammy and Daddy." Peter died of tuberculosis.

The Freedmen's Bureau agent wrote to Congressman William Kelley of Pennsylvania requesting the removal of Johnston's disabilities because of his charity. Kelly did so and the bill passed both houses of Congress. Johnston only discovered all of this when he read about the passage of the bill in the newspaper.

=== Overview ===
Johnston went to Washington in December in hopes that Virginia would be readmitted to the Union. It was, however, not until January 26, 1870, that Virginia was readmitted; Johnston was able to take his seat shortly afterward. The delay was due to a Congressional need to pass an act that would allow Virginia representation in the body.

When Johnston arrived on January 28 to take his seat, he had some difficulty. George F. Edmunds of Vermont questioned whether he was the right Mr. Johnston and thought a fraud was being perpetrated until Waitman T. Willey of West Virginia vouched for Johnston's identity, allowing his qualification. Later, he was in the process of signing a document put before him, but without having read it. This was the ironclad oath, that required all white males to swear they had never borne arms against the Union or supported the Confederacy. If the senator sitting next to Johnston, Thomas F. Bayard of Delaware, had not noticed, Johnston would likely have been "disgraced ... forever in the eyes of the people of Virginia". The oath had been deemed unconstitutional in 1867, but its use was not effectively ended until 1871. At this time, Johnston was the only senator who had sided with the Confederacy—all the rest were either Northerners by birth or had been "Union men".

At the time he joined the Senate, the two parties in Virginia were the Conservatives and the Radicals. Johnston was a Conservative, which was an alliance of pre-War Democrats and Whigs. The Democrats had once been bitter rivals of the Whigs and would not join a party of that name, giving rise to the Conservative party. Which direction Johnston would vote in the national arena was unknown, but mattered little because the Senate was overwhelmingly Republican. There were only 10 Democrats at the time out of 68 senators. There was speculation that Johnston might side with the Republicans and "turn traitor to his party and state ... for patronage" based on a letter he had written to the new Virginia governor. These doubts were settled when Johnston declined a formal invitation to join the Republican caucus and went to a joint meeting of House and Senate Democrats; it was declared that "a Conservative in Virginia was a democrat in Washington". Several issues marked Johnston's senatorial career. He was caught in the middle during the debate over the Arlington Memorial. The initial proposal to relocate the dead was distasteful to Johnston, yet the ensuing debate caused him to want to defend the memory of Robert E. Lee; the need to stay quiet for the sake of the Democratic Party, however, proved decisive. Johnston was an outspoken opponent of the Texas-Pacific Bill, a sectional struggle for control of railroads in the South, which figured in the Compromise of 1877. He was also an outspoken Funder during Virginia's heated debate as to how much of its pre-War debt the state ought to have been obliged to pay back. The controversy culminated in the formation of the Readjuster Party and the appointment of William Mahone as its leader; this marked the end of Johnston's career in the Senate.

Johnston served from January 26, 1870, to March 4, 1871, and was re-elected on March 15, 1871, for the term beginning March 4, 1871. He was re-elected again in 1877 and served until March 4, 1883. He was a member Committee on Revolutionary Claims, and later served as its chairman during the Forty-fifth and Forty-seventh Congresses. He was also chairman of the Committee on Agriculture during the Forty-sixth Congress.

In November 1881, Johnston served on the Committee on Foreign Relations. It is recorded that when Clara Barton's plea to President Chester Arthur to sign the First Geneva Convention (establishing the International Red Cross), Arthur's favorable reply was referred to this committee and Johnston was named as one of the members.

=== Arlington Memorial controversy ===
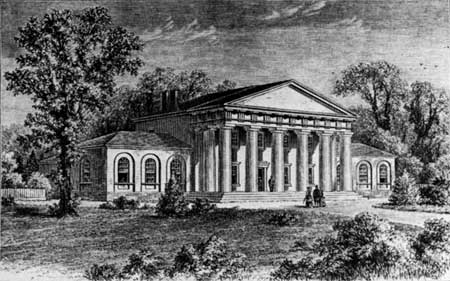
Arlington House from a pre-1861 sketch, published in 1875.

On December 13, 1870, Thomas C. McCreery (D) of Kentucky introduced a resolution regarding the Arlington House, the former home of the Confederate leader Robert E. Lee, that brought down a firestorm of objections. Arlington House had been captured by Union forces during the Civil War and its grounds were used as a cemetery for 16,000 soldiers by the end of the war. The resolution called for an investigation to establish its ownership and the possibility of returning it to Mrs. Robert E. Lee. In addition, McCreery proposed the government fix up the premises, return any Washington relics discovered, and determine whether a suitable location nearby existed to relocate the dead. Johnston described the excitement caused as the most pronounced he would see in his thirteen years in the Senate. It put him in "the most painful and embarrassing position of my life". and he was vehemently opposed:

There was something very abhorent to me in the idea of making a job of digging up and carting away the remains of thousands of people—especially as they were gallant men who had died on the field of battle. Not only was the substance of the resolution displeasing but its tone was equally so. It seemed to say: "Here, whitewash these fences, scour these floors, fix up this house and grounds, dig up these bones, and hand the premises over to the owners.

However, in the course of the speeches opposing the resolution, Johnston felt Lee's memory had been attacked and he felt duty bound to defend him. The Democratic Party, knowing his views and that of his state, approached him and asked him to keep silent for the sake of the party and the relief of Virginia. Johnston correctly predicted that he would be attacked at home. He was up for re-election, and the opposing candidates used his position against him. A delegation from the Virginia General Assembly travelled to Washington to talk with the Democrats and assess the situation and were satisfied by the reports they received.

Later, Johnston made a speech on behalf of Mrs. Lee and her Memorial proposal. His first attempt to speak was objected to and he was denied permission. Near the end of the session, when an unrelated bill was under discussion, Johnston made a motion related to it and then used the opportunity, which was allowed to Senators, to make his speech; this caused "great indignation and impatience on the floor". The Lee family and their advisors desired that the "true facts about the sale of Arlington and the nature of her claim to the property, should be placed before the country" so that, if found in her favor, she could receive compensation and then donate the property to the government. Eventually the Supreme Court of the United States did find in the family's favor in 1882.

=== Texas-Pacific Bill ===
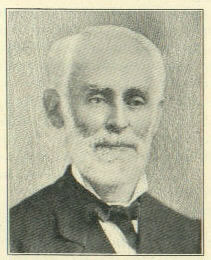
Johnston near the end of his life

When Johnston was up for re-election in 1877, he was involved in the controversial Texas-Pacific Bill, a battle between Northern and Southern railroad interests. Johnston was opposed to Tom Scott's Texas and Pacific Railway, and the bill, which favored Scott's interests. Scott was trying to persuade Southern states to accept his railroad so that they would subsequently appoint senators who would vote for the bill. Johnston's seat was vulnerable if Scott succeeded in influencing the Virginia legislature, as it was known that he opposed the bill. As Johnston wrote in a letter, "... what I have done about the Pacific road is before the people and I cannot recall it if I would. It would not be policy to retreat from my position nor am I inclined to do so, if was policy. I thought & I think that I was right & am therefore ready to take the consequences. I intend to fight it out on that line." William Mahone worked to prevent his re-election. Most Southern states went along with Scott, but Virginia and Louisiana did not, and Johnston was re-elected.

The Texas-Pacific Bill remained a bargaining chip in the Compromise of 1877, following the 1876 Presidential election crisis. Later, Johnston gave a speech in 1878 in Congress against the railroad, specifically Bill No. 942, which he viewed as "a positive menace to the commercial interests of the South".

=== Funder and Readjuster debate ===
Another issue that marked Johnston's career was the Funder vs. Readjuster debate. Funders maintained that the state was obligated to pay back its entire pre-War debt, whereas the Readjusters suggested differing, lesser figures, regarding how much was owed. The controversy culminated in the end of the Conservative Party in Virginia and the formation of the Readjuster Party and the Democratic Party. William Mahone was chosen as head of the Readjusters and they gained control of the state legislature in 1879, but not the governorship. The legislature then elected Mahone as the successor to Democrat Robert E. Withers in the U. S. Senate. However, without a sympathetic governor, they could not enact their reforms. Their next chance came in the election of 1881; their aim was to elect a governor, but most importantly to maintain control of the state legislature, since it would elect "a successor to the Hon. John W. Johnston ..." Their party succeeded and the legislature elected prominent Readjuster, and Mahone's "intimate friend", Harrison H. Riddleberger to replace Johnston, eighty-one to forty-nine.

== Death and legacy ==
After serving in the Senate, Johnston resumed his legal practice. He died in Richmond, Virginia, on February 27, 1889, aged seventy. He was conscious until his death and was aware that he was dying. On March 1, his family brought his body from Richmond to Wytheville, where he was buried in St. Mary's Cemetery.

On May 11, 1903, a ceremony was held to install the portraits of deceased judges in the Washington County Courthouse. David F. Bailey was the speaker that presented the portrait of Johnston. In his speech, he described Johnston:

He was not an orator, but a strong debater—powerful in clean cut argument. He was a dangerous opponent. You never caught him asleep. You never saw him demoralized ... He was temperate in all things. In nothing was he a fanatic. He was the friend of the poor. Need I say this in Washington County? His liberality was limited only by his ability to bestow. He was at all times the young lawyer's friend.

Johnston was outlived by his wife, Nicketti, who died on June 9, 1908, aged eighty-nine.

== Works ==
- The True Southern Pacific Railroad Versus the Texas Pacific Railroad: Speech of Hon. John W. Johnston 1878
- Repudiation in Virginia, The North American Review. Volume 134, Issue 303. University of Northern Iowa, Cedar Falls, Iowa. February 1882.
- Railway Land-grants, The North American Review. Volume 140, Issue 340. University of Northern Iowa, Cedar Falls, Iowa. March 1885
- The True South vs the Silent South, The Century. Volume 32, Issue 1, New York. May 1886

== Notes ==
U.S. Senate
Preceded by John S. Carlile	U.S. senator (Class 2) from Virginia; January 26, 1870 – March 3, 1871; March 15, 1871 – March 4, 1883; Served alongside: John F. Lewis, Robert E. Withers, William Mahone	Succeeded by Harrison H. Riddleberger
