= 18th Virginia Infantry Regiment =

- Flag of Virginia, 1861
- Active: May 1861 – Spring 1865
- Disbanded: April 1865
- Country: Confederacy
- Allegiance: Confederate States of America
- Branch: Confederate States Army
- Type: Infantry
- Engagements: First Battle of Bull Run; Seven Days' Battles; Second Battle of Bull Run; Battle of Antietam; Battle of Fredericksburg; Siege of Suffolk; Battle of Gettysburg; Battle of Cold Harbor; Siege of Petersburg; Battle of Five Forks; Battle of Sailor's Creek

Commanders
- Notable commanders: Colonel Robert E. Withers

The 18th Virginia Infantry Regiment was an infantry regiment raised in Virginia for service in the Confederate States Army during the American Civil War. It fought mostly with the Army of Northern Virginia.

The 18th Virginia completed its organization in May, 1861. Its members were recruited at Danville and Farmville, and in the counties of Nottoway, Cumberland, Prince Edward, Appomattox, Pittsylvania, and Charlotte.

Company A (Danville Blues) - many men from Danville Virginia

Company B (Danville Grays) - many men from Danville, Virginia

Company C (Nottoway Rifle Guards) - many men from Nottoway County

Company D (Prospect Rifle Grays) - many men from Prince Edward County

Company E (Black Eagle Rifles) - many men from Cumberland County

Company F (Farmville Guard) - many men from Farmville, Virginia (Prince Edward and Cumberland Counties)

Company G (Nottoway Grays) - many men from Nottoway County

Company H (Appomattox Grays) - many men from Appomattox County

Company I (Spring Garden Blues) - many men from Pittsylvania County

Company K (Charlotte Rifles) - many men from Charlotte County, mustered in February 1861. Reorganized April 1862 with Captains Thomas J. Spencer, Mathew Lyle, Robert Morton Shepperson, Martin Luther Covington, William Henry Smith. The unit fought at First Manassas under General Cocke, then was assigned to General Pickett's, Garnett's, and Hunton's Brigade. It participated in the campaigns of the Army of Northern Virginia from Williamsburg to Gettysburg except when it was detached to Suffolk with Longstreet. Later it served in North Carolina, returned to Virginia, and took an active part in the battles of Drewry's Bluff and Cold Harbor. The 18th endured the hardships of the Petersburg trenches north of the James River and saw action around Appomattox.

It lost 6 killed and 13 wounded at First Manassas and in April, 1862, had 700 men fit for duty. The unit reported 206 casualties during the Seven Days' Battles, and of the 120 engaged in the Maryland Campaign, thirty-six percent of the 312 in action were killed, wounded, or missing. Many were captured at Sayler's Creek and only 2 officers and 32 men surrendered.

The field officers were Colonels Henry A. Carrington and Robert E. Withers, Lieutenant Colonel George C. Cabell, and Major Edwin G. Wall.

Robert Lewis Dabney briefly served as chaplain for the regiment, before becoming chief of staff for Stonewall Jackson.

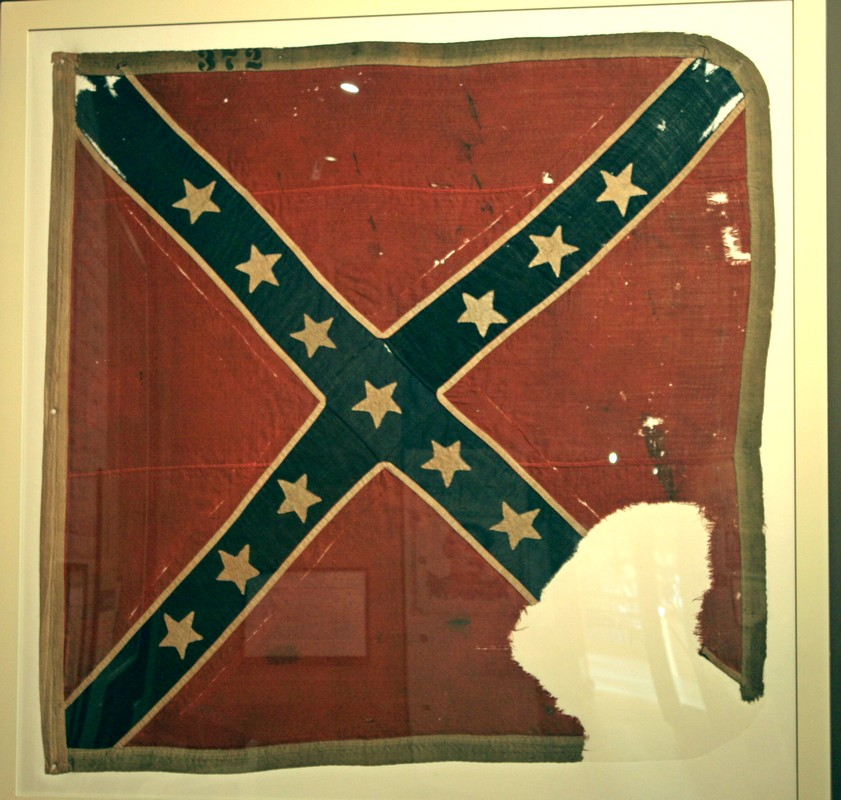
The 18th Virginia Infantry Regiment battle flag at the Appomattox museum.

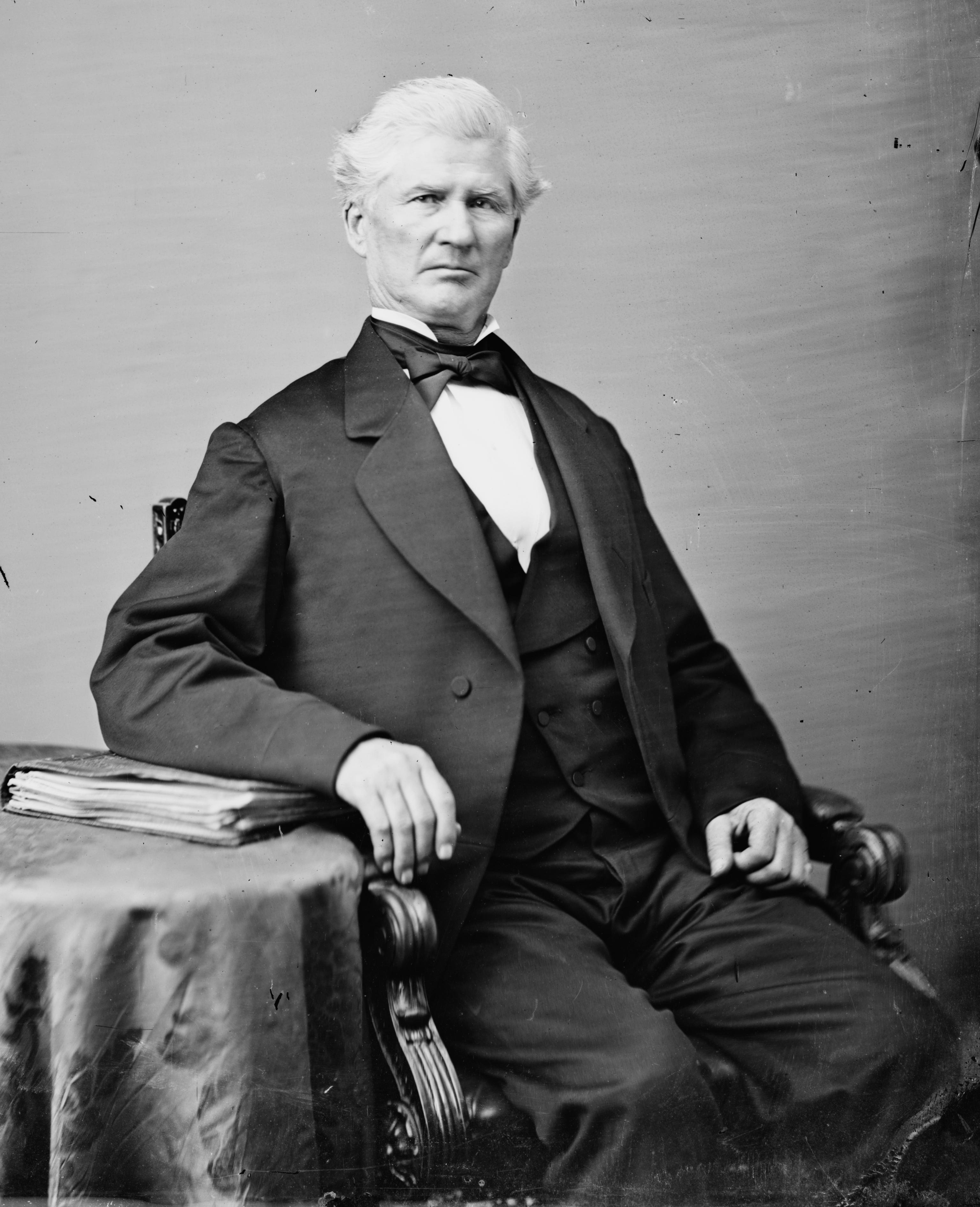
Colonel Robert E. Withers

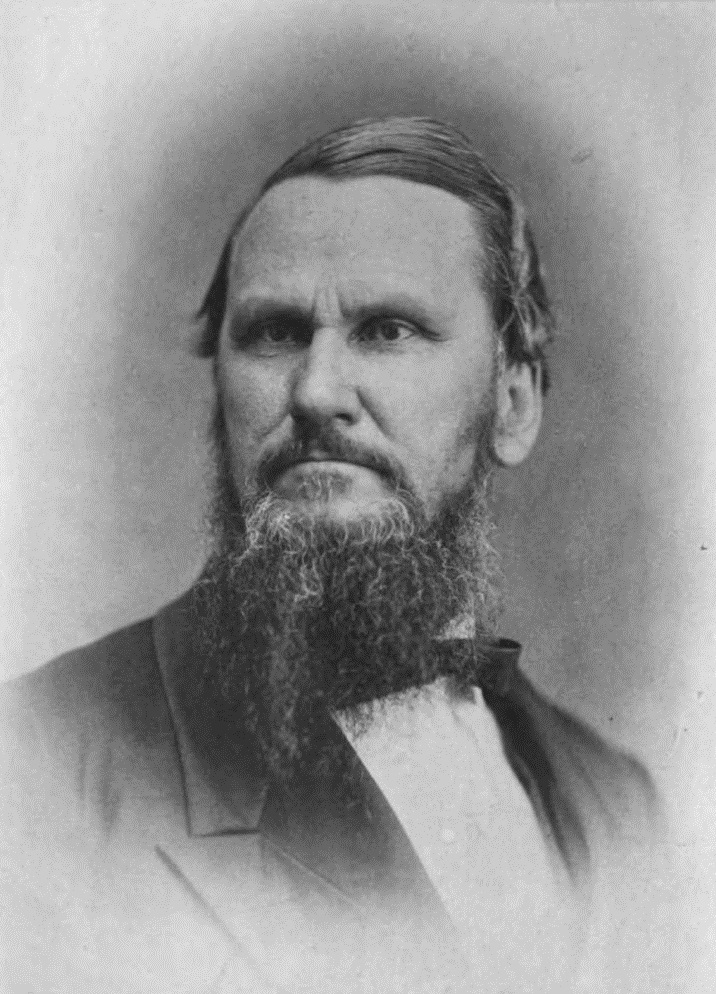
Chaplain Robert Lewis Dabney

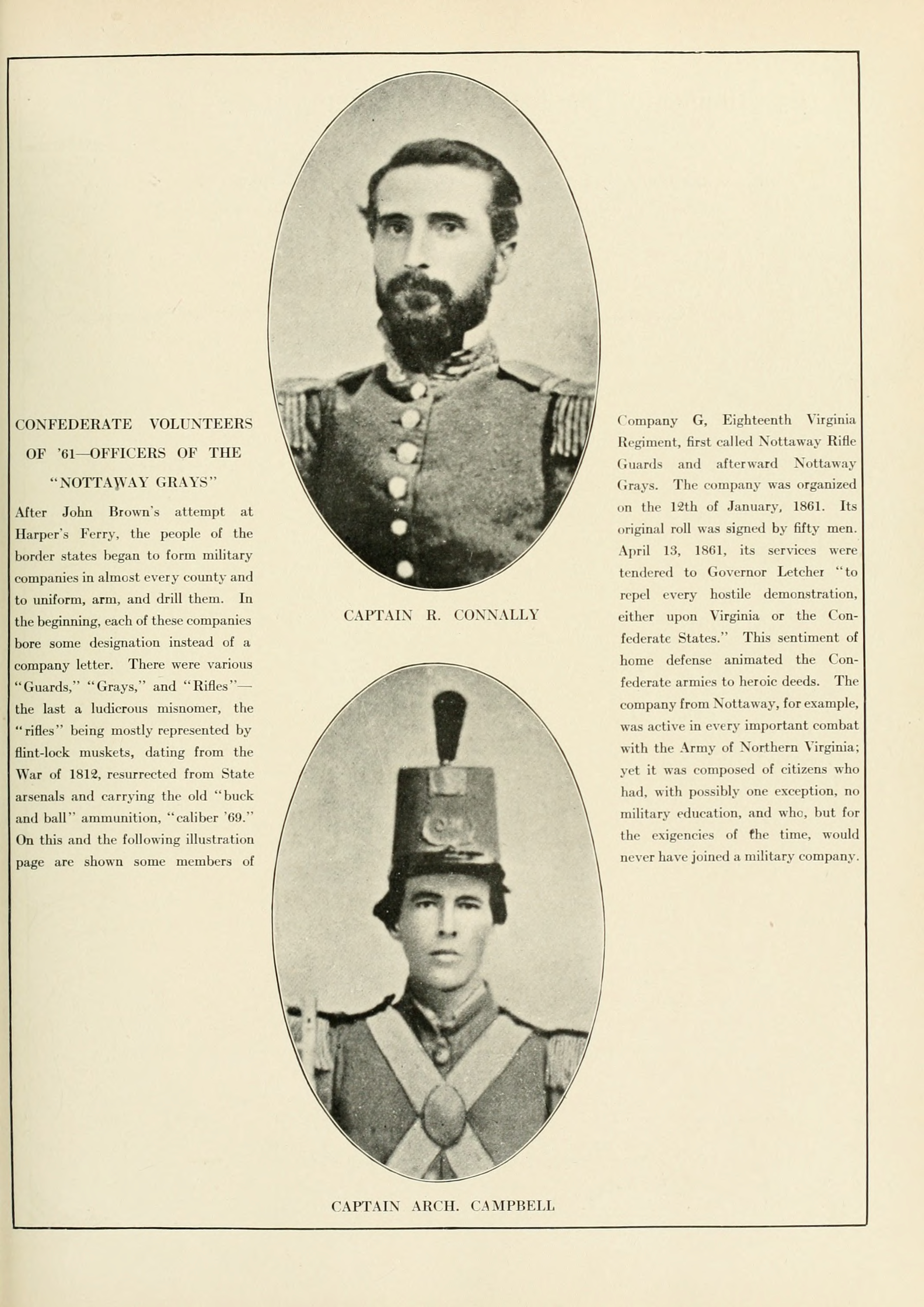
Two Officers of Company "G" 18th Va Infantry; the officer at bottom Captain Arch. Campbell was killed in April 1865 at the Battle of Sayler's Creek -ironically next to Nottoway County in Prince Edward County

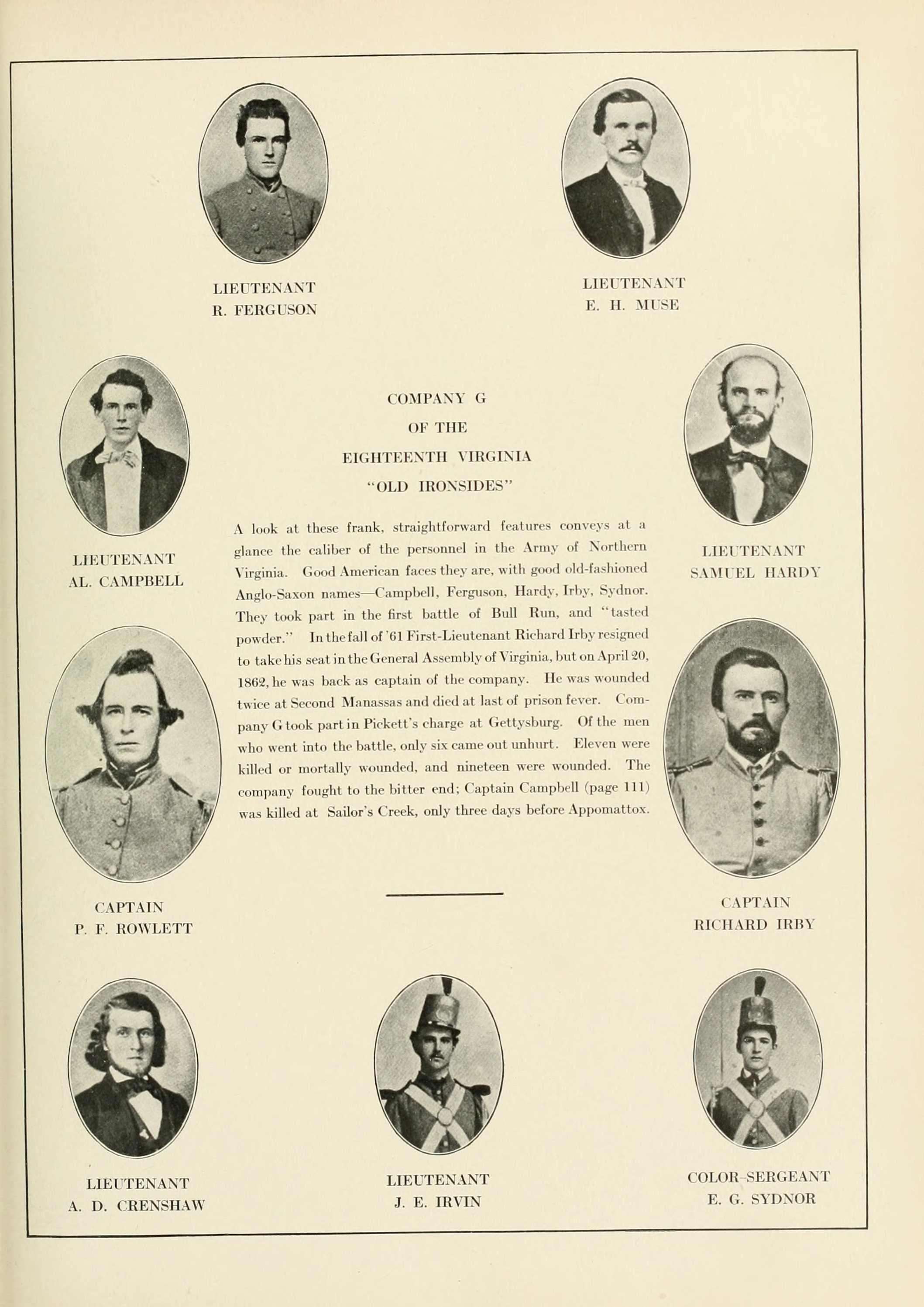
Nine more officers of Company "G" 18th Va Infantry

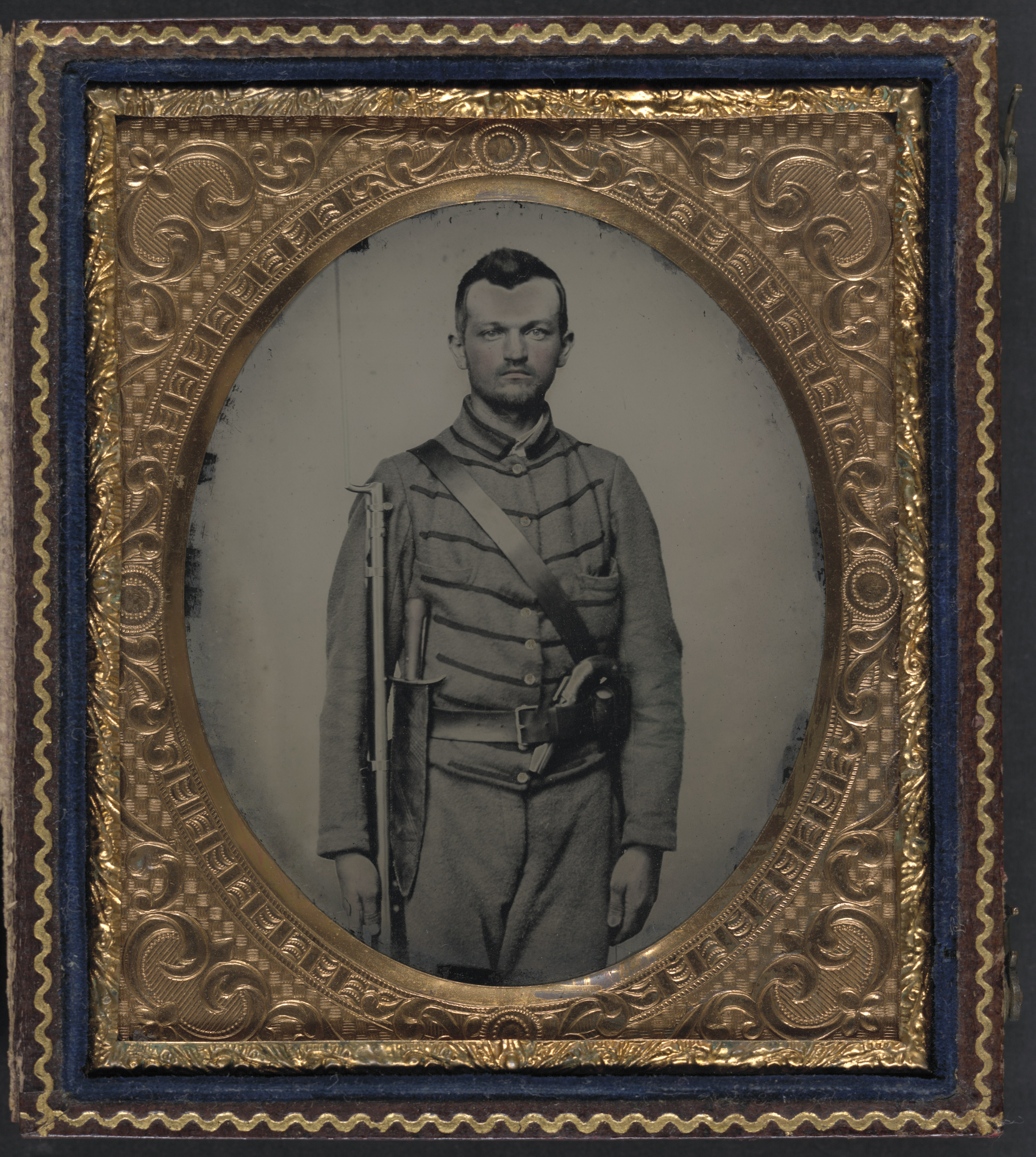
Private John G. Lee of Company H, 18th Virginia Infantry Regiment

== See also ==
- List of Virginia Civil War units
