= John E. Massey =

American minister and politician (1819–1901)

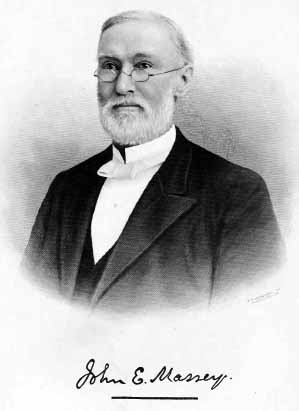

15th Lieutenant Governor of Virginia
- In office January 1, 1886 – January 1, 1890
- Governor: Fitzhugh Lee
- Preceded by: John F. Lewis
- Succeeded by: James Hoge Tyler

Member of the Virginia Senate from the Albemarle and Greene Counties district
- In office December 5, 1877 – December 3, 1879
- Preceded by: Robert S. Beazley
- Succeeded by: Everett W. Early

Member of the Virginia House of Delegates for Albemarle County
- In office January 1, 1874 – December 4, 1877 Serving with Richard G. Crank, B.H. Magruder, Thomas M. Dunn
- Preceded by: J.A. Early
- Succeeded by: T.L. Michie

Personal details
- Born: April 2, 1819 Spotsylvania County, Virginia, U.S.
- Died: April 24, 1901 (aged 82)
- Party: Democrat; Readjuster Party
- Spouse: Margaret Ann Kable (m.1847)
- Children: 7
- Profession: Preacher, politician
- Religion: Baptist

John Edward "Parson" Massey (April 2, 1819 – April 24, 1901) was a Baptist preacher and politician in Albemarle County, Virginia who served in both houses of the Virginia General Assembly after the American Civil War before becoming Virginia's 15th Lieutenant Governor (January 1, 1886, until January 1, 1890). ving as an adult, Massey founded the short-lived Readjuster Party and is sometimes considered Democrat.

== Early life and education ==
Born in Spotsylvania County, Virginia to devout Baptists Benjamin Massey and his wife, the former Elizabeth Chewning, he received an education suitable for his class. Like his elder brother Joseph, he attended the Virginia Baptist Seminary (now the University of Richmond).

== Prewar career ==
Massey taught school in addition to his preaching duties. By 1860 he lived near Scottsville in Albemarle County, Virginia. He owned slaves in the 1860 federal census.

== Postwar career ==
After the war, he continued his career as a Baptist preacher in Albemarle County. Massey considered himself the founder of the short-lived Readjusters.

He first won election to the Virginia House of Delegates when Albemarle County voters refused to re-elect J.A. Early, J.C. Hill and G.B. Stephens, but instead elected Massey, Richard G. Crank and B.H. Magruder, then re-elected Massey once before he successfully ran for the Virginia Senate, although he served only two years.

Massey allied with the "Big Four" Readjusters who revolted to buck Confederate-general-turned-Republican-boss William Mahone. The "Big Four" were Andrew M. Lybrook of Patrick County, Peyton G. Hale of Grayson County, Samuel H. Newberry of Bland County, and Benjamin F. Williams of Nottoway County. Massey was elected Virginia's Lieutenant Governor in 1885, succeeding fellow Readjuster John F. Lewis, and presided over the Virginia Senate in the 1886 and 1889 sessions, before being J. Hoge Tyler assumed those offices.

== Death and legacy ==
Upon Massey's death, he was buried in Charlottesville's Oakhill cemetery. His autobiography appeared posthumously in 1909, edited by Elizabeth H. Hancock.

Political offices
Preceded by John F. Lewis	Lieutenant Governor of Virginia; 1886–1890	Succeeded by James Hoge Tyler
