= Vern Rowe =

Australian rules footballer

Personal information
- Full name: Vernon Wasley Rowe
- Born: 11 March 1896; Windsor, Victoria
- Died: 23 November 1929 (aged 33); Mitiamo, Victoria
- Original team: Williamstown

Playing career^{1}
Years	Club	Games (Goals)
1920	Melbourne	7 (7)
- ^{1} Playing statistics correct to the end of 1920.

Vernon Wasley Rowe (11 March 1896 – 23 November 1929) was an Australian rules footballer who played with Melbourne in the Victorian Football League (VFL).
