= Len Rowe =

English cricketer and rugby union player

Personal information
- Full name: Leonard Charles Rowe
- Born: 23 January 1938; Northampton, Northamptonshire, England
- Died: 1 April 2009 (aged 71); Durham, County Durham, England
- Nickname: Len
- Batting: Right-handed
- Bowling: Right-handed

Domestic team information
- Years: Team
- 1963–1966: Durham
- 1958: Oxford University

Career statistics
Competition	First-class
Matches	5
Runs scored	61
Batting average	7.62
100s/50s	–/–
Top score	35
Balls bowled	–
Wickets	–
Bowling average	–
5 wickets in innings	–
10 wickets in match	–
Best bowling	–
Catches/stumpings	5/–
- Source: Cricinfo, 12 August 2011

Leonard Charles Rowe (23 January 1938 – 1 April 2009) was an English cricketer and rugby union player. In cricket, Rowe was a right-handed batsman. He was born in Northampton, Northamptonshire.

Having played for the Northamptonshire Second XI since 1955, Rowe later undertook studies at Oxford University, where he made his first-class debut for Oxford University against Gloucestershire in 1958. He made 4 further first-class appearances for the university in 1958, the last of which came against the touring New Zealanders. Used as an opening batsman, Rowe had little success in his brief first-class career, scoring 61 runs at an average of 7.62, with a highest score of 35, made after he had been shifted to the middle order. During this time he also played rugby union for both Northampton Saints and Oxford University.

He later joined Durham, making his debut for the county in the 1963 Minor Counties Championship against Cumberland. He played Minor counties cricket for Durham from 1963 to 1966, making 10 appearances in the Minor Counties Championship. Outside cricket, Rowe worked as a teacher. He taught English at Durham School, Ferryhill Comprehensive and Durham Johnston School, where he was head of English at the latter two. He retired from teaching in 1994. In later died at his home in Durham, County Durham on 1 April 2009, following a battle against cancer. He was survived by his wife, Margaret, four sons and eleven grandchildren.
