= George Robert Rowe =

English physician

- Born: 1792
- Died: 25 January 1861 (aged 68–69)
- Occupation: Physician

George Robert Rowe (1792 – 25 January 1861) was an English physician.

== Biography ==
Rowe was born in 1792, and pursued his medical studies at St. Bartholomew's Hospital. He was admitted a member of the London College of Surgeons on 12 March 1812, and he subsequently entered the army, where he served as surgeon during the later years of the Peninsular War. He at length settled at Chigwell in Essex, and there practised for many years. He was admitted a member of the Royal College of Physicians in 1840, and in 1846 he moved into Golden Square, though he still continued to practise in Essex. He relinquished his country work about 1848, when he took the house in Cavendish Square in which he died on 25 January 1861. He was an honorary physician to the Royal Dramatic College and a member of the London Medical Society. He wrote:

- ‘A Practical Treatise on the Nervous Diseases which are denominated Hypochondriasis,’ 2nd edit. 1841; 16th edit. 1860.
- ‘On some Important Diseases of Females,’ London, 1844 (2nd edit. 1857). This work reached a second edition.

He also contributed to the ‘Lancet’ ‘Observations on Cancer cured by Calcium Chloride’ (1813, p. 687) and ‘The Abernethian Oration delivered as President of the Abernethian Society’ (1849, p. 390).
