= Absalom P. Rowe =

American politician (1817–1900)

Member of the Virginia House of Delegates from the Fredericksburg district
- In office 1879–1880

Personal details
- Born: Absalom Peyton Rowe; November 17, 1817 Spotsylvania County, Virginia, U.S.
- Died: June 1, 1900 (aged 82) Fredericksburg, Virginia, U.S.
- Resting place: Fredericksburg City Cemetery
- Spouse: Almedia Frances Gayle (m. 1845)
- Children: 8, including Maurice
- Relatives: Maurice B. Rowe III (great-grandson)
- Occupation: Politician
- Nickname: Marse Ab

Absalom Peyton Rowe (November 17, 1817 – June 1, 1900) was an American politician from Virginia. He served as mayor of Fredericksburg, Virginia, from 1888 to 1896 and from 1898 to his death. He also served in the Virginia House of Delegates from 1879 to 1880.

== Early life ==
Absalom Peyton Rowe was born on November 17, 1817, in Spotsylvania County, Virginia, to George Rowe. His father was a Baptist minister. At the age of five, he moved with his family to Fredericksburg.

== Career ==
Rowe worked as a produce merchant in Fredericksburg and after a number of years, he managed a stock farm and worked as a breeder. He served in the Confederate States Army as a quartermaster.

Rowe was a member of the Virginia House of Delegates, representing Fredericksburg, from 1879 to 1880. He served as mayor of Fredericksburg from July 1, 1888, to June 30, 1896, and from July 1, 1898, to his death. He was re-elected as mayor on May 24, 1900, shortly before his death. While mayor, he helped support the building of the Mary Washington statue in Fredericksburg.

Rowe was the first president of the Agricultural Society.

== Personal life ==
Rowe married Almedia Frances Gayle, daughter of Fanny (née Gatewood) and Josiah P. Gayle, on June 2, 1845. They had eight children, including Maurice Broaddus, Josiah P., A. Prescott and Alvin T. His son Maurice was a state delegate and his son Josiah also served as mayor of Fredericksburg. His grandson Josiah P. Rowe Jr. also served as mayor of Fredericksburg. His great-grandson was Maurice B. Rowe III. Rowe was a member of the Baptist Church in Fredericksburg. He went by the nickname "Marse Ab".

Rowe died on June 1, 1900, at his home on Hanover Street in Fredericksburg. He was buried in Fredericksburg City Cemetery.
