= Anna Wang Roe =

American neuroscientist

- Born: 4 November 1961 (age 64); Taiwan
- Education: Harvard University (B.A.); MIT (Ph.D.)
- Known for: Visual cortical organization and circuitry, Brain Plasticity, Neurotechnology
- Scientific career
- Fields: Neuroscience
- Workplaces: New York University, Nathan Kline Institute for Psychiatric Research, Zhejiang University, Oregon Health and Science University, Vanderbilt University, Yale School of Medicine
- Doctoral advisor: Mriganka Sur (doctoral advisor, MIT); Daniel Ts'o and Torsten Wiesel (postdoctoral advisor, Rockefeller University, Baylor College of Medicine)

Anna Wang Roe (born 1961, last name: Roe, middle name: Wang) is an American neuroscientist, She has held professorships at Yale University, Vanderbilt University, Oregon Health & Sciences University, and Zhejiang University in Hangzhou, China. She is currently Director of Translational Neuroscience at the Nathan Kline Institute for Psychiatric Research and Professor of Psychiatry and Neuroscience at New York University in New York, USA. She is known for her studies on the functional organization and connectivity of cerebral cortex and for bringing interdisciplinary approaches to address questions in systems neuroscience.

== Career ==
Anna Wang Roe obtained her B.A. from Harvard University in 1984, majoring in biochemistry with special field of interest in neurobiology. She received her Ph.D. in Brain and Cognitive Science from MIT in 1991, under the supervision of Mriganka Sur. During her doctoral studies, she developed an experimental paradigm known as the 'rewired ferret' for studying the development and plasticity of the brain. After obtaining her Ph.D., she went on to undertake post-doctoral training with Dr. Torsten Wiesel and Dr. Daniel Y Ts'o at Baylor College of Medicine (1991–1992) and continued with Dr. Daniel Y Ts'o at Baylor College of Medicine (1993–1995) where she studied the functional organization of the primary and secondary visual cortical areas of the primate brain using Intrinsic Signal Optical Imaging. In 1996, as a visiting scholar at University of Queensland in Brisbane, Australia, she studied the visual system of marmosets and flying foxes and auditory system of cats.

Roe returned to the United States in 1996 where she started her first faculty position as an assistant professor (tenure track) in the Department of Neurobiology chaired by Pasko Rakic at the Yale School of Medicine. Her laboratory moved to Vanderbilt University in 2003, where she held professorships in Psychology, Radiology, and Biomedical Engineering until 2015. At Vanderbilt, her research was primarily on the visual and somatosensory system of primates. From 2016 to 2020, Roe was appointed as a professor of Neuroscience at the Oregon National Primate Research Center at the Oregon Health & Science University.

In 2015, Roe founded the 'Interdisciplinary Institute for Neuroscience and Technology (ZIINT)' at the Zhejiang University in Hangzhou, China, where she held a Qiushi Distinguished professorship in the School of Medicine and Department of Biomedical Engineering. The institute focused on fundamental research in systems and cognitive neuroscience via interdisciplinary neurotechnological approaches. She is the founding director of ZIINT, and of Zhejiang University-Siemens Joint Brain Imaging Research Center.

Roe is active in scientific societies such as Society for Neuroscience, SPIE Photonics West, International Society for Magnetic Resonance in Medicine (ISMRM), Organization for Human Brain Mapping (OHBM), and Roe serves as the associate editor of several scientific journals. She has been a standing member of NIH study sections and conducts grant reviews for funding agencies in the US, Europe, Israel, and China. She also holds advisory roles for university research and faculty development.

== Research ==
=== Functional organization of visual cortex ===
Since the discovery of functional columns (proposed as canonical units of organization) in primary visual cortex, she has been driven by the question of how the brain organizes information at mesoscale. She has pursued this question by examining the columnar organization of visual cortical areas V1, V2, and V4, asking what emergent properties are newly organized at each higher level of representation. Using optical imaging, electrophysiology, and anatomical methods, my studies established the topography and modular organization within three functional stripes types in area V2 (Roe and Ts'o 1995 J Neurosci). With the use of 'illusions' to distinguish 'what V2 sees' that 'what V1 does not see', she revealed what properties were organized in V2 that were absent in V1. These included

- in thin stripes, different surface properties (e.g. color Lu 2008 Cereb Cortex), brightness (Hung 2001 Vision Res, Roe 2005 PNAS),
- in thick/pale stripes, illusory contours and motion induced contours (Ramsden 2001 Cereb Cortex, Rasch 2012 J Neurophys, Lu 2010 Neuron), and
- in thick stripes, depth properties (near-to-far disparity Chen 2008 Neuron, Chen 2017 PNAS).

In V4, she further discovered (Tanigawa 2010 Nature Neurosci) bands of 'color' (higher order hue maps Du 2022 Frontiers in Neurosci) and 'shape' (curvature, Hu 2020 Elife) representation. These studies have supported the view that, although neuronal responses to the same stimuli exist in many areas, it is the organization of neuronal responses into computational clusters that reveal fundamental emerging parameters in each area. Thus, each area focuses on (i.e. maps at mesoscale) a handful of de novo parameters, revealing the modular basis for emerging computations and provides insight into inter-areal flowchart.

=== Columnar connectome: understanding mesoscale circuits through focal brain stimulation ===
The columnar (mesoscale) organization of information in the brain predicts that brain networks are composed of mesoscale nodes. Because of a lack of methodology to systematically and rapidly address this possibility, she developed in vivo 'functional tracing methods' whereby stimulation of single functional columns led to activation of connected nodes, which were then mapped with optical imaging or fMRI. Three in vivo stimulation methods (electrical stimulation, optogenetics, infrared neural stimulation INS) corroborated and complemented each other. For example, focal optogenetic stimulation of single orientation in monkey V1 revealed anatomy-like local columnar orientation networks; both same orientation enhanced networks and orthogonal suppressed networks were simultaneously revealed (INS: Tian 2025 Cell Rep Meth, estim: Hu 2020 Cereb Cortex, optogenetics: Chernov 2018 PNAS). Focal electrical stimulation in V2 revealed canonical, repeating columnar micro-circuits in V2 and with V1 (Hu 2022 Curr Biol). For studying networks at brainwide scale, she have developed INS (1870 nm) coupled with high field fMRI. INS delivers micropulses of heat transients, is non-viral, rapid, non-damaging, MR-compatible and human compatible (Pan 2023 Brain Stim). In 7T fMRI, she showed that INS leads to activation of functionally connected monosynaptic and disynaptic nodes, revealing astonishing brainwide networks of mesoscale nodes linking sensory, motor, associative, and limbic areas. Patterned INS delivered via optical fiber bundles selectively induces higher order inter-areal (illusory contour) effects (Tian 2024 Nature Comm, Tian 2025 Cell Rep Meth). A novel and fundamental result is that each mesoscale stimulation site in every area stimulated (cortical and subcortical) leads to a brainwide columnar network, and that shifting the stimulation site reveals systematic shifts of the columnar network (Xu 2019 Science Adv, Shi 2021 Neuroimage, Yao 2023 J Comp Neurol, Ping 2025 National Science Rev). These findings are fundamental. They suggest a global systematic mesoscale architecture, one that may underlie rapid, flexible, efficient information processing. She will generate columnar connectomes for several brain areas to model a rule-based brain architecture.

=== Role of cortical columnar networks in awake, behaving monkeys ===
Using a multimodal approach (OI, fMRI, ephys, anatomy), she has studied visual processing in V1, V2, and V4 in awake, fixating monkeys (Vnek PNAS 1999, Lu Neuron 2010, Chen PNAS 2017, Tanigawa Nature Neurosci 2010); in monkeys performing feature-specific choice tasks (Tanigawa Frontiers 2016, Zhou 2023 Cell Rep); and in monkeys implanted with Ecog arrays to study columnar basis of information flow between prefrontal and temporal cortex during feature working memory tasks (Zhou 2023 Cell Reports). She examines the role of the newly discovered foveolar cortical complex in natural looking behavior; together with Charles Schroeder's and Ken Shepard's labs, she will combine imaging and electrophysiological methods (large high density mesh electrodes and multilaminar electrodes) to evaluate dynamic interactions between feature-specific columns at and away from the foveolar location. As a preview to future studies, based on the ability to map mesoscale organizations in the dorsal and ventral pathways in 7T MRI (Wang 2024 Prog Neurobiol), they have developed approaches in ultrahigh field MRI to measure behavioral curves, map functional brainwide mesoscale networks, and conduct neural and behavioral modulation via column-targeted INS (Shi "Contrast Discrimination in Awake Macaque with 7T MRI" ISMRM 2024, Singapore).

=== BMI 2.0: a new approach to visual cortical prosthetics ===
The history of BMI research has been marked by discoveries that focal stimulation elicits functionally specific percepts, motor movements, and even memories and thoughts. Despite great efforts, current VCPs have not yet achieved systematic perception of basic features such as fine form, color, or depth perception. At least three primary and non-trivial challenges must be addressed:

- enabling stimulation across multiple and distant sites in the brain in a spatiotemporally dynamic manner,
- enabling stimulation with appropriate (mesoscale) precision, and
- doing so in a targeted fashion that uses our knowledge of the brain's functional organization.

Towards this goal, she has been working on demonstrating that a column-based visual cortical prosthetic (VCP) can provide widefield, plannable perception of form and color. She has chosen near infrared stimulation (INS, 1870 nm) because it is not dependent on viral transfection, allowing easier translation to humans (Pan 2024 Brain Stim). By designing arrays of optical fibers apposed to visual cortex, she predicted that the selection of desired columns for color, orientation, hue, curvature, motion direction, and depth will achieve feature specific percepts. They have now shown, by using such arrays, that higher cortical activations 'illusory contour' activations are very similar to what visual stimuli evoke (Tian 2024 Nature Comm, 2025 Cell Rep Meth). They have also shown that INS stimulation in V1 leads to perceptible phosphenes to which monkeys saccade (Roe Frontiers in Neuroanat 2015) as well as predictable behavioral and BOLD signal shifts in discrimination tasks (Shi "Contrast Discrimination in Awake Macaque with 7T MRI", ISMRM 2024, Singapore). Thus, she aims to generate predictable, rich, featureful percepts by directly accessing mapped feature columns. This approach is novel in concept and technology, and may be applied to other brain areas. Further miniaturization and integration with electrical recording methods will expand the capabilities of this system.

== Awards and honours ==
- 2024: Keynote Speaker. Prime-DRE Annual Conference
- 2024: Plenary Speaker. SPIE Photonics West
- 2024: Qiushi Distinguished Professor at Zhejiang University
- 2023: D-Index: #1 in Neuroscience at Zhejiang University, #46 in Neuroscience China
- 2019: 2019 Top 10 Medical Technologies in China: Xu et al 2019 Science Adv
- 2019: Elected Fellow of SPIE
- 2018 & 2020: Gordon Research Conference Organizer
- 2017: International Neuropsychological Symposium Member
- 2017: Elected Senior Member of SPIE
- 2016: Plenary Speaker. International Society for Magnetic Resonance in Medicine (ISMRM)
- 2015: AAAS Fellow
- 2014: Member, Key Laboratory of Biomedical Engineering of Ministry of Education
- 1998–2003: David and Lucile Packard Foundation Fellowship
- 1997–1999: Alfred P. Sloan Research Fellowship
- 1996–1999: Whitehall Foundation Research Fellowship
- 1991-1994: NIH NRSA Post-doctoral Fellowship, Rockefeller University and Baylor College of Medicine
- 1993: Winter Conference on Brain Research Fellowship Award, Whistler, Canada
- 1989-1991: Whittaker Health Sciences Fellowship, MIT
- 1986-1898: NIGMS Graduate Traineeship, MIT

== Selected publications ==
- Wang JB*, Liu Y, Ma Y, Lin L, Berman AJL, Bollmann S, Polimeni JR**, Roe AW** (2025) In vivo 7-tesla MRI of non-human primate intracortical microvascular architecture. Neuron, DOI: 10.1016/j.neuron.2025.05.028. [IF 14.7]
- Ping A*, Wang JB, García-Cabezas MA, Li LH, Zhang JM, Zhu JM**, Gothard K**, Roe AW** (2025) Brainwide mesoscale functional networks revealed by infrared neural stimulation of the amygdala. National Science Review, 12(4):nwae473. DOI: 10.1093/nsr/nwae473. [IF 16.3]
- Tian F*, Liu Y*, Chen M, Schriver KE, Roe AW** (2025) Selective activation of mesoscale functional circuits via multi-channel infrared stimulation of cortical columns in ultra-high field 7T MRI. Cell Rep Meth 5:100961, doi.org/10.1016/j.crmeth.2024.100961 [IF 4.3]
- Qian M*, Wang JB*, Gao Y, Zhou DF, Liu Y, Zhang XT**, Hu JM**, Roe AW** (2025) Multiple foveolar representations in awake macaque monkey imaged in 7T MRI. Nature Neurosci. DOI: 10.1038/S41593-024-01810-4. [IF 21.2]
- Tian FY*, Zhang Y, Schriver KE, Hu JM**, Roe AW** (2024) A novel interface for cortical columnar neuromodulation with multi-point infrared neural stimulation. Nature Comm, 15(1):6528. DOI: 10.1038/s41467-024-50375-0. https://sciencecast.org/casts/tpur2jsq4n8l [IF 14.7]
- Wang JB*, Du X, Yao S, Li L, Tanigawa H, Zhang X, Roe AW** (2024) Mesoscale organization of ventral and dorsal visual pathways in macaque monkey revealed by 7T fMRI. Progress in Neurobiol. 1:234:102584. doi.org/10.1016/j.pneurobio.2024.102584. [IF 6.7]
- Zhou T, Kawasaki K, Suzuki T, Hasegawa I, Roe AW*, Tanigawa H* (2023) Mapping information flow between the inferotemporal and prefrontal cortices via neural oscillations during memory retrieval and maintenance. Cell Reports 42(10):113169. doi.org/101016/j.celrep.2023.113169. [IF 8.8]
- Pan L*, Ping A, Schriver KE, Roe AW**, Zhu JM**, Xu KD** (2023) Infrared neural stimulation in human cerebral cortex. Brain Stimulation, S1935-861X(23)01680-7. https://doi.org/10.1016/j.brs.2023.01.1678. [IF 8.955]
- Hu JM, Roe AW (2022) Functionally specific and sparse domain-based micro-networks in monkey V1 and V2. Curr Biol, 32(13):2797-2809.e3. https://doi.org/10.1016/j.cub.2022.04.09 [IF 10.9]
- Zaraza D*, Chernov MM*, Yang Y, Rogers JA, Roe AW**, Friedman RM** (2022) Head mounted optical imaging and stimulation system for use in behaving primates. Cell Reports Methods, 2(12):1-13. https://doi.org/10.1016/j.crmeth.2022.100351. [IF 9.995]
- Zhu L, Wang M, Fu P, Liu Y, Zhang H, Roe AW**, Xi W** (2022) Precision 1070 nm Ultrafast Laser-Induced Photothrombosis of Depth-Targeted Vessels In Vivo. Small Methods. 7(1):e2200917. doi: 10.1002/smtd.202200917. [IF 15.637]
- Zhang H*, Fu P*, Liu Y*, Zheng Z, Zhu L, Wang M, Abdellah M, He M, Qian J, Roe AW**, Xi W** (2022) Large-depth three-photon fluorescence microscopy imaging of cortical microvasculature on nonhuman primates with bright AIE probe In vivo. Biomaterials. 289:121809. doi.org/10.1016/j.biomaterials.2022.121809. [IF 15.304]
- Shi S*, Xu AG*, Rui YY, Romanski LM, Gothard KM, Roe AW** (2021) Infrared neural stimulation with 7T fMRI: a rapid in vivo method for mapping cortical connections of primate amygdala. Neuroimage, 231, 117818. 2021 Feb 3;117818. doi: 10.1016/j.neuroimage.2021.117818. [PMID 33548458] [IF 7.12]
- Zhang X*,**, Zhang J*, Gao Y*, Qian M*, Qu S, Quan Z, Yu M, Chen X, Wang Y**, Pan G, Adriany G, Roe AW (2021) A 16-channel Dense Array for in vivo Animal Cortical MRI/fMRI on 7T Human Scanners. IEEE Trans Biomed Eng. 68(5):1611-1618. DOI:10.1109/TBME.2020.3027296. [PMID 32991277] [IF 4.538]
- Hu J*, Song XM, Wang Q, Roe AW** (2020) Curvature domains in V4 of Macaque Monkey. Elife. 9:e57261. doi: 10.7554/eLife.57261. [PMC7707819][PMID 33211004] [IF 7.08]
- Friedman RM*, Chehade NG, Roe AW, Gharbawie OA** (2020) Optical imaging reveals functional domains in primate sensorimotor cortex. Neuroimage, 221:117188. DOI: 10.1016/j.neuroimage.2020.117188. [PMID 32711067][PMC 7841645] [IF 6.076]
- Hu J*, Qian M, Tanigawa H, Song XM, Roe AW** (2020) Focal electrical stimulation of cortical functional networks. Cerebral Cortex. bhaa136, https://doi.org/10.1093/cercor/bhaa136. [PMID 32483588] [IF 4.98]
- Friedman RM*, Morone K, Gharbawie OA, Roe AW** (2020) Mapping mesoscale cortical connectivity in monkey sensorimotor cortex with optical imaging and microstimulation. J Comp Neurol. 528(17):3095-3107. doi:10.1002/cne.24918. [PMC 7541397][PMID 32255200] Cover figure. [IF 3.215]
- Ashaber M, Zalányi L, Pálfi E, Stuber I, Kovács T, Roe AW, Friedman RM, Négyessy L (2020) Synaptic organization of cortico-cortical communication in primates. Eur J Neurosci, 52(9):4037-4056. doi: 10.1111/ejn.14905. [PMID 32654301] [IF 3.386]
- Mekbib DW*, Han JW, Zhang L, Fang S, Jiang HJ, Zhu JM, Roe AW**, Xu DR** (2020) Virtual reality therapy for upper limb rehabilitation in patients with stroke: a meta-analysis of randomized clinical trials. Brain Injury. 34(4):456-465. [PMID 32064964] [IF 1.837]
- Li M*, Song XM*, Xu T, Hu D*, Roe AW**, Li C-Y** (2019) Subdomains within orientation columns of primary visual cortex Science Advances, 5(6):eaaw0807. DOI: 10.1126/sciadv.aaw0807. [**co-first author, *co-corresponding] [PMC: 6551190][PMID 31183405] [IF 13.117]
- Chen LM, Friedman RM, Roe AW (2003) Optical imaging of a tactile illusion in Area 3b of primary somatosensory cortex. Science 302:881-885. [PMID 14500850]

== See also ==
- Women in science
