= Brompton (Fredericksburg, Virginia) =

Historic house in Virginia, United States

- U.S. National Register of Historic Places
- Virginia Landmarks Register
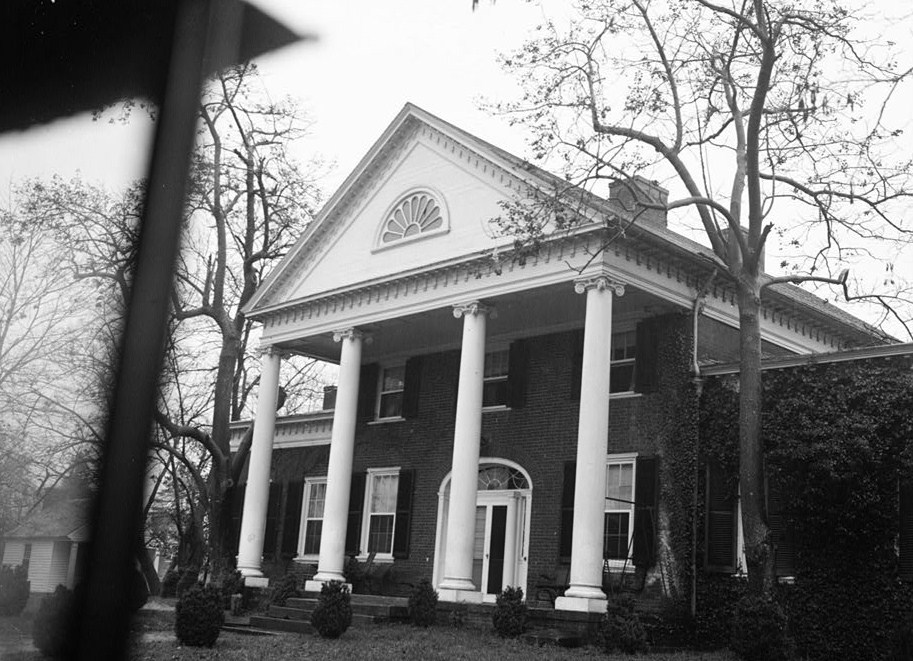
- Brompton, Sunken Road & Hanover Street (Fredericksburg, Virginia)

- Location within Northern Virginia Location within Virginia Location within the United States
- Location: Hanover St. and Sunken Rd., Fredericksburg, Virginia
- Coordinates: 38°17′44″N 77°28′13″W
- Area: 11 acres (4.5 ha)
- Built: 1820
- Architectural style: Roman Revival
- NRHP reference No.: 79003279
- VLR No.: 111-0008

Significant dates
- Added to NRHP: July 24, 1979
- Designated VLR: May 15, 1979

Brompton, originally known as Marye House, is an historic house located on heights overlooking the town of Fredericksburg, Virginia. The house was built in 1838 by John Lawrence Marye. The house was added to the National Register of Historic Places in July 1979.

The house sits atop an area of Fredericksburg known as 'Marye's Heights'. The town was about 400 yards from Brompton and was a Confederate stronghold against repeated Union Army assaults on the slope during the Battle of Fredericksburg (1862–1863). Confederate General James Longstreet maintained his headquarters at Brompton.

Brompton currently serves as the residence of the President of the University of Mary Washington. Previous residents have included the architect P. Thornton Marye, who was raised at the house.
