= Kemper Military School =

Coordinates: 38.97141702°N 92.74689317°W

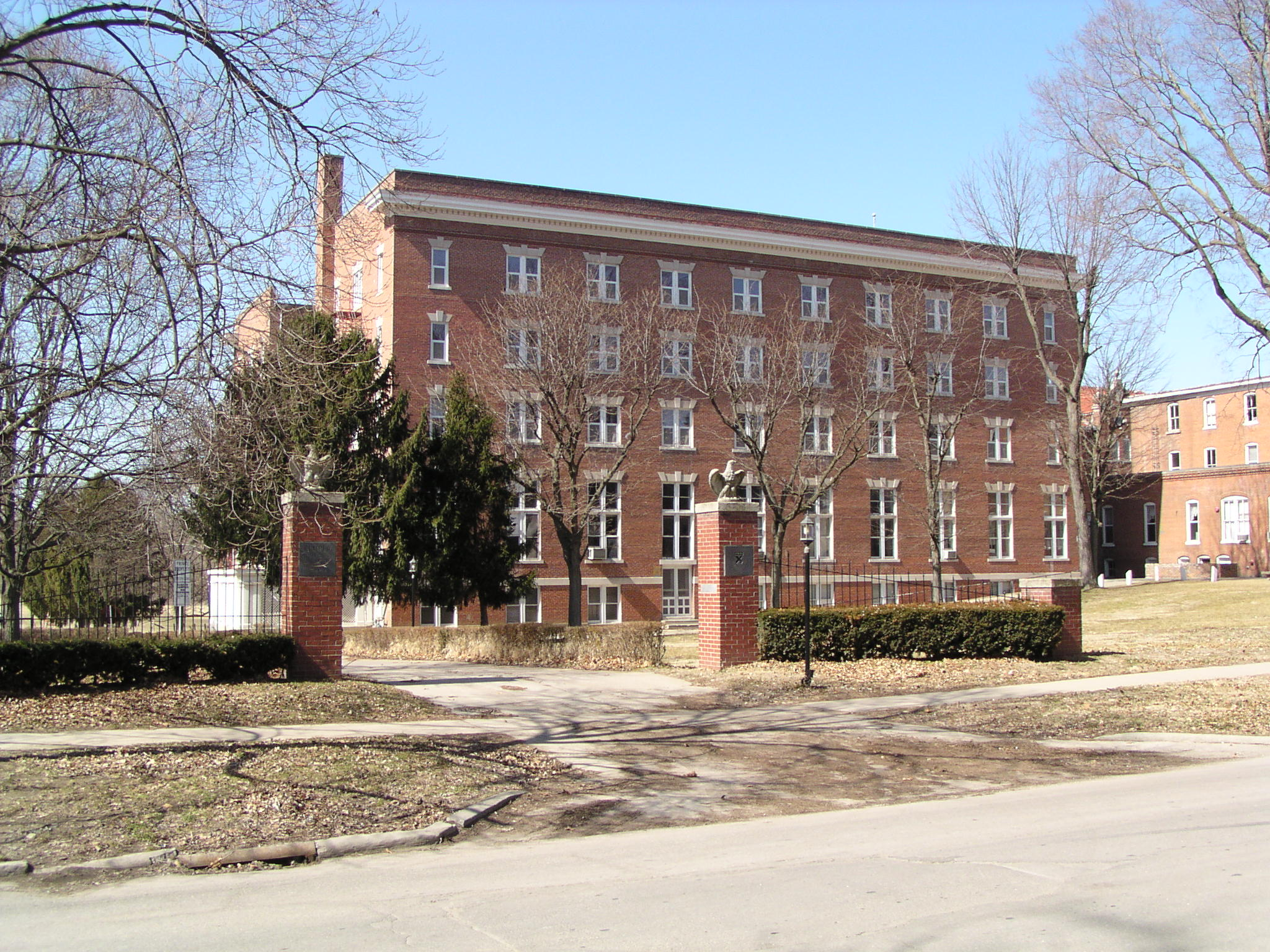
- Kemper Military School in 2010

Location
- 616-698 3rd Street; Boonville, Missouri; United States

Information
- Type: Military, private
- Motto: Nunquam Non Paratus
- Established: 1844
- Founder: Frederick T. Kemper
- Status: Permanently closed
- Closed: 2002
- Gender: Co-ed
- Campus: Rural
- Colors: Black & yellow
- Rival: Wentworth Military Academy and College
- Newspaper: The Kemper News
- Yearbook: Haversack, Bracer, Taps (1986-2002)

Kemper Military School & College was a private military school in Boonville, Missouri. Founded in 1844, the school grew to a 46-acre campus that was key to Boonville's identity as a 19th-century Missouri river town. Its motto was "Nunquam Non Paratus" (Never Not Prepared). The school filed for bankruptcy and closed in 2002.

Several school buildings are among Boonville's 400-plus antebellum and other architectural sites on the National Register of Historic Places. The core historic buildings are included in Historic District A.

== History ==
=== Early years under Frederick T. Kemper ===
On June 3, 1844, Frederick T. Kemper (1816–1881) gave his first lesson at the “Boonville Boarding School”, an all-male school designed to educate the sons of the frontier West. It started as a one-room schoolhouse on the corner of Spring and Main streets, and opened with five students. By the fall of 1844, it had 50 students. Kemper built the south wing of the administration building in 1845, and used the site as a boarding school and as classroom space. Operating the school essentially by himself, Kemper changed the school's name quite regularly. From 1844 through 1899, it was known variously as the Boonville Boarding School, Male Collegiate Institute, Kemper Family School, Kemper & Taylor Institute, and the Kemper School. In 1856, Kemper closed the school when he accepted a teaching and administrative position at Westminster College in Fulton, Missouri.

In 1861, Kemper returned to Boonville and reopened the school as the “Kemper & Taylor Institute” with his wife's brother, Edwin H. Taylor. It was one of only a few schools in the state to remain open during the Civil War, partly due to Kemper's willingness to accept female students. Kemper chose to keep a guarded neutrality throughout the war. However, it was widely known that his brother was Confederate General James L. Kemper, who gained fame as a primary participant in Pickett's Charge at the Battle of Gettysburg, and later became governor of Virginia. Kemper graduates fought on both sides during the war, and many participated in the local Battle of Boonville. After the war, Taylor left and the school again became all-male. Kemper continued to run the school, known again as "Kemper Family School", until his death in 1881.

=== Switch to a military school ===
Kemper's successor, alumnus Thomas A. Johnston, guided the school through its largest period of growth and established its national reputation. He was known as the "Builder of the School", and oversaw its change to a military school.

Kemper students had been required to wear West Point-style grey uniforms to promote a "feeling of equality" among the students since at least the early 1870s. Kemper's 1873 school catalogue also indicated that the school had hired a "Drill Master" to oversee the military side of the operations, but Johnston wanted to go a step further. By the mid-1880s, Johnston became "carried away with the idea...that military training for boys and future citizens had great educational value", according to Colonel A.M. Hitch's Centennial History of Kemper. "He adopted a military training program and structure in 1885, employing as military instructor a recent graduate of Virginia Military Institute, and from that day to this, the military feature has been a prominent one in Kemper life." The school changed its name to Kemper Military School in 1899, and began to advertise itself as "The West Point of the West".

During the 1880s, five other schools in Missouri added formal military training to their operation.

Kemper's most famous alumnus, Will Rogers, attended the school in the 1890s. Rogers went on to gain worldwide fame as an actor, humorist, political commentator and performer.

=== Era of growth ===
The campus expanded from 1900 to 1925. The major growth in the physical plant began in 1904 when "B" barracks was enlarged, then "Math Hall" was built in 1906 (originally as a gymnasium), "A" Barracks (or Harvey Barracks) was erected in 1909, "D" Barracks in 1917, and the Johnston Field House and the indoor pool were constructed in 1924.

There was a corresponding growth in enrollment. During F.T. Kemper's era, the school usually had around 50 students. By 1900, enrollment was around 100, and by 1915, it was up to 150. During World War I, enrollment soared, peaking at 502 students in 1918 – almost more than the school could handle. During the 1920s, enrollment remained strong, in the mid-300s.

Many traditions were established. The Kemperite was first published in 1912. Kemper's Standard of Honor was introduced in 1915. A formal ROTC program was begun in 1916, and in 1923, a junior college was added. By that time, the annual football game with rival Wentworth Military Academy and College in Lexington, Missouri, had become a huge event on Thanksgiving, with both corps of cadets boarding trains and sometimes meeting on a neutral field in Sedalia or Marshall, Missouri. The Kansas City and St. Louis newspapers referred to the gridiron battle as the “Little Army-Navy Game”, and gave front-page coverage to the outcome.

=== From the Great Depression to post-World War II prosperity ===
In 1928, Colonel Johnston announced his retirement and his successor: Colonel Arthur M. Hitch, his son-in-law and principal since 1907. Hitch ably guided the school through the severe financial crisis of the Great Depression, when enrollment plummeted, and into World War II, during which the school operated year-round with over 500 students. During Hitch's presidency, the new stadium and football fields were constructed in 1937, Academic Hall was built in 1939, and Science Hall was added in 1941. Colonel A.M. Hitch retired in 1948 and selected the son of Colonel T. A. Johnston, Colonel Harris Johnston, as the new superintendent. Johnston served for eight years, until 1956.

=== Decline ===
Kemper Military School survived the Mexican–American War, Civil War, Spanish–American War, World War I, World War II, Korean War and Vietnam War, and lasted into the 21st Century.

In 1956, the school went nonprofit, and the leadership of the school passed from the "Old Guard" and became much less stable. In the first 112 years of Kemper's history only four men had led the school. After 1956, no Superintendent served for more than a few years. Major General Joseph P. Cleland, a 1921 Kemper graduate, became superintendent in 1956, the Reverend Sam West in 1959, Frederick J. Marston in 1962, Colonel James P. Kelly in 1964, Dr. Joseph B. Black in 1969, Colonel Carroll S. Meek in 1973, Wilbur Windsor in 1974, General William H. Blakefield in 1976, General Loyd P. Rhiddlehoover in 1980, Colonel Frank Duggins in 1984, Colonel Roger Harms in 1985, Charles W. Stewart in 1993, and Edward Ridgley in 1999.

The unstable management hurt most in the early 1970s, when many military schools struggled because of double-digit inflation and anti-military backlash caused by the Vietnam War. Enrollment, which peaked at 544 students in the mid-1960s, bottomed out when just 89 cadets showed up in 1976. The school piled up debt, but was able to keep its doors open. The school employed different tactics to get enrollment up, including admitting female cadets in the 1970s, reviving junior college football in the 1980s, and instituting more liberal admissions policies. Kemper seemed to be on the upswing for brief periods during the 1980s and the 1990s.

In 2000, Kemper shut down the junior college and its expensive athletic program. The junior college football team, in particular, was a big money loser for the school, but achieved great on-field success and actually produced a number of NFL players, including Jamal Williams, long-time Pro Bowl defensive tackle for the San Diego Chargers, and future Green Bay Packers Torrance Marshall, the MVP of the 2001 Orange Bowl for the National Champion Oklahoma Sooners. For many years, Kemper was also one of six military junior colleges that participated in the Army's two-year Early Commissioning Program (ECP), an Army ROTC program through which a qualified student could earn a commission as a second lieutenant after only two years of college. At one time, ECP was Kemper's signature program, but it had to be cut with the rest of the junior college. Ridgley tried to rebuild Kemper through the high school, but by 2002, enrollment was down to 124 students and the school could no longer pay its bills.

On May 31, 2002, 158 years after Frederick T. Kemper taught his first class at the Boonville Boarding School, the flag was lowered for the final time and Kemper Military School was closed.

== School records ==
After Kemper closed in 2002, the City of Boonville donated the school's records to the State Historical Society of Missouri-Columbia Research Center. Access to student records is restricted due to privacy laws. Former students can request transcript via the center's website.

As of 2012 a small building (named the Library Learning Center) was renovated and used by State Fair Community College for people pursuing an associate's degree or a high school equivalency diploma. SFCC remodeled the large northernmost building (named Science Hall) starting in 2015. As of 2019, SFCC-Boonville operations were moved out of the Library building and into Science Hall, using three of the four floors. The Boonslick Regional Library made plans beginning in 2019 to move into the Library Learning Center and transferred ownership of the property from the City in 2023. Expected date of move in is 2024.

== Buildings and grounds ==
In 1983, the campus was added to the National Register of Historic places as Historic District A. The district includes 15 contributing buildings.

In 2003, the contents of the school were auctioned, and the school was sold as a parcel. The Kemper facilities were purchased by the City of Boonville and named "Frederick T. Kemper Park". The park contains 46 acres (190,000 m^{2}) and ten buildings on the former Kemper campus. The city has plans to retain ownership of the T.A. Johnston Field House and of 30 acres (120,000 m^{2}) of open space. Johnston Field House is home to the Boonslick Heartland YMCA and contains a cardio theater, weight room, aerobics room, 25-yard (23 m) indoor pool, indoor batting cage, office space and five basketball courts. The park also contains a regulation football field, soccer fields, a lake and three baseball fields. The city hopes to repair and put into use the five tennis courts. Additional development will be deferred until a master plan is developed after the best use of the space has been determined. The remainder of the core campus is being marketed by Boonville's Industrial Development Authority.

In 2005 a group associated with the Utah-based World Wide Association of Specialty Programs and Schools made an offer to buy the campus to open a new school for adolescents needing help with discipline, responsibility and leadership skills. Boonville City Council rejected the proposal.

On April 6, 2010, a tower connected to the old administration building collapsed to the ground, damaging at least one wall of the administration building as well as the roof. The City of Boonville has attempted to salvage as many bricks and ornaments as possible but has no plans to rebuild the tower.

In 2016 the Administration Building, deemed too costly to repair, was torn down after extensive documentation and preservation efforts to record historical information and save as many artifacts as possible. As of 2025 the ground where the Administration Building once stood is green space.

== Movies and photography at Kemper ==
At one time, Kemper was asked to be the location to shoot the movie National Lampoon's Animal House. Kemper turned down the offer. In 1981, the makers of Taps made an offer to shoot the movie at Kemper. The president at the time, General Blakefield, declined the request, despite the financial opportunity it presented for Kemper, stating that "it portrayed the military school student as a radical." In 1986, Combat Academy was filmed on campus.

Also in 1986, the Kemper campus and students were photographed as part of best-selling Day in the Life of America photography book. Photographer Nina Barnett's picture of the pool was featured in a two-page spread in the book and helped launch her career as a freelance photographer.

Since the campus has a 19th-century feel, it has been used as the setting for a number of movies. The motion pictures Combat High and Child's Play 3 were filmed at the school with cadets and instructors serving as extras. The school depicted in Child's Play 3 was reputedly modeled after Kemper itself.

In September and October 2007, Kemper's abandoned campus was used for location shots for the movie Saving Grace, which is about a little girl's trip back to Boonville in the summer of 1951, during the Great Flood of 1951. Many downtown Boonville buildings were also used for filming, with Kemper the setting for an asylum. The movie, released in 2008, was directed by Connie Stevens and stars Penelope Ann Miller, Tatum O'Neal, Joel Gretsch, Piper Laurie and Michael Biehn.

== Name history ==
- Boonville Boarding School, 1844–1845
- Boonville Male Collegiate Institute, 1845-1854
- Kemper Family School, 1854-1856
- Kemper and Taylor's Institute, 1861-1865
- Kemper's Family School, 1865–1874
- Kemper Family School, 1874-1896
- Kemper School, 1896-1899
- Kemper Military School, 1899-1923
- Kemper Military School and College, 1923–2000
- Kemper Military School, 2000–2002

== Presidents and superintendents ==
- Frederick T. Kemper, 1844–1856, 1861–1881
- Thomas A. Johnston, 1881–1928
- Colonel Arthur M. Hitch, 1928-1948
- Colonel Harris Johnston, 1948-1956
- Major General Joseph P. Cleland, 1956-1959
- Reverend Sam West, 1959-1962
- Frederick J. Marston, 1962-1964
- Colonel James P. Kelly, 1964-1969
- Doctor Joseph B. Black, 1969-1972
- Colonel Carroll S. Meek, 1973-1974
- Wilbur Windsor, 1974-1976
- General William H. Blakefield, 1976-1980
- General Loyd P. Rhiddlehoover, 1980-1984
- Colonel Frank Duggins, 1984–1985.
- Colonel Roger Harms, 1985–1993
- Charles W. Stewart, 1993–1999
- Ed Ridgley, 1999–2002

== Notable alumni ==
=== Arts, entertainment and popular culture ===
- Robert Clarke - "B" movie actor, best known for cult movie The Hideous Sun Demon
- George Lindsey – actor best known for role as Goober Pyle on The Andy Griffith Show
- Henry Lee McFee – American cubist painter
- Hugh O'Brian – actor, star of The Life and Legend of Wyatt Earp
- Frank O'Rourke - author
- Steve Railsback – actor, star of Helter Skelter and The Stunt Man
- Addison Randall - actor in cowboy "B" movies in the 1930s and '40s
- Will Rogers – humorist, actor (attended 1897–1898)
- Johnny Stompanato – Mobster boyfriend of actress Lana Turner, killed by Turner's daughter. Depicted in L.A. Confidential (film).

=== Politics ===
- Adam Benjamin, Jr., U.S. Congressman from Indiana, 1977–1982
- John Chilton Burch, U.S. Congressman from California, 1859–1861
- Dan Houx, member of the Missouri House of Representatives
- Harold Lane, State Representative District 58 of the State of Kansas 2003–2014
- Emil Lockwood, Majority Leader in the Michigan Senate
- John B. McCuish - Republican, 34th Governor of the state of Kansas
- William Neff Patman, U.S. Congressman from Texas, 1981–1985
- Lawrence Vest Stephens, Governor of Missouri 1897–1901

=== Business ===
- James E. Stowers, founder of American Century Investments and the Stowers Institute for Medical Research
- Donald J. Tyson, former president and CEO of Tyson Foods

=== Military ===
- Sergeant Travis W. Atkins, Medal of Honor, United States Army
- Major General Edward B. Giller, United States Air Force
- Lieutenant General Charles R. Hamm - eleventh Superintendent of the United States Air Force Academy
- Major General William P. T. Hill, United States Marine Corps
- Major General Thomas R. Tempel, United States Army
- Brigadier General Dennis Rogers, United States Army
- Private Joseph T. White, United States Army defector to North Korea
- Private First Class David F. Winder, Medal of Honor, United States Army

=== Academia ===
- Willis Henry Bocock, dean of the University of Georgia Graduate School
- William Appleman Williams, historian, professor at Oregon State University
- Charles J. Hitch, Economist, Assistant Secretary of Defense, President of University of California, President of Resources for the Future

=== Athletics ===
- James Adkisson - NFL football player, Oakland Raiders
- Jason Brookins - NFL football player, Baltimore Ravens
- Tim Hall - NFL football player, Oakland Raiders
- Torrance Marshall - NFL football player, Green Bay Packers
- Jamal Williams - NFL football player, San Diego Chargers
