= Joseph Cleland =

Joseph Cleland may refer to:

- Joseph P. Cleland (1901–1975), American general
- Joseph Max Cleland (1942–2021), American politician
