= James L. Kemper =

Confederate general and American politician (1823–1895)

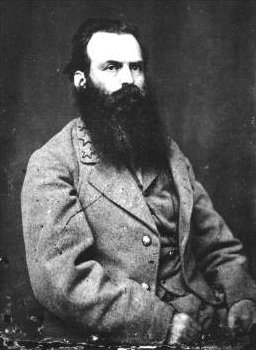
- Kemper (c. 1861–1865)

37th Governor of Virginia
- In office January 1, 1874 – January 1, 1878
- Lieutenant: Robert E. Withers; Henry Wirtz Thomas
- Preceded by: Gilbert Carlton Walker
- Succeeded by: Frederick W. M. Holliday

27th Speaker of the Virginia House of Delegates
- In office December 2, 1861 – September 7, 1863
- Preceded by: Oscar M. Crutchfield
- Succeeded by: Hugh W. Sheffey

Member of the Virginia House of Delegates from Madison County
- In office December 5, 1853 – September 7, 1863
- Preceded by: Morris D. Newman
- Succeeded by: William O. Fry

Personal details
- Born: James Lawson Kemper; June 11, 1823 Madison County, Virginia, U.S.
- Died: April 7, 1895 (aged 71) Orange County, Virginia, U.S.
- Party: Democratic (Before 1867, 1873–1895); Conservative Party of Virginia (1867–1873)
- Spouse: Cremora "Belle" Conway Cave (m.1855, d.1870)
- Children: 7
- Relatives: Frederick T. Kemper (brother)
- Education: Washington College
- Profession: Lawyer, Soldier, Politician

Military service
- Allegiance: United States; Virginia; Confederate States
- Branch/service: United States Army; Confederate States Army
- Years of service: 1846–1848 (USA); 1861–1865 (CSA)
- Rank: Captain (USV); Major General (CSA)
- Unit: Regiment of Virginia Volunteers (USA)
- Commands: 7th Virginia Infantry; Kemper's Brigade; Kemper's Division; Virginia Reserve Forces
- Battles/wars: Mexican–American War; American Civil War; First Battle of Bull Run; Battle of Seven Pines; Second Battle of Bull Run; Battle of Antietam; Battle of Gettysburg (WIA); Battle of Cold Harbor

James Lawson Kemper (June 11, 1823 – April 7, 1895) was an American lawyer, a Confederate general in the American Civil War, and the 37th Governor of Virginia. He was the youngest brigade commander and only non-professional general officer in the division that led Pickett's Charge, during which he was severely wounded.

== Early and family life ==
Kemper was born at Mountain Prospect plantation in Madison County, Virginia, the son of William and Maria Elizabeth (Allison) Kemper. His father's family had emigrated from near what became Siegen, Germany, in the early 18th century. His great-grandfather had been among the miners recruited for Governor Alexander Spotswood's colony at Germanna, Virginia, and his merchant father had moved to the new town of Madison Court House in the 1790s after his father had died falling from a horse in 1783, leaving his widow to take care of five daughters and a son. By the time young James was born, his paternal grandmother and four aunts also lived at the plantation William Kemper had bought for $5,541.40 in 1800.

His maternal great-grandfather, Col. John Jasper Stadler, had served on George Washington's staff as a civil engineer and planned fortifications in Maryland, Virginia, and North Carolina during the American Revolutionary War, and his grandfather John Stadler Allison served as an officer in the War of 1812 but died when his daughter Maria was very young. Although several of his paternal ancestors were involved in the German Reformed Church, William Kemper was an elder in the local Presbyterian church. His mother was devout but also hosted dances and parties that lasted several days. His brother, Frederick T. Kemper, later founded Kemper Military School.

James Kemper had virtually no military training as a boy. Still, his father and a neighboring planter, Henry Hill of Culpeper, founded Old Field School on the plantation to educate local children, including A.P. Hill, who became a lifelong friend. From 1830 to 1840, Kemper boarded during winters at Locust Dale Academy, which had a military corps of cadets. Kemper later attended Washington College (now Washington and Lee University) and also took civil engineering classes at nearby Virginia Military Institute. At Washington College's graduation ceremony in 1842, 19-year-old Kemper gave the commencement address, taking for a topic "The Need of a Public School System in Virginia." Kemper then returned home, where he joined a Tee-Total (Temperance) Society as well as studied law under George W. Summers of Kanawha County (a former U.S. Representative), after which Washington College awarded him a Master's degree in June 1845. He was admitted to the Virginia bar on October 2, 1846.

== Military and early political career ==
After Congress had declared war on Mexico in 1846, President James K. Polk called for nine regiments of volunteers. Kemper and his friend Birkett D. Fry of Kanawha County traveled to the national capital on December 15, 1846, hoping to secure commissions in the First Regiment of Virginia Volunteers. After traveling to Richmond and returning to Washington for more networking, Kemper learned he had been appointed the unit's quartermaster and captain. During the Mexican–American War, Kemper received favorable reviews and met many future military leaders, but his unit arrived just after the Battle of Buena Vista and mainly maintained a defensive perimeter in Coahuila province.

Honorably discharged from the U.S. Army on August 3, 1848, Kemper returned to practice law in Madison County and neighboring Orange and Culpeper Counties. He represented many fellow veterans making land claims, as well as speculated in real estate and helped form the Blue Ridge Turnpike Company (between Gordonsville and the Shenandoah Valley.

Interested in politics, Kemper first campaigned for office in 1850 but lost the contest to become clerk of the Commonwealth's constitutional convention. Promoting himself as proslavery, anti-abolitionist, and pro-states' rights, Kemper defeated Marcus Newman and was elected to represent Madison County in the Virginia House of Delegates in 1853 (the year his father died at age 76). A strong advocate of state military preparedness, as well as an ally of Henry A. Wise, Kemper rose to become chairman of the Military Affairs Committee. By 1858, he was serving as a brigadier general in the Virginia militia.

In late 1861, Kemper became Speaker, a position he held until September 1863. Much of his term as Speaker coincided with his service in the Confederate States Army.

== Civil War ==
After the start of the Civil War, Kemper served as a brigadier general in the Provisional Army of Virginia and then a colonel in the Confederate States Army, becoming head of the 7th Virginia Infantry. At First Bull Run, Kemper led the regiment as part of Jubal Early's brigade. His regiment was later assigned to Brigadier General A.P. Hill's brigade in Major General James Longstreet's division of the Confederate Army of Northern Virginia. On May 26, 1862, Hill was promoted to division command, and Kemper, as the ranking colonel, assumed command of the brigade. At the Battle of Seven Pines, Kemper's brigade attempted to relieve General D.H. Hill's battered troops but retreated from massed enemy artillery fire and did not engage the U.S. infantry. Nonetheless, Kemper was promoted to brigadier general on June 3. During the Seven Days Battles, Kemper's brigade was held in reserve at the Battle of Gaines's Mill. At the Battle of Glendale, the relatively inexperienced brigade spearheaded Longstreet's attack on the U.S. lines; before this, the only general engagement the brigade had faced took place during the Battle of Williamsburg almost two months earlier, when they had been under A.P. Hill's command. During the week-long confrontation, Kemper's brigade suffered the fewest losses out of Longstreet's six brigades. Following the Seven Days, General Robert E. Lee reorganized the army, and Kemper became a temporary division commander, commanding half of Longstreet's former division.

At the Second Battle of Bull Run, Kemper's division took part in Longstreet's surprise attack against the U.S. Army left flank, almost destroying Major General John Pope's Army of Virginia. Following Second Bull Run, the more senior Brigadier General David R. Jones took over command of the division, while Kemper reverted to brigade command. At the Battle of Antietam, Kemper was positioned south of the town of Sharpsburg, defending against Major General Ambrose E. Burnside's assault in the afternoon of September 17, 1862. He withdrew his brigade in the face of the U.S. advance, exposing the Confederate right flank. The line was saved only by the hasty arrival of A.P. Hill's division from Harpers Ferry.

Another army reorganization after Antietam led to Kemper's brigade being placed in a division commanded by Brigadier General George Pickett, who had been on medical leave since being wounded at Gaines Mill. The division was held in reserve at Fredericksburg, and during the spring of 1863, was on detached duty in the Richmond area. As a result, Kemper also missed the Chancellorsville Campaign.

At the Battle of Gettysburg, Kemper arrived with Pickett's division late on the second day of battle, July 2, 1863. His brigade was one of the central assault units in Pickett's Charge, advancing on the right flank of Pickett's line. After crossing Emmitsburg Road, the brigade was hit by flanking fire from two Vermont regiments, driving it to the left and disrupting the cohesion of the assault. Despite the danger, Kemper rose in his stirrups to urge his men forwards, shouting, "There are the guns, boys, go for them!"

This act of bravado made Kemper an obvious target, and he was wounded by a bullet in the abdomen and thigh before being captured by U.S. soldiers. However, he was rescued shortly after that by Sgt. Leigh Blanton of the First Virginia Infantry Regiment and carried back to the Confederate lines on Seminary Ridge. General Lee encountered Kemper being carried on a stretcher and inquired about the seriousness of his wound, which Kemper said he thought was mortal. He requested that Lee "do full justice to this division for its work today." During the Confederate Army's retreat from Gettysburg, Kemper was again captured by U.S. forces. He was exchanged (for Charles K. Graham) on September 19, 1863. For the rest of the war, he was too ill to serve in combat and commanded the Reserve Forces of Virginia instead. He was promoted to major general on September 19, 1864.

== Postbellum career ==
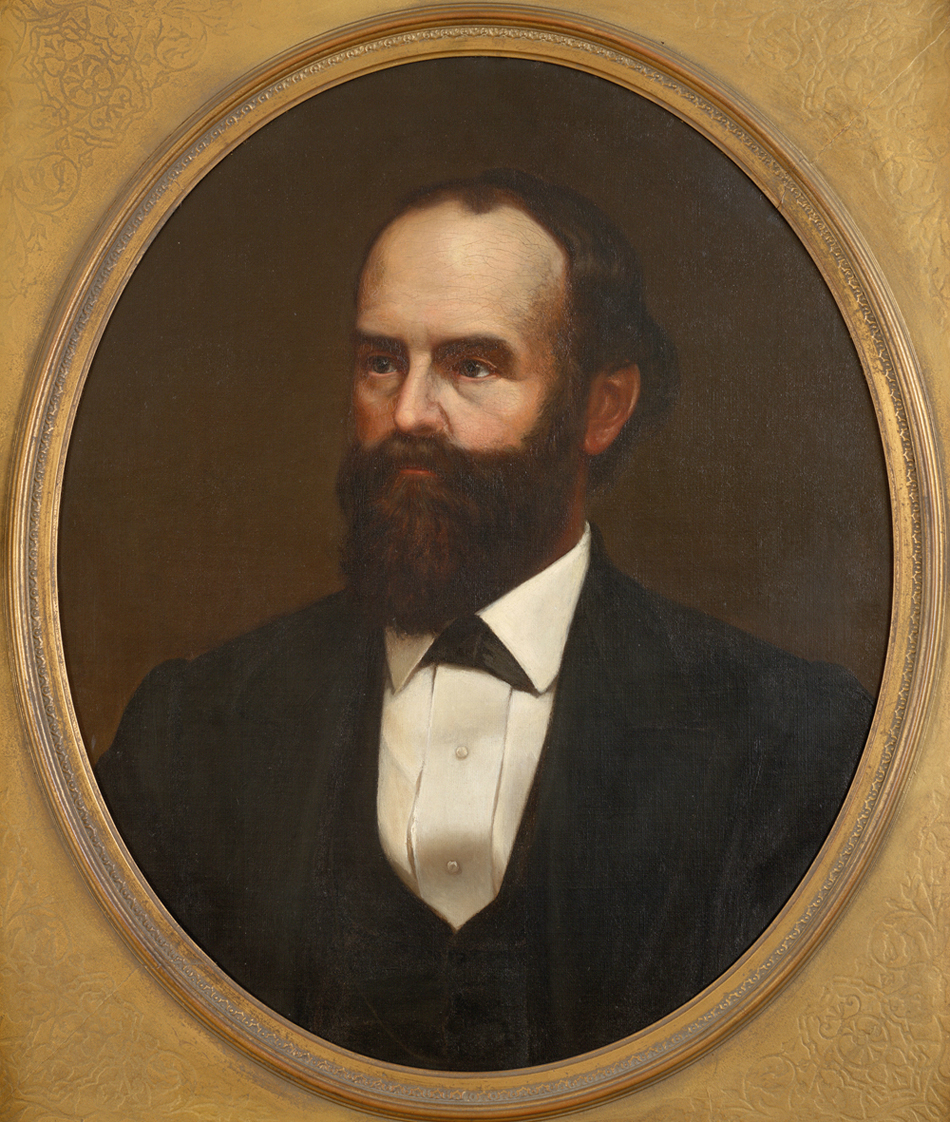
Portrait of Kemper, c. 1876

Kemper was paroled in May 1865. Since his previous house had been destroyed in a raid led by U.S. Army officer George Armstrong Custer, his mother-in-law purchased a house for the family in Madison County. Kemper then resumed his legal career. However, the bullet that had wounded him at Gettysburg had lodged close to a major artery and could not be removed without risking his life, so he suffered groin pain for the rest of his life. Nonetheless, he tried to attract northern capital to rebuild the devastated local economy. He and former classmate and Confederate general John D. Imboden also maintained a general legal practice, which included much bankruptcy law.

Beginning in 1867, Kemper helped found Virginia's Conservative Party, initially to oppose the new state constitution adopted by a convention chaired by John Underwood (who allied with the Radical Republican faction and opposed allowing former Confederates the vote, among other measures). In 1869 Kemper allied with another former Confederate general turned railroad entrepreneur William Mahone to elect Gilbert C. Walker to the Virginia House of Delegates.

After his wife Bella died in September 1870 of complications from the birth of their seventh child, Kemper's political activities increased. Distraught from the loss, he no longer slept in the house they had shared but in his law office. Kemper ran for Congress in the 7th Congressional District (after the redistricting caused by the 1870 census) but lost to incumbent John T. Harris of Harrisonburg.

In the 1873 election for Governor of Virginia, as the Reconstruction Era ended and former Confederate soldiers regained voting rights, Kemper handily defeated former Know-Nothing and fellow ex-Confederate turned Republican Robert William Hughes of Abingdon, who won only 43.84% of the votes cast. Kemper's supporters included former Confederate Generals Jubal Early and Fitzhugh Lee as well as Mahone and noted raider John Singleton Mosby. However, former Governor and Confederate General Henry A. Wise supported Hughes.

Kemper served as Virginia's Governor from January 1, 1874, to January 1, 1878. He lived frugally, using his son Meade (d. 1886) as his secretary. Kemper trimmed the state budget where possible and, late in his term, advocated taxing alcohol. One major political controversy involved whether to repay the state's war debt. Kemper allied with the Funder Party to pay it off; the Readjuster Party (which Mahone came to lead) opposed him. Gov. Kemper also enforced the civil rights provisions in the new state constitution, despite having opposed it originally. His February 1874 veto of a new law passed by the General Assembly that attempted to transfer control in Petersburg from elected officials (including African Americans) to a board of commissioners appointed by a judge was sustained by Virginia's Senate, although the law's proponents hanged him in effigy. General Early also vehemently disagreed with Kemper's 1875 decision to allow a militia unit of African Americans to participate in the dedication of a statue of General Stonewall Jackson. Gov. Kemper also attempted prison reform and built public schools despite budget shortages. His last major public reception, in October 1877, hosted President Rutherford B. Hayes, who opened the state fair in Richmond. One modern historian analogized Kemper's Conservative philosophy (and that of other Virginia Redeemers) to that of Gov. Wade Hampton of South Carolina.

== Death and legacy ==
As his term of office ended (the state Constitution forbidding his re-election), Kemper (with his six surviving children and various domestic animals) returned to farming and his legal practice. He sold the Madison County home and purchased a house known as Walnut Hills, which overlooked the Rapidan River and Blue Ridge Mountains and was near the Orange County courthouse. However, complications from the inoperable bullet worsened, and eventually paralyzed his left side. Kemper died on April 7, 1895, and was buried in the family cemetery.

Virginia erected a historical marker at Kemper's former home, which has now been restored by the Madison County Historical Society and other organizations, and is available for receptions and other activities. It is part of the Madison Courthouse historic district. His papers are held by the Library of Virginia.

Because Kemper (like Mahone) supported the education of African-Americans, some schools for African-Americans founded during his governorship were named after him, including Kemper School No. 4 in the Arlington District of Alexandria County, Virginia.

Also, the Kemper Street Industrial Historic District in Lynchburg, Virginia straddles the former Lynchburg and Durham Railroad, construction of which began in May 1887; the Norfolk and Southern Railroad acquired the line in 1898, which spurred that district's industrial growth.

== In popular media ==
Actor Royce D. Applegate portrayed Kemper in two films, Gettysburg (1993) and Gods and Generals (2003).

== See also ==
- List of American Civil War generals (Confederate)
- German-Americans in the Civil War

== Notes ==
Party political offices
Preceded by Gilbert Carlton Walker	Democratic nominee for Governor of Virginia; 1873	Succeeded by Frederick W. M. Holliday
Political offices
Preceded by Gilbert C. Walker	Governor of Virginia; 1874–1878	Succeeded by Frederick W. M. Holliday
Preceded by Oscar M. Crutchfield	Speaker of the Virginia House of Delegates; 1861–1863	Succeeded by Hugh W. Sheffey
