= Historic District A =

Historic district in Missouri, United States

- U.S. National Register of Historic Places
- U.S. Historic district
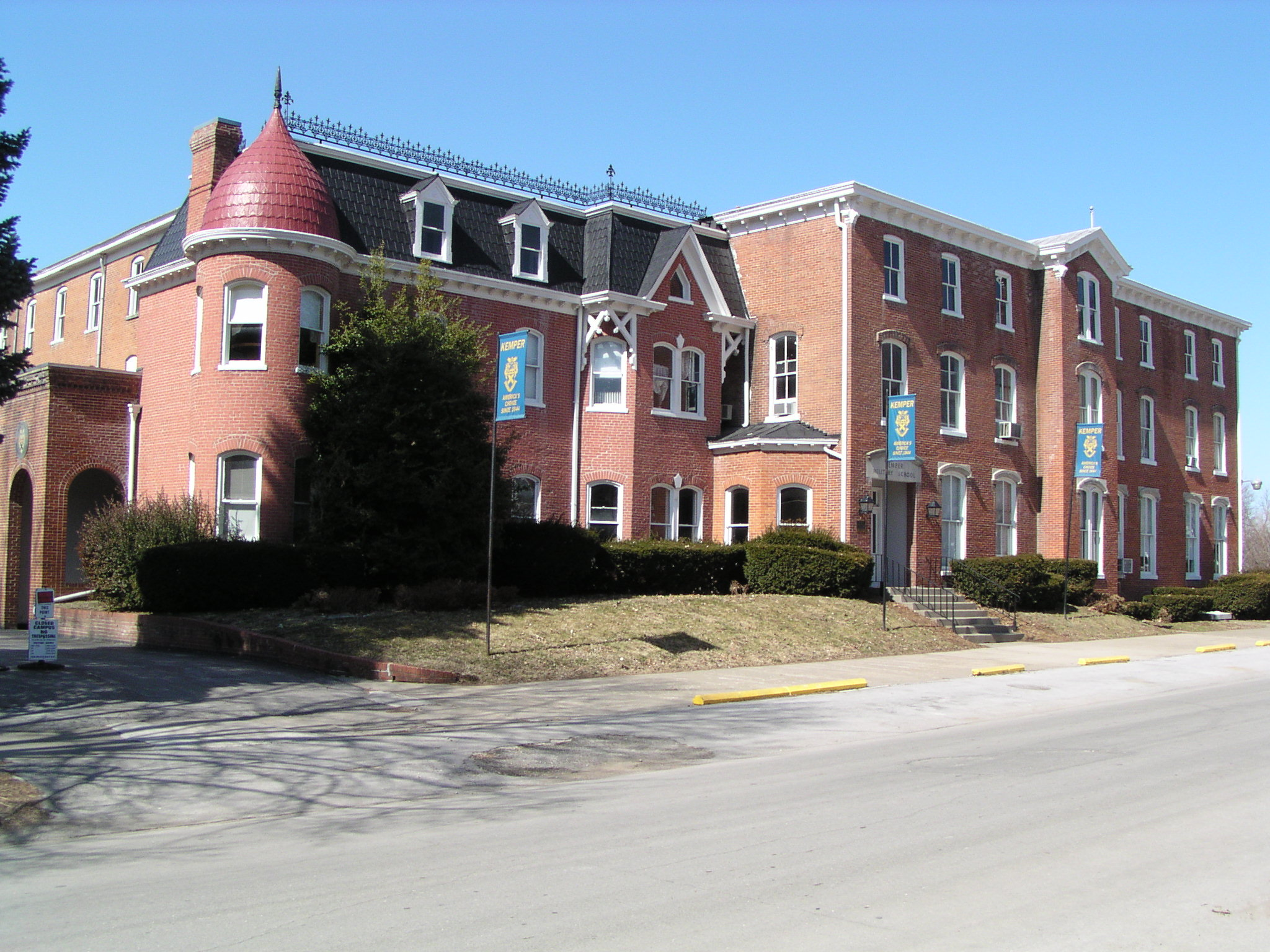

- Location within Missouri Location within the United States
- Location: Vine and 2nd Sts., Boonville, Missouri
- Coordinates: 38°58′15″N 92°44′48″W
- Area: 20.9 acres (8.5 ha)
- MPS: Boonville Missouri MRA
- NRHP reference No.: 83000979 (original); 100010553 (increase)

Significant dates
- Added to NRHP: January 24, 1983
- Boundary increase: July 24, 2024

Historic District A is a national historic district located at Boonville, Cooper County, Missouri. It encompasses 15 contributing buildings associated directly or indirectly with the Kemper Military School and College. The district includes the Kemper Administration Complex (1842-1904), "A" Barracks (1909), "D" Barracks (1916-1918), Johnston Field House and Pool Annex (1923-1925), Math Hall (1905-1906), Lamar Residence (1858-1860), Darby Residence (1858-1860), Dillender Residence (1895), Bertha Hitch Hall (c. 1854), and Kusgen-Melkersman Residence (1890-1910).

It was listed on the National Register of Historic Places in 1983.
