= American Century Investments =

American independent investment management firm

American Century Investments, Inc.

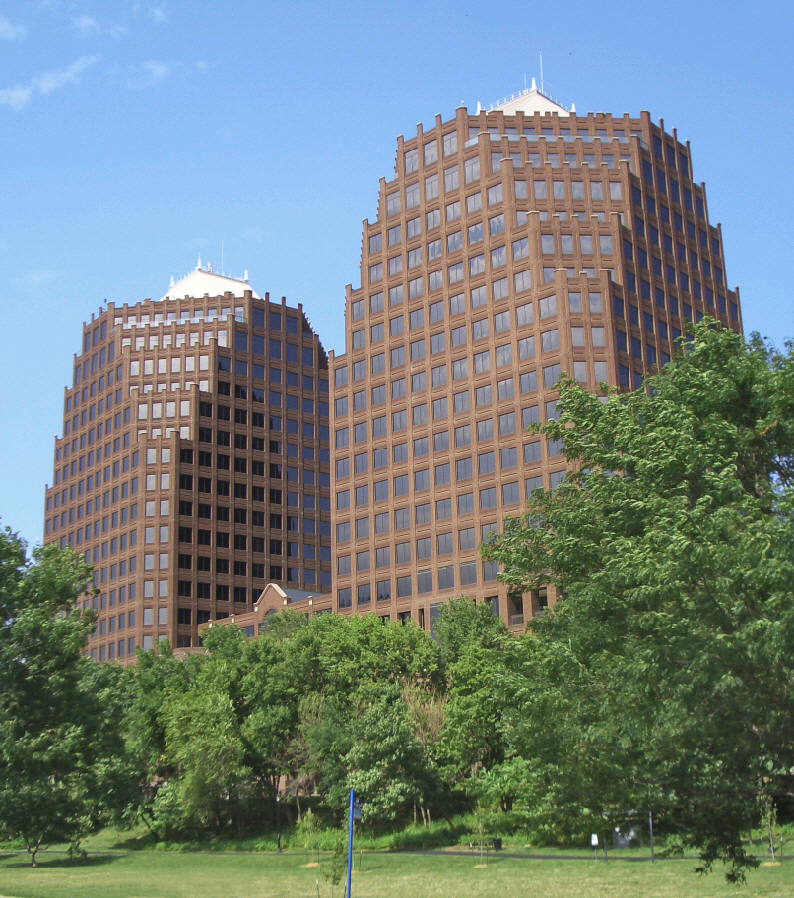
- American Century Towers, Kansas City, Missouri
- Type: Private
- Industry: Financial services
- Founded: Kansas City, Missouri, U.S. (1958; 68 years ago)
- Headquarters: Kansas City, Missouri, U.S.
- Key people: Jonathan Thomas, CEO and president James E. Stowers Jr., Founder
- Products: Mutual funds, institutional separate accounts, commingled trusts and sub-advisory accounts
- AUM: US$298 billion (2025)
- Number of employees: 1,400 (Q3 2022)
- Website: www.americancentury.com

American Century Investments is a privately controlled and independent investment management firm based in the United States.

== Operations ==
The company’s headquarters are located in Kansas City, Missouri, near the Country Club Plaza. The headquarters complex, known as American Century Towers, employs approximately 1,400 people. The firm also has offices in New York, London, Hong Kong, and Sydney.

== History ==
The company was founded by James E. Stowers Jr. in 1958 as "Twentieth Century Mutual Funds", a family of no-load funds, in Kansas City, Missouri. Stowers started the funds in 1958 with just $100,000 in assets from 24 shareholders. He built his business concentrating on small investors. The company changed its name to American Century Investments in 1997. American Century's headquarters are located at 4500 Main in Kansas City, Missouri, near the Country Club Plaza, and employs around 1,300 people.

In 2011, JP Morgan Chase sold their 41% stake in ACI to Toronto based bank CIBC. CIBC resold its stake to Nomura Holdings in 2015 for around $1 billion as it could not gain full control of ACI. The stake gave Nomura 10.1% of the voting rights. The Stowers Institute for Medical Research holds the controlling majority stake in the company. Between 2000 and 2019, the institute received over $1.1 billion in dividends from American Century.

The company paid a $1.5 million settlement to its current and former employees after the United States Department of Justice found that it broke anti-trust laws by conspiring with another company to not compete for employees. In August 2021, the company announced a vaccine mandate, requiring its employees to get the COVID-19 vaccine.

Since 1999, American Century has sponsored the American Century Championship, an annual celebrity golf tournament held at Edgewood Tahoe Resort in July. A fantasy golf contest was added to the championship in 2021.

In 2019, American Century Investments launched Avantis Investors, specializing in systematic, factor-based investment strategies. By December 2025, Avantis surpassed $100 billion in assets under management, and has expanded into the European market with the launch of several UCITS ETFs listed on the London Stock Exchange and Deutsche Börse.

== Subsidiary ==
- American Century Investment Management, Inc.
- American Century Investment Management (Asia Pacific) Limited
- American Century Investment Management (UK) Limited
- American Century Investment Services, Inc.
