= Thomas A. Johnston =

American educator (1848–1934)

Thomas A. Johnston (1848 – February 5, 1934), was president of the Kemper Family School and Kemper Military School in Boonville, Missouri, from 1881 to 1928. He was known as the "Builder of Kemper".

== Early life ==
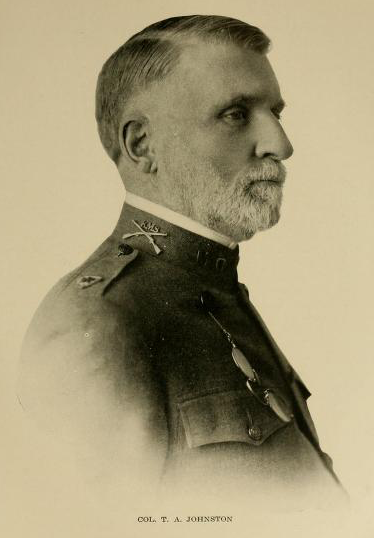
Johnston in a 1919 publication

Thomas A. Johnston was born in Cooper County, Missouri, in 1848.

Johnston joined the Confederate Army in October 1864, and served under General John Marmaduke and General Sterling Price through the end of the war. After the war, Johnston studied for two years at a private academy in Prairie Home, Missouri, before entering the Kemper Family School in fall 1867. He studied under Professor Frederick T. Kemper until 1871, then was admitted to the senior class of the University of Missouri and graduated with an A.B.

== Career ==
After graduating, Johnston returned to the Kemper School as an instructor. Following the death of the school founder in 1881, Johnston was named Kemper president and placed in control of the school. At one point, he was instructor of Latin at the University of Missouri.

Johnston changed the Kemper School into a military school, led it through its largest period of growth, and established its national reputation. In 1885, he added the military training program and structure to Kemper, then changed the name to Kemper Military School in 1899. It was advertised as the "West Point of the West".

Most of the buildings on campus were constructed during Johnston's tenure. He introduced the Standard of Honor in 1915, began a formal ROTC program in 1916, and added a junior college in 1923. He saw enrollment grow from around 60 in the 1880s and 1890s to 160 by 1910 to 517 in 1918. In the 1920s enrollment stayed steady at around 350 cadets. In 1928, Johnston announced his retirement as superintendent and selected Colonel Arthur M. Hitch to lead the school. Johnston continued as president of Kemper until his death. He was president and principal owner of the Kemper Military School Corporation.

== Personal life ==
Johnston had four children: Bertha, Rea Alexander, Harris Cecil and Alice Ewing. His daughter Alice married his successor Arthur M. Hutch. After Hitch retired in 1948, his son Harris was selected as the new superintendent.

Johnston died on February 5, 1934, at his apartment in Boonville. He was buried in Walnut Grove Cemetery.
