= 1873 Virginia gubernatorial election =

- May 27, 1873
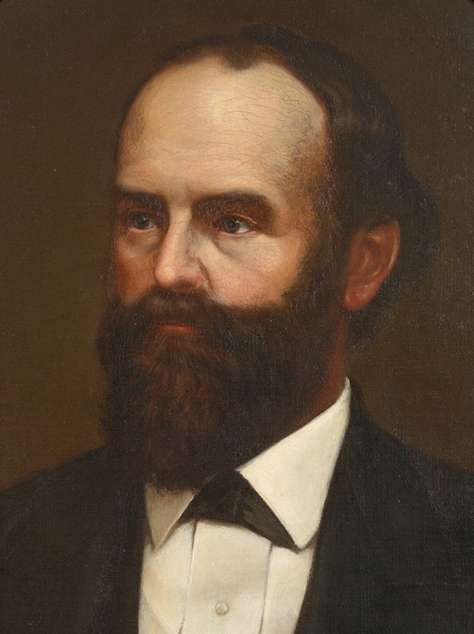

Nominee	James L. Kemper	Robert William Hughes
Party	Democratic	Republican
Popular vote	119,672	93,413
Percentage	56.16%	43.84%
- County results Kemper: 50–60% 60–70% 70–80% 80–90% >90% Hughes: 50–60% 60–70% 70–80%
Governor before election
Gilbert Carlton Walker
Democratic
Elected Governor
James L. Kemper
Democratic

The 1873 Virginia gubernatorial election was held on May 27, 1873, to elect the governor of Virginia.

== Results ==
Virginia gubernatorial election, 1873
Party	Candidate	Votes	%
Democratic	James L. Kemper	119,672	56.16%
Republican	Robert William Hughes	93,413	43.84%
Total votes		213,085	100.00%
Democratic hold			
