= Combat Academy =

1986 television film directed by Neal Israel

- Film poster
- Genre: Comedy
- Written by: Paul W. Shapiro
- Directed by: Neal Israel
- Starring: Keith Gordon; Wally Ward; George Clooney; Robert Culp; Jamie Farr; Richard Moll
- Music by: Robert Folk
- Country of origin: United States
- Original language: English

Production
- Executive producer: Frank von Zerneck
- Producer: Robert M. Sertner
- Cinematography: Steven Yaconelli
- Editors: Tom Finan; Mike Hill
- Running time: 96 minutes
- Production companies: Frank von Zerneck Films; Lynch/Biller Productions

Original release
- Network: NBC
- Release: November 23, 1986

Combat Academy (also known as Combat High) is a 1986 American comedy television film directed by Neal Israel. The film also features (a then-unknown) George Clooney.

== Synopsis ==
Best friends Max Mendelsson and Perry Barnett are a pair of misfit high school teenagers who always cause trouble at school. After starting the first day with a large amount of destructive pranks, the duo are suspended from school. They later get themselves into more trouble when they intentionally misdirect several construction workers into drilling on the wrong area, ultimately causing roadside damage and getting themselves arrested by the police. For their mischief, the judge sentences them to serve a year in Kirkland Military School to teach them discipline.

Upon arriving in military school, the duo meets Cadet Major Biff Woods, Cadet Captain Kevin, and Cadet Sergeant Andrea Pritchett, who constantly punish Max for his bad conduct and behavior. Max finds the time in military school unbearable and vows to find a way to get himself out. During a war game, Perry meets a fellow cadet named Mary-Beth and falls in love with her. Meanwhile, Max again sets up another series of destructive pranks in the military school, hoping to get himself removed from the school. However, the principal and Biff's father, General Ed Woods, refuse to expel them, instead giving the two of them more punishments. Although Max is still unrepentant, Perry decides that he wants to straighten up his life and breaks off his friendship with Max.

Max eventually wins the friendship of other cadets by saving a drowning cadet and defending him from Biff, while Perry begin a budding romance with Mary-Beth. Meanwhile, cadets from a Soviet military school visits Kirkland and challenges them to a mock war game as part of their tour. During the welcome party, Biff steals a pocket watch from a Soviet guest. Max notices this and confronts Biff for his actions, but the two are caught by the General in front of everyone. Although Max tries to take the blame, Biff confesses to General Woods that he was the thief. He announces that he did this in revenge for his father, always praising him as a fine soldier but never regarding him as a son. Saddened by this, the general relieves him of his command for the upcoming mock war. Biff tries to drown his sorrows by drinking, but Max, who has reconciled with Perry, decides to set another plan to help Biff make up with his father.

The war game begins with Captain Kevin leading, and before he departs, Max gave him a stolen battle plan of the Soviet cadets. However, the Kirkland cadets were led into a trap and starts losing, and Kevin realizes Max tricked him. He resorts to cheating (continuing to fight despite being shot in-game) in order win by any means necessary. The other cadets, led by Max, bring a sleeping Biff to the battle, and asks him for leadership. Biff was initially reluctant to command this war, but Max encourages him to, and the group manage to successfully capture a group of Soviet cadets. Andrea meets up and joins them, then she and Max share a kiss. Elsewhere, Kevin manage to defeat the Soviets, who accuse them of cheating and a fight breaks out. Max intervenes to stop the fight, telling all of them that this is not a real war, and this mutual hostility between them is pointless. The two countries should not be seeing each other enemies, and neither should they. Max's actions win the friendship and respect of the Soviets, and General Woods is happy at how Biff completed this mock war with a peaceful end, acknowledging him as his son.

The film ends with Perry leaving with Mary-Beth for Thanksgiving holiday; Max claims that he has changed his old ways, and asks Perry to burn a box with his old prank notebook. However, the box is actually full of fireworks, which gets set off when the workers burn it in front of the school gate. Max laughs at his final prank while the fellow cadets cheer and applaud him.

== Location ==
The movie was filmed at an actual military school, Kemper Military School and College of Boonville, Missouri, in 1986. Actual students and instructors served as extras and consultants during the shooting of the production.

== Cast ==
Actor	Role
Keith Gordon	Maxwell "Max" Mendelsson
Wally Ward	Percival "Perry" Barnett
George Clooney	Cadet Major Biff Woods
Robert Culp	General Edward "Ed" Woods
Jamie Farr	Colonel Frierick
Richard Moll	Colonel Felix Long Sr.
Dana Hill	Cadet Sergeant Andrea Pritchett
Kevin Haley	Cadet Capitan Kevin
Tina Caspary	Mary-Beth
Sherman Hemsley	Judge Daley
Bernie Kopell	Mr. Mendelsson
John Ratzenberger	Mr. Barnett
Dick Van Patten	Principal
Elya Baskin	Interpreter
Danny Nucci	Jai
David Ranyr	Winston

== Reception ==
Despite starring several popular actors such as Richard Moll and Jamie Farr, the film was both a commercial and critical failure. It was released on video cassette in the United States, and in the United Kingdom.
