= Robert William Hughes =

American judge

Judge of the United States District Court for the Eastern District of Virginia
- In office January 14, 1874 – February 22, 1898
- Appointed by: Ulysses S. Grant
- Preceded by: John Curtiss Underwood
- Succeeded by: Edmund Waddill Jr.

Personal details
- Born: January 16, 1821 Powhatan County, Virginia, U.S.
- Died: December 10, 1901 (aged 80) Abingdon, Virginia, U.S.
- Resting place: Sinking Springs Cemetery; Abingdon, Virginia
- Party: Democratic (until 1865); Republican (from 1865)
- Children: Robert M. Hughes
- Education: read law

Robert William Hughes (January 16, 1821 – December 10, 1901) was a Virginia newspaper editor, attorney and a United States district judge of the United States District Court for the Eastern District of Virginia.

== Education and career ==
Born on January 16, 1821, at Muddy Creek Plantation in Powhatan County, Virginia, Hughes was of an old Virginia family, whose ancestors came to the area of Powhatan County before 1700, when it was still Goochland County. He attended Caldwell Institute in Greensboro, North Carolina, then studied law in Fincastle, Virginia, and ultimately read law in 1846. He entered private practice in Richmond, Virginia from 1846 to 1853. He was editor of the Richmond Examiner from 1853 to 1857. He was editor of the Washington Union in Washington, D.C. from 1857 to 1861. He was again editor of the Richmond Examiner from 1861 to 1865. He was editor of the Richmond Republic from 1865 to 1866. He resumed private practice in Virginia from 1866 to 1869. He was editor of the Richmond State Journal from 1869 to 1870. He resumed private practice in Abingdon, Virginia from 1870 to 1871. He had some affiliation with some predecessors of the Norfolk and Western Railway. He was the United States Attorney for the Western District of Virginia from 1871 to 1873.

=== Newspaper editor ===
In connection with the statewide elections of 1855, Hughes editorialized against the Know Nothing movement in Virginia, pointing out that Yankees and abolitionists, not immigrants and Roman Catholics, were the true threats to the Southern way of life. "Why are Northern Abolitionists and Know Nothings persecuting and proscribing foreigners and Catholics?" he wrote. "It is because they have always refused to join with them in their outcry against slavery and the South." In 1857, Hughes left Richmond at the invitation of President James Buchanan to edit the Democratic newspaper, the Washington Union. His papers at the College of William & Mary include, among other things, a receipt for the purchase of two slaves in 1862. Hughes favored secession but was critical of the administration of Jefferson Davis.

== Post war political evolution ==
After the War, Hughes became "one of the first prominent Virginians to turn Republican during the Reconstruction period." Earlier, he "was an extreme secessionist, but after the war he became a moderate Republican and a favorite of President Grant, causing many of his old friends to consider him 'worse than a carpetbagger' and a 'Judas.'" He was an unsuccessful Republican candidate for Congress in 1870, losing to William Terry, and in 1872, losing to Tazewell County farmer Rees Bowen.

== Duel ==
In June, 1869, Hughes shot and wounded a rival newspaperman and future Governor of Virginia, William E. Cameron, in a duel, after Cameron had published a "scathing" editorial about the transformation of Hughes's political views. According to one account, "the parties met at Chester Station, on the Petersburg Railroad; but, before they could exchange a shot, the police made their appearance, and caused a flight of the parties. They passed into North Carolina, where they fought on June 12 with pistols. Cameron was hit in the breast at the first fire, the ball striking a rib and glancing. Hughes demanded another fire, but the surgeons declared that Cameron could not deliver another shot, and the affair ended 'to the satisfaction of all parties.'"

== Gubernatorial campaign ==
Hughes resigned as United States Attorney for the Western District of Virginia in 1873 for his unsuccessful campaign for Governor of Virginia, against James L. Kemper. At the Republican convention attended by white and black delegates, out of two candidates, "it was seen that Col. Hughes was the stronger man, especially among the colored delegates." In accepting the Republican nomination, Hughes gave a speech applauding the fairness of the Reconstruction amendments, and condemned his opponents for running on the slogan of "Virginia for White Virginians." "Colonel Robert W. Hughes, at the time of his nomination, was the strongest and most popular Republican in Virginia. . . . There are no Republicans in Virginia, and very few in the whole South, who can command the respect that Judge Hughes enjoys."

== Federal judicial service ==
Hughes was nominated by President Ulysses S. Grant on December 15, 1873, to a seat on the United States District Court for the Eastern District of Virginia vacated by Judge John Curtiss Underwood. He was confirmed by the United States Senate on January 14, 1874, and received his commission the same day. His service terminated on February 22, 1898, due to his retirement.

=== Notable cases ===
In 1879, in the case of Ex parte Kinney, 3 Hughes 9, 14 F.Cas. 602, Judge Hughes denied habeas corpus relief to a black petitioner who had married a white woman in Washington, D.C., then returned to Virginia, and was convicted under Virginia law of traveling out-of-state to marry and sentenced to five years of hard labor. "But the Kinney court went on to declare that Virginia could not enforce its law against nondomiciliaries nor exclude altogether interracial couples domiciled in the District of Columbia. 'That such a citizen would have a right of transit with his wife through Virginia, and of temporary stoppage, and of carrying on any business here not requiring residence, may be conceded, because these are privileges following a citizen of the United States . . . .'"

The same year, in the Arlington Estate case, Judge Hughes addressed the jurisdictional issues raised by Custis Lee's ejectment action to recover the family property, and concluded his opinion with these words: "If, then, it shall go up to the supreme court, as I doubt not it will do, I shall console myself with the memorable reflection of Lord Nottingham, in the case of the Duke of Norfolk: ‘I am not ashamed to have made this decision, nor will I be wounded if it should be reversed.'"

== Virginia Supreme Court speculation ==
In 1882, when a group of Republicans was seeking greater representation in governments, Hughes was mentioned as a possible member of a reconstituted Virginia Supreme Court.

== Death ==
Hughes died on December 10, 1901, near Abingdon. He was buried in Sinking Spring Cemetery, in Abingdon.

== Family ==
In 1850, at the Governor's mansion, Hughes married Joseph E. Johnston's niece, Eliza M. Johnston, who was the adopted daughter of then-Governor John B. Floyd. Hughes's son, Robert M. Hughes, was a distinguished Virginia lawyer, and one of the early Presidents of the Virginia Bar Association.

== Poe ==
During his earlier period practicing law in Richmond, Hughes was an acquaintance of Edgar Allan Poe.

== Virginian, writer and patron of education ==
During his judicial career, Judge Hughes lived in the Mowbray Arch section of the Ghent neighborhood, but kept a summer home near Abingdon.

His published works included five volumes of reports of federal court opinions. In addition, Hughes published biographies of Generals Floyd and Johnston. He was interested in economics, and published his comments on the American monetary system and matters of public finance in post-War Virginia. He also raised horses, including thoroughbreds registered with the American Jockey Club.

Hughes lectured on law at the University of Virginia, and served on its Board of Visitors from 1865 to 1872. He was also a trustee of the Hampton Institute, from 1870 to 1899. At the graduation exercises in 1875, Judge Hughes "said it was gratifying to put to rest the old belief that one race was inferior in capacity to the other."

In 1881, the College of William & Mary conferred on Judge Hughes an honorary doctor of law degree.

== Sources ==
- College of William & Mary, Swem Library, Inventory of the Robert William Hughes Papers 1818-1900
- New York Times Archives, Profile of Col. Robert W. Hughes, Republican nominee for Governor of Virginia (August 3, 1873)

Party political offices
Preceded by Henry H. Wells	Republican nominee for Governor of Virginia; 1873	Vacant Title next held by John Sergeant Wise
Legal offices
Preceded by John Curtiss Underwood	Judge of the United States District Court for the Eastern District of Virginia; 1874–1898	Succeeded by Edmund Waddill Jr.
