= Frederick T. Kemper =

American educator (1816–1881)

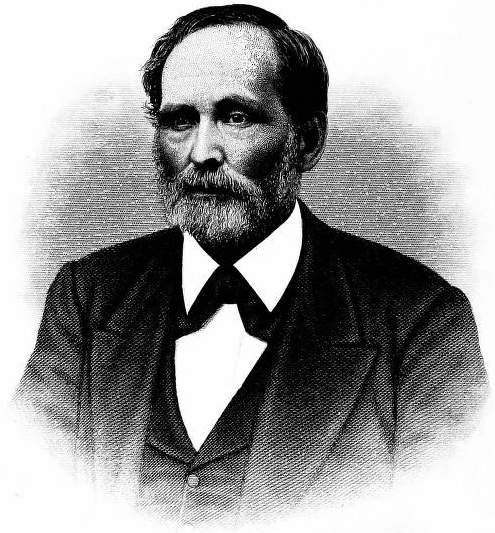
- Engraving of Kemper by H. B. Hall & Sons
- Born: 1816; Madison County, Virginia, U.S.
- Died: March 9, 1881 (aged 64–65); Boonville, Missouri, U.S.
- Resting place: Walnut Grove Cemetery
- Education: Marion College
- Known for: founding Kemper Military School
- Relatives: James L. Kemper (brother)

Frederick Thomas Kemper (1816 – March 9, 1881) was the founder of the school that later became Kemper Military School in Boonville, Missouri.

== Early life ==
Frederick Thomas Kemper was born in Madison County, Virginia, in 1816. His brother was General James L. Kemper, who gained fame at the Battle of Gettysburg, and later became Governor of Virginia. Kemper's early academic experiences were through private tutors and small schools in the Tidewater area of Virginia. He left the family farm in 1836 to complete his education at Marion College, near Palmyra, Missouri. He studied there for five years and graduated valedictorian in the class of 1841.

== Career ==
After graduating, Kemper remained at Marion for three years as an instructor. In 1843 he opened a private boarding school with his uncle in Philadelphia, Missouri. Residents of Boonville then induced Kemper to open a school there in the spring of 1844. In June 1844, he opened up "Boonville Male Boarding School". He operated the school by himself as a local school for boys, and regularly changed the school's name. From 1845 through 1856 it was referred to variously as the "New Boonville Academy", the "Boonville Boarding School and Teachers Seminary", "Male Collegiate Institute", and "Kemper Family School". In 1856, the school was temporarily closed when Kemper accepted a teaching and administrative position at the newly established Westminster College in Fulton, Missouri. However, in 1861 he returned to Boonville and reopened the school in partnership with his wife's brother, Edwin H. Taylor. The school was then called the "Kemper and Taylor Institute." Kemper kept a guarded neutrality and the schools was one of few in the state to remain open during the Civil War. After the war, Kemper and his wife Susan regained sole management of Kemper Family School until his death in 1881. In 1885, Kemper's successor, Thomas A. Johnston, added a formal military training program, and in 1899, the name of the school officially changed to Kemper Military School. The school continued to operate until 2002, when it shut its doors.

== Personal life ==
Kemper was an elder at the Presbyterian Church.

Kemper died of pneumonia on March 9, 1881, at his home in Boonville. He was buried in Walnut Grove Cemetery.
