= Tazewell Ellett =

American politician (1856–1914)

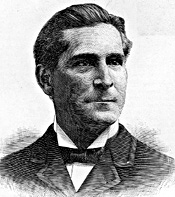

Member of the U.S. House of Representatives from Virginia's 3rd district
- In office March 4, 1895 – March 3, 1897
- Preceded by: George D. Wise
- Succeeded by: John Lamb

Personal details
- Born: January 1, 1856 Richmond, Virginia, U.S.
- Died: May 19, 1914 (aged 58) Summerville, South Carolina, U.S.
- Resting place: Hollywood Cemetery, Richmond, Virginia
- Party: Democratic
- Spouse: Josephine Lyons Scott
- Children: 3
- Education: Virginia Military Institute; University of Virginia (LLB)
- Profession: Lawyer

Tazewell Ellett (January 1, 1856 – May 19, 1914) was a one-term U.S. representative from Virginia from 1895 to 1897.

== Early life ==
Tazewell Ellett was born on January 1, 1856, in Richmond, Virginia, to Andrew L. Ellett. His father was a member of the dry goods firm Ellett, Waller, Drewry & Co. He attended private schools in Richmond, including Strother's school. He graduated from the Virginia Military Institute at Lexington in 1876. He graduated from the University of Virginia Law School with a Bachelor of Laws in 1878.

== Career ==
After graduating, Ellett practiced law in Richmond. After six months, he made a partnership with Francis Howe McGuire under the firm McGuire & Ellett. They worked together for 12 years. He served as member of the board of visitors of the Virginia Military Institute. He served in the First Virginia Regiment, serving initially as adjutant. He was elected captain of Company F. He attained the rank of lieutenant colonel.

In 1880, Ellett became a member of the Democratic committee in Richmond. He later became chairman of the committee for three years. From 1883 to 1888, he was chairman of the Congressional Democratic Committee of the Third District. He was an advisor to Senator John S. Barbour Jr. for two years. From 1884 to 1886, he was the Democratic canvasser-at-large for Virginia. In 1888, he served as a presidential elector for Grover Cleveland. In 1894, Ellett was elected as a Democrat to the Fifty-fourth Congress (March 4, 1895 – March 3, 1897) with 63.31% of the vote, defeating Republican J.W. Southward, Independents James M. Gregory, and Martin Meredith Lipscomb, and Progressive George M. Smithdeal. He was an unsuccessful candidate for reelection in 1896 to the Fifty-fifth Congress.

After Congress, he resumed the practice of law in Richmond, and New York City. Later in life, he engaged in promotion enterprises and mining prospects. He worked out of New York City and traveled to South America.

== Personal life ==
Ellett married Josephine Lyons Scott, daughter of Robert Eden Scott, of Fauquier County. He had two daughters and one son, Josephine, Heningham (Mrs. Pringle Smith) and Tazewell. His son Tazewell married the daughter of his law partner Francis Howe McGuire.

Ellett died on May 19, 1914, at the home of his daughter in Summerville, South Carolina. He was interred in Hollywood Cemetery, Richmond, Virginia.

U.S. House of Representatives
Preceded by George D. Wise	Member of the U.S. House of Representatives from Virginia's 3rd congressional district 1895–1897	Succeeded by John Lamb
