= Edmund Waddill Jr. =

American judge (1855–1931)

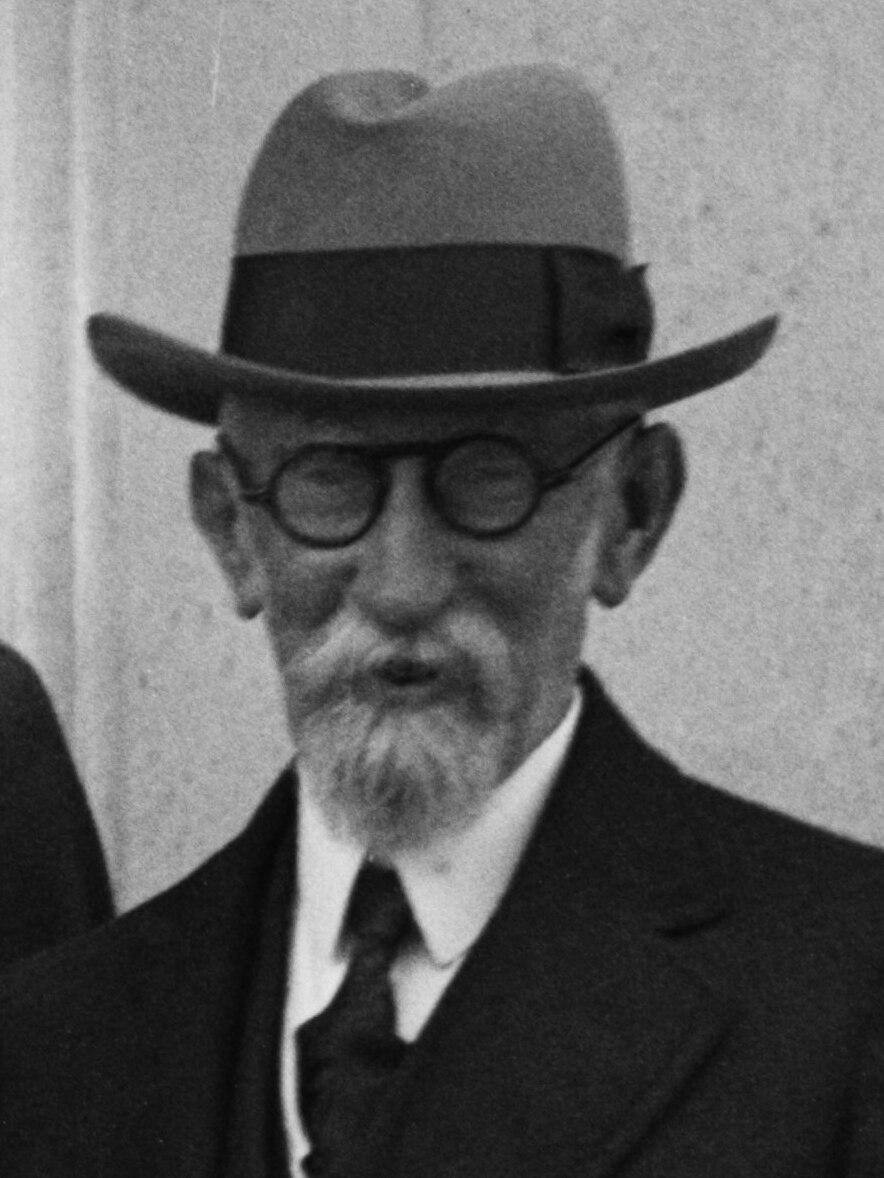

Judge of the United States Court of Appeals for the Fourth Circuit
- In office June 2, 1921 – April 9, 1931
- Appointed by: Warren G. Harding
- Preceded by: Jeter Connelly Pritchard
- Succeeded by: Morris Ames Soper

Judge of the United States District Court for the Eastern District of Virginia
- In office March 22, 1898 – June 9, 1921
- Appointed by: William McKinley
- Preceded by: Robert William Hughes
- Succeeded by: Duncan Lawrence Groner

Member of the U.S. House of Representatives from Virginia's 3rd district
- In office April 12, 1890 – March 3, 1891
- Preceded by: George D. Wise
- Succeeded by: George D. Wise

Member of the Virginia House of Delegates from Henrico County
- In office December 2, 1885 – December 4, 1889
- Preceded by: Martin W. Hazlewood
- Succeeded by: Joseph B. Davis

United States Attorney for the Eastern District of Virginia
- In office 1883–1885
- Appointed by: Chester A. Arthur
- Preceded by: John Sergeant Wise
- Succeeded by: John C. Gibson

Personal details
- Born: Edmund Waddill Jr. May 22, 1855 Charles City County, Virginia
- Died: April 9, 1931 (aged 75) Richmond, Virginia
- Resting place: Hollywood Cemetery; Richmond, Virginia
- Party: Republican
- Education: University of Virginia read law

Edmund Waddill Jr. (May 22, 1855 – April 9, 1931) was Virginia lawyer and Republican politician who became a United States representative from Virginia's 3rd congressional district, as well as served as both a trial and appellate judge. Before his legislative service, he was a Virginia trial judge, and afterward became a United States district judge of the United States District Court for the Eastern District of Virginia and still later served on the United States Court of Appeals for the Fourth Circuit.

== Early life and education ==
Born in Charles City County, Virginia, Waddill was educated by private tutors and attended Norwood Academy. He was a deputy clerk of the courts of Charles City, New Kent, Hanover, and Henrico counties and of the circuit court of Richmond, Virginia. He studied law at the University of Virginia and read law in 1877

== Early career ==
Admitted to the Virginia bar, Wadill began a private legal practice in Hanover County from 1877 to 1878, then moved to Richmond, where he practiced in the city and surrounding Henrico County from 1878 to 1880. In 1880, the Virginia General Assembly named him a Judge of the County Court of Henrico County. He served for three years (to 1883) before resigning to take the position of United States Attorney for the Eastern District of Virginia (from 1883 to 1885). Waddill then resumed his private legal practice as well as successfully ran for the Virginia House of Delegates (a part time position) and was re-elected, serving from 1885 until 1889.

== Congressional service ==
As a Republican candidate, Waddill unsuccessfully ran for election in 1886 to the 50th United States Congress, but he successfully contested the election of United States Representative George D. Wise to the United States House of Representatives of the 51st United States Congress, then served from April 12, 1890, to March 3, 1891. He was not a candidate for renomination in 1890, but instead resumed his legal practice in Richmond from 1891 to 1898. He was a delegate to the Republican National Conventions in 1892 and 1896.

== Judicial service ==
President William McKinley nominated Waddill on March 10, 1898, to a seat on the United States District Court for the Eastern District of Virginia vacated by Judge Robert William Hughes. The United States Senate confirmed the nomination on March 22, 1898, and Judge Waddill received his commission the same day. One of his famous cases involved suffragettes sentenced to jail for protesting as "the Silent Sentinels" outside the White House. On November 14, 1917, the women sentenced to the Occoquon Workhouse in Lorton, Virginia endured a "Night of Terror" which included beatings by prison guards, and suffragette Lucy Burns was forced to stand all night with the arms shackled to her cell's ceiling. Three days later, Judge Waddill issued a Writ of Habeas Corprus seeking to free the women jailed near Alexandria, Virginia, and ten days later ordered them released. Judge Waddill's district court service terminated on June 9, 1921, upon his elevation to the Fourth Circuit.

Waddill was nominated by President Warren G. Harding on May 26, 1921, to a seat on the United States Court of Appeals for the Fourth Circuit vacated by Judge Jeter Connelly Pritchard. He was confirmed by the Senate on June 2, 1921, and received his commission the same day. He was a member of the Conference of Senior Circuit Judges (now the Judicial Conference of the United States) from 1925 to 1930. His service terminated on April 9, 1931, due to his death in Richmond.

== Death and legacy ==
Judge Waddill was interred in Hollywood Cemetery in Richmond. His son-in-law Menalcus Lankford helped revitalize the Republican party in Virginia's Tidewater region and also served 2 terms in congress, representing Virginia's 2nd Congressional district.

== Sources ==
- "Edmund Waddill Jr". Biographical Directory of the United States Congress.

U.S. House of Representatives
Preceded by George D. Wise	Member of the U.S. House of Representatives from Virginia's 3rd congressional district 1890–1891	Succeeded by George D. Wise
Legal offices
Preceded by Robert William Hughes	Judge of the United States District Court for the Eastern District of Virginia; 1898–1921	Succeeded by Duncan Lawrence Groner
Preceded by Jeter Connelly Pritchard	Judge of the United States Court of Appeals for the Fourth Circuit; 1921–1931	Succeeded by Morris Ames Soper
