= John Lamb (Virginia politician) =

American politician (1840–1924)

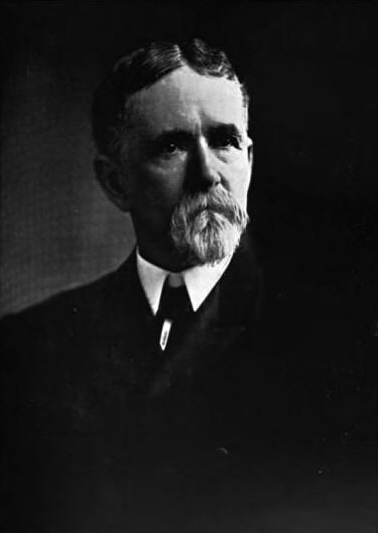

Member of the U.S. House of Representatives from Virginia's 3rd district
- In office March 4, 1897 – March 3, 1913
- Preceded by: Tazewell Ellett
- Succeeded by: Andrew J. Montague

Chairman of the Committee on Agriculture
- In office March 4, 1911 – March 3, 1913
- Preceded by: Charles F. Scott
- Succeeded by: Asbury F. Lever

Personal details
- Born: June 12, 1840 Sussex County, Virginia, U.S.
- Died: November 21, 1924 (aged 84) Richmond, Virginia, U.S.
- Resting place: Hollywood Cemetery, Richmond, Virginia
- Party: Democratic
- Profession: farmer, businessman, politician

Military service
- Allegiance: Confederate States of America
- Branch/service: Confederate Army
- Unit: Company D, 3rd Virginia Cavalry
- Battles/wars: American Civil War

John Lamb (June 12, 1840 – November 21, 1924) was a Virginia farmer, Confederate officer, businessman and politician who served 16 years in the United States House of Representatives.

== Early and family life ==
Born in Sussex County, Virginia, to the former Ann Christian (1820–1876), and her Whig farmer, schoolteacher and surveyor husband, Lycurgus Lamb (1814–1855), John Lamb would have several sisters (three who married after the conflict), as well as a younger brother, James Christian Lamb (1853–1903; who became a lawyer and chancery judge in Richmond). He was descended from the bishop Robert Lamb. His father was a firstborn son and named this boy, his firstborn son, for his own father, but died before any of his children reached adulthood. The Lamb family had owned the "Rural Shades" plantation in Charles City County for 200 years, and by this boy's lifetime, had long used enslaved labor there. In the 1850 census, Lycurgus Lamb owned 15 enslaved people in Charles City County (ten taxable as more than 10 years old). A decade later, when John was still under legal age, his mother Anne E. Lamb owned 14 enslaved people in Charles City County.

His mother's family could also trace their descent from colonial-era immigrants, and his maternal great grandfather, Lt. Joseph Christian has served in the American Revolutionary War. His maternal grandfather James Hendricks Christian (1794–1873) owned 26 slaves in Charles City County in 1850. Because his father was his initial teacher before establishment of public schools in Virginia, John Lamb's formal education paused after his father's death, though he studied civil engineering in his spare time, particularly after the American Civil War described below.

== Confederate States Army officer ==
As the Civil War began and Virginia seceded from the Union, John Lamb on May 18, 1861 enlisted as a private in Company D, Third Virginia Cavalry, probably alongside his cousin Edmund Turner Christian (1839–1909). His cousin James A. Lamb had joined that company on May 9, 1861. Their unit joined the Confederate States Army and was assigned duty in western Virginia (some of whose counties had voted to secede from Virginia's secession and remain in the Union). John Lamb was captured on September 29, 1861 near Charleston (in what would become the state of West Virginia) and exchanged for a Union soldier prisoner on October 8, 1862.

Following the 3rd Virginia's participation in the Gettysburg campaign, Lamb received his first officer commission, as lieutenant on September 21, 1863. Wounded on April 18, 1864, he was promoted to Captain on April 30, 1864, then wounded again on May 28, 1864, Capt. Lamb commanded his company for the rest of the war. He promoted E.T. Christian to sergeant in 1864, but later demoted him to private. His lawyer cousin Isaac Hill Christian (1831–1904) joined the unit in October 1863 and survived his wound, although his other cousin James would retire from Company D on July 18, 1864 as a result of a disabling arm wound.

== Marriage and family ==
On November 10, 1869, in Richmond, Lamb married Martha Redd Wade (1849-1915), one of three daughters of Rev. Anderson Wade (1809-1880; originally of Prince Edward County, Virginia) and his wife. "Mattie" Wade Lamb had been in Martinsville. Their family included a daughter Bessie Lamb Woolfolk (b.1885) and four sons: Anderson Wade Lamb (1873–1935), lawyer John A. Lamb (1875–), William Clark Lamb (1881–1947) and mining engineer Frederick Beverley Lamb (1888–1932). All but the last were born at "Green Yard" in Charles City County before Lamb moved his family to Richmond in 1888.

== Career ==
After the war, Lamb continued the family farm in Charles City County for about a decade after his mother's death. About 1888, he moved with his family to the state capitol, Richmond. Meanwhile, in 1869, Lamb lost his first campaign for elective office, to the new seat in the Virginia House of Delegates. A freeborn mulatto farmer, Robert G.W. Jones won the seat, but two years later the district was combined with neighboring New Kent County, and neither man stood for election to the combined district. After an interim election won by a white Republican, that seat would be held by Lamb's fellow 3rd Virginia Cavalry officer, Benjamin W. Lacy for years. Lacy aligned with the Readjuster Party and when they took control of the legislature, they elected Lacy their Speaker and later to the Virginia Supreme Court. Lamb, meanwhile, won local elections within Charles City County at various times and served as sheriff, treasurer, and surveyor.

In 1896, Lamb defeated Tazewell Ellett and won election as a Democrat to the Fifty-fifth Congress. He won-re-election to seven succeeding Congresses, although the counties within the district changed as a result of federal censuses (in particular, Charles City County was not originally in the Richmond-centered district, but later was included). Thus Lamb served sixteen years: from March 4, 1897 – March 3, 1913, including as chairman of the Committee on Agriculture during the Sixty-second Congress. In 1912, Lamb lost his bid for re-election to former Virginia governor Andrew Jackson Montague.

After leaving Congress, Lamb remained in Richmond as the superintendent of the Virginia Historical Society, with its extensive Confederate memorial murals.

== Death and legacy ==
Lamb survived his wife and died in Richmond on November 21, 1924. He was interred in historic Hollywood Cemetery, as would be several family members, although his parents had been interred at the Lamb family cemetery in Charles City County.

== Electoral history ==
- 1896; Lamb was elected to the U.S. House of Representatives with 55.54% of the vote, defeating Republican L.L. Lewis, Independent Republicans Elisha L. Lewis, William H. Lewis, and John Mitchell, and Progressive James O. Atwood.
- 1898; Lamb was re-elected with 69.14% of the vote, defeating Republicans Otis H. Russell and Benjamin B. Wiesiger and Independents John J. Quantz and Allie Dillard.
- 1900; Lamb was re-elected with 65.63% of the vote, defeating Republican Edgar Allen and Independent John Laub.
- 1902; Lamb was re-elected with 81.08% of the vote, defeating Republicans B.W. Edwards and William E. Talley, Socialist Labor Quantz, Socialist T.A. Hollins, and Independent Republican Phillip Harris.
- 1904; Lamb was re-elected with 78.01% of the vote, defeating Republican Allen, Independent Republican George A. Harrison, Independent J.B. Johnson, Socialist Labor H. Adolph Muller, and Socialist John Catrell.
- 1906; Lamb was re-elected with 82.17% of the vote, defeating Republican G.H. Hanson, Independent Johnson, and Socialist Hollins.
- 1908; Lamb was re-elected with 77.24% of the vote, defeating Republican J.G. Luce and Socialist Hollins.
- 1910; Lamb was re-elected with 84.84% of the vote, defeating Republican W.R. Vawter, Socialist D.D. Harrison, and Socialist Labor Hollins.

Political offices
Preceded by Charles F. Scott	Chairman of the House Agriculture Committee; 1911–1913	Succeeded by Andrew J. Montague
U.S. House of Representatives
Preceded by Tazewell Ellett	Member of the U.S. House of Representatives from Virginia's 3rd congressional district 1897–1913	Succeeded by Andrew J. Montague
