= James E. Stowers =

American Businessman

James E. Stowers Jr. (January 10, 1924 – March 17, 2014) was an American businessman who was the founder of American Century Investments and the Stowers Institute for Medical Research.

== Biography ==
Born and raised in Kansas City, Missouri, the son and grandson of medical doctors, Stowers graduated from Kemper Military School in Boonville, Missouri. He earned a bachelor's degree from the University of Missouri, where he also completed a two-year degree in medicine. He joined the Army Air Corps where he became a fighter pilot and gunnery instructor. Upon his return to civilian life in 1945, he enlisted in the Air Force Reserves and served as a captain until resigning his commission in 1957. Stowers entered the business world, after deciding not to become a doctor like his father and grandfather. After a stint selling mutual funds for Kansas-based Waddell & Reed, he founded a term life insurance firm – J.E. Stowers and Company.

He had four children and a brother.

== American Century Investments ==
In 1958, Stowers started Twentieth Century Mutual Funds, a family of no-load funds, in Kansas City, Missouri. Stowers started the funds in 1958 with just $100,000 in assets from 24 shareholders. He built his business concentrating on small investors. The company changed its name to American Century Investments in 1997. American Century's headquarters are located at 4500 Main in Kansas City, Missouri, near the Country Club Plaza, and employs around 1,300 people.

== Stowers Institute for Medical Research ==
In 1994, Stowers and his wife Virginia Stowers, both cancer survivors, founded the Stowers Institute for Medical Research, a $2 billion biomedical research facility also located in Kansas City. The institute's mission is to make a significant contribution to humanity through medical research by expanding our understanding of the secrets of life and by improving life's quality through innovative approaches to the causes, treatment and prevention of diseases.

Stowers investigators conduct basic research on the genes and proteins that guide the function and behavior of living organisms and the individual cells within. The Institute opened its doors in November 2000. By 2012, there were 22 independent research programs plus core facilities in computational biology, cytometry, electron microscopy, histology, imaging, microscopy, molecular biology, proteomics and screening. Currently, the institute is home to over 550 members, including around 350 scientists, research associates, technicians and scientific support staff.

Research at the Stowers Institute is primarily funded through the Hope Shares Endowment, most of which is the product of the Stowers’ generosity. The Institute receives additional competitive grant funding from the National Institutes of Health, the Howard Hughes Medical Institute, the American Cancer Society, the March of Dimes and other entities.

== Awards and honors ==
- 2001, Golden Plate Award of the American Academy of Achievement, presented by Awards Council member Dr. Francis Collins
- 2002, Chosen to be a torch bearer for the 2002 Winter Olympic Games in Salt Lake City
- 2005, Ernst & Young’s Entrepreneur of the Year in the Financial Services Category
- 2009, Research!America's Gordon and Llura Gund Leadership Award
- 2010, Expect Miracles Foundation’s Lifetime Achievement Award
- 2011, Forbes Magazine names Jim and Virginia Stowers to its list of the “Biggest Givers” – those who have donated at least $1 billion to charities or foundations

== Death ==
Stowers died aged 90 at his home in Kansas City, Missouri in March 2014.
