= George D. Wise (politician) =

American politician

George Douglas Wise
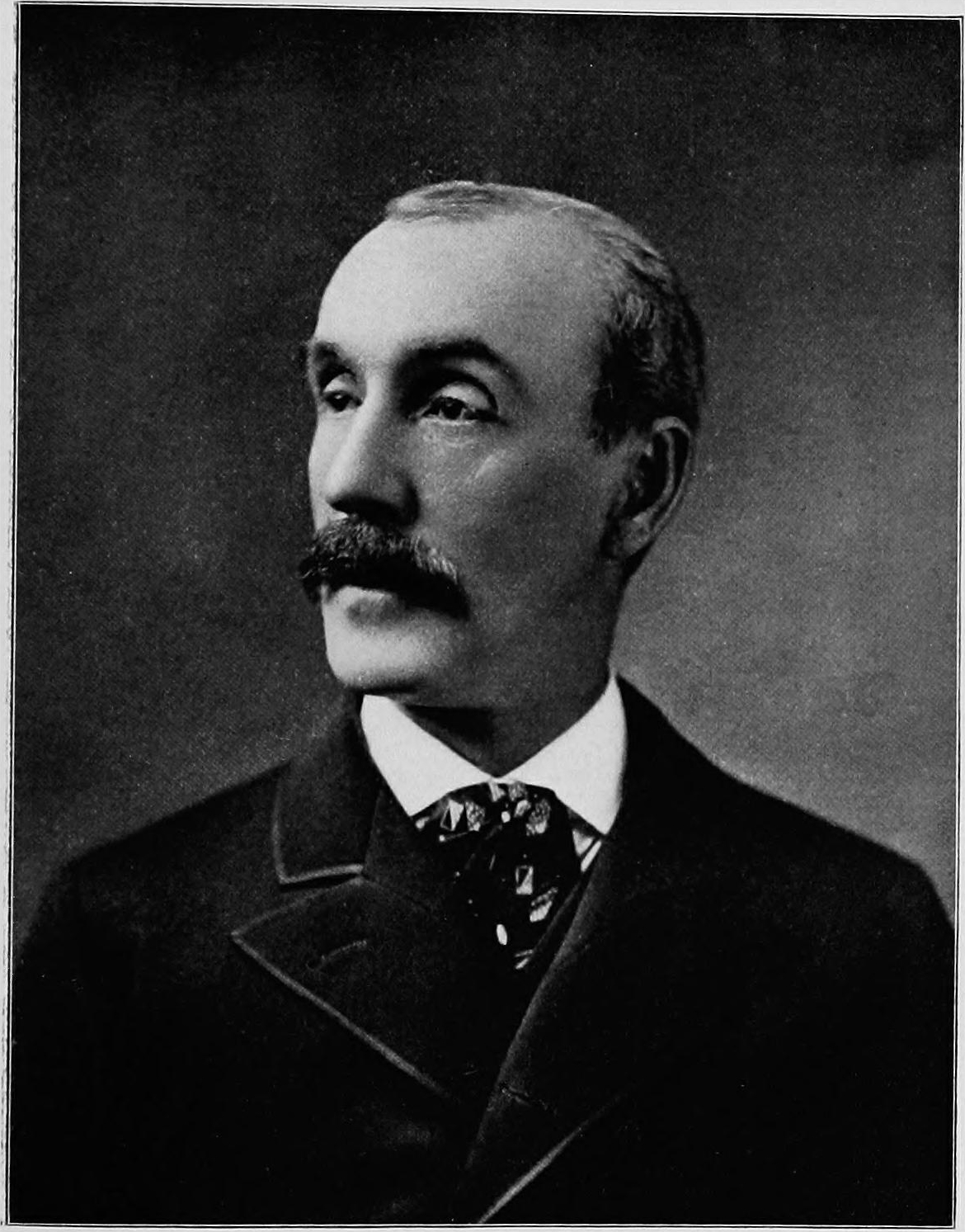

Member of the U.S. House of Representatives from Virginia's 3rd district
- In office March 4, 1891 – March 3, 1895
- Preceded by: Edmund Waddill, Jr.
- Succeeded by: Tazewell Ellett
- In office March 4, 1881 – April 10, 1890
- Preceded by: Joseph E. Johnston
- Succeeded by: Edmund Waddill, Jr.

Chairman of the House Committee on Interstate and Foreign Commerce
- In office March 28, 1892 – March 3, 1895
- Preceded by: Roger Quarles Mills
- Succeeded by: William Peters Hepburn

Chairman of the House Committee on Manufactures
- In office March 4, 1887 – March 3, 1889
- Preceded by: John Holroyd Bagley, Jr.
- Succeeded by: Henry Bacon

Personal details
- Born: June 4, 1831 Deep Creek, Accomack County, Virginia, U.S.
- Died: February 4, 1908 (aged 76) Richmond, Virginia, U.S.
- Resting place: Hollywood Cemetery, Richmond, Virginia, U.S.
- Party: Democratic
- Education: Indiana University; College of William and Mary
- Profession: Lawyer

Military service
- Allegiance: Confederate States of America
- Branch/service: Confederate States Army
- Rank: Captain
- Battles/wars: American Civil War

George Douglas Wise (June 4, 1831 – February 4, 1908) was a U.S. representative from Virginia. He was nephew of Henry Alexander Wise, and cousin of John Sergeant Wise and Richard Alsop Wise.

== Biography ==
Wise was the son of Tully Robinson and Margaret Douglas Pettitt (Wise) Wise, who were double second cousins. He was born at "Deep Creek," the Wise estate in Accomack County, near Onancock, Virginia, Wise was graduated from Indiana University at Bloomington. He studied law in the College of William and Mary, Williamsburg, Virginia. He was admitted to the bar and commenced practice in Richmond, Virginia. He served as captain in the Confederate States Army during the Civil War. He was Commonwealth's attorney of the city of Richmond from 1870 to 1889, when he resigned.

Wise was elected as a Democrat to the Forty-seventh and to the three succeeding Congresses (March 4, 1881 – March 3, 1889). He served as chairman of the Committee on Manufactures (Forty-ninth Congress). Presented credentials as a Member-elect to the Fifty-first Congress and served from March 4, 1889, to April 10, 1890, when he was succeeded by Edmund Waddill, Jr., who contested his election.

Wise embraced ideas of a master race, once telling the House of Representatives that "if I could I would not have the mingling of Caucasian blood with that of any inferior race." He referred to Chinese immigrants as "this indigestible mass . . . inferior in mental and moral qualities . . . a continual menace to the existence of republican institutions.”

Wise was elected to the Fifty-second and Fifty-third Congresses (March 4, 1891 – March 3, 1895). He served as chairman of the committee on Interstate and Foreign Commerce (Fifty-second and Fifty-third Congresses). Wise was a delegate to the Virginia Constitutional Convention of 1901-1902. He died in Richmond, Virginia, February 4, 1908. He was interred in Hollywood Cemetery.

== Electoral history ==
- 1880; Wise was elected to the U.S. House of Representatives with 55.94% of the vote, defeating Readjuster John Sergeant Wise and Republican H.L. Pelonze.
- 1882; Wise was re-elected with 57.12% of the vote, defeating Readjuster John Ambler Smith.
- 1884; Wise was re-elected with 52.4% of the vote, defeating Republican Robert T. Hubbard.
- 1886; Wise was re-elected with 52.73% of the vote, defeating Republican Edmund Waddill, Jr.
- 1888; Wise was re-elected with 50.42% of the vote, however the results were contested and Republican Waddill, Jr. was seated.
- 1890; Wise was re-elected unopposed.
- 1892; Wise was re-elected with 63.94% of the vote, defeating Republican Walter E. Grant.

== Sources ==
- United States Congress. "George D. Wise (id: W000648)". Biographical Directory of the United States Congress.

U.S. House of Representatives
Preceded by Joseph E. Johnston	Member of the U.S. House of Representatives from Virginia's 3rd congressional district 1881–1890	Succeeded by Edmund Waddill, Jr.
Preceded by Edmund Waddill, Jr.	Member of the U.S. House of Representatives from Virginia's 3rd congressional district 1891–1895	Succeeded by Tazewell Ellett
Political offices
Preceded by Roger Quarles Mills; Texas	Chairman of the House Interstate and Foreign Commerce Committee; 1892–1895	Succeeded by William Peters Hepburn; Iowa
Preceded by John Holroyd Bagley, Jr. New York	Chairman of the House Manufactures Committee; 1887–1889	Succeeded by Henry Bacon; New York
