= Joseph P. Cleland =

U.S. Army major general

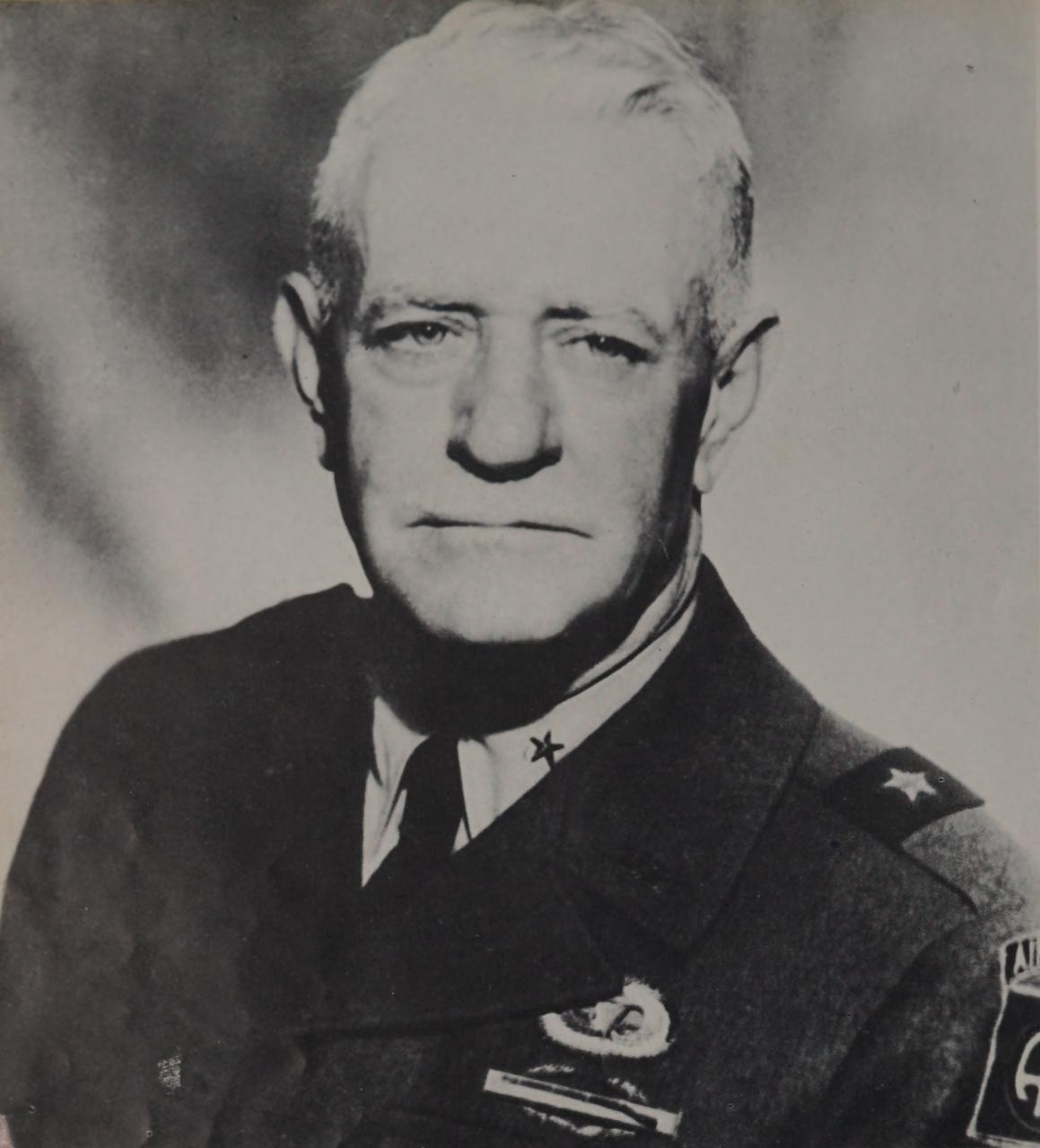
- Cleland as brigadier general and assistant division commander, 82nd Airborne Division, 1952
- Born: March 2, 1901; Holdrege, Nebraska, U.S.
- Died: March 28, 1975 (aged 74); Belleair, Florida, U.S.
- Burial place: West Point Cemetery, West Point, New York, U.S.
- Education: Kemper Military School; United States Military Academy; United States Army Command and General Staff College
- Spouse: Florence Emily Cadotte (m. 1931–1975)
- Military career
- Service: United States Army
- Service years: 1925–1955
- Rank: Major General
- Nicknames: "Great White Father" "Jumping Joe"
- Service number: O-16239
- Unit: U.S. Army Infantry Branch
- Commands: Headquarters and Headquarters Company, 33rd Infantry Regiment; Provisional Service Command, Guadalcanal; 103rd Infantry Regiment; U.S. Military Attaché, Santiago, Chile; 504th Airborne Infantry Regiment; 508th Infantry Regiment; 40th Infantry Division; IX Corps; 1st Cavalry Division; XVIII Airborne Corps
- Wars: World War II; Korean War
- Awards: Army Distinguished Service Medal; Silver Star; Legion of Merit; Soldier's Medal; Bronze Star Medal; Complete list
- Other work: President, Kemper Military School

Joseph P. Cleland (March 2, 1901 – March 28, 1975) (Note: Some army records give Cleland's birth year as 1902.) was a career officer in the United States Army. A 1925 graduate of the United States Military Academy (West Point), he served until 1955 and was a veteran of World War II and the Korean War. Cleland attained the rank of major general, and his commands included the 103rd Infantry Regiment, 40th Infantry Division, IX Corps, 1st Cavalry Division, and XVIII Airborne Corps. His awards and decorations included the Army Distinguished Service Medal, Silver Star, Legion of Merit, Soldier's Medal, and Bronze Star Medal.

A native of Holdrege, Nebraska, Cleland was raised and educated in Omaha and attended Kemper Military School, from which he graduated in 1921. He then attended the United States Military Academy, from which he graduated in 1925 as a second lieutenant of Infantry. Initially assigned to the 17th Infantry, Cleland served at several posts in the western United States. During the 1930s, he served in the Philippines and Panama, and attended the United States Army Command and General Staff College.

During World War II, Cleland served as chief of staff for the 43rd Infantry Division, then commanded the division's 103rd Infantry Regiment during combat in the Philippines. He ended the war as a temporary brigadier general and deputy commander of the 43rd Division, and he subsequently served in Japan during the post-war occupation.

After the war, Cleland volunteered for parachutist training, after which he commanded the 504th Airborne Infantry Regiment and 508th Airborne Regimental Combat Team. During the Korean War, he commanded the 40th Infantry Division, 1st Cavalry Division and IX Corps. After the war he commanded the XVIII Airborne Corps.

Cleland retired in 1955 and was the owner and operator of a farm in Bedford, Virginia. In addition, he served as president of Kemper Military School from 1957 to 1959. After a period of declining health, in the early 1970s Cleland sold the farm and retired to Belleair, Florida. He died in Belleair on March 28, 1975, and was buried at West Point Cemetery.

== Early life ==
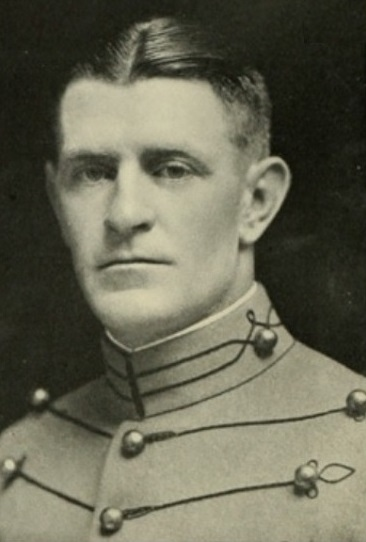
Cleland as a West Point senior, 1925

Joseph Pringle Cleland was born in Holdrege, Nebraska on March 2, 1901, the son of Joseph Pringle Cleland (1863–1946) and Effie (Geddes) Cleland. The senior Joseph Cleland was a career employee of the United States Post Office Department, and served at the U.S. post office in Vladivostok during the post-World War I Siberian intervention. The junior Cleland's older sister Effie was a teacher and social worker who joined the American Red Cross for World War I and helped operate Morale, Welfare, and Recreation facilities in Belgium, France, and post-war Germany.

Cleland was raised and educated in Omaha, Nebraska, and in 1919 began attendance at Boonville, Missouri's Kemper Military School. He graduated in 1921 and attained the rank of cadet senior captain, the highest student rank. In addition, he received athletic letters for football and basketball, as well as prizes for debate and scholarship.

Cleland's status as the honor graduate of a military institute enabled him to obtain an at-large appointment to the United States Military Academy, and he began attendance in the autumn of 1921. During his college career, Cleland continued his involvement in sports and played soccer and football, took part in indoor track and field, and served as captain of the wrestling team. Cleland graduated from West Point in 1925 ranked 207 of 244, and received his commission as a second lieutenant of Infantry.

== Start of career ==
Initially assigned to the 17th Infantry Regiment, Cleland served at Fort Omaha, (1925–1926), Fort Leavenworth (1926), and Fort Crook (1926–1928). From September 1928 to June 1929 he was a Tank School student at Fort Meade. After graduation, Cleland was assigned to the 45th Infantry Regiment (Philippine Scouts) at Fort William McKinley. In November 1930, he was promoted to first lieutenant and assigned to the 31st Infantry Regiment at the Post of Manila and Camp John Hay. In June 1931, Cleland married Florence Emily Cadotte in Manila; her father was from Michigan, and her mother was from Spain. They remained married until his death, and had no children.

From August 1932 to May 1933, Cleland was a student at the Infantry Officers Course. From May 1933 to May 1936, he was assigned to the 29th Infantry Regiment, the unit that supported the Infantry School by training infantry soldiers and leaders, demonstrating tactics, and testing innovations in military vehicles and equipment. He was promoted to captain in August 1935, and performed temporary duty at the headquarters of the Philippine Department from August to November 1935.

From May 1936 to September 1938, Cleland was assistant professor of military science at Kemper Military School. He attended the United States Army Command and General Staff College from September 1938 to June 1939. After graduating, he was assigned to command Headquarters and Headquarters Company, 33rd Infantry Regiment and posted to Fort Clayton, Panama Canal Zone. As the army expanded in anticipation of U.S. entry into World War II, in January 1941, Cleland was promoted to temporary major and assigned as operations officer of the Panama Mobile Force. From November 1941 to July 1942, he was assigned as assistant military attaché in Bogotá, Colombia. Cleland was promoted to temporary lieutenant colonel in December 1941 and permanent major in June 1942.

== Continued career ==
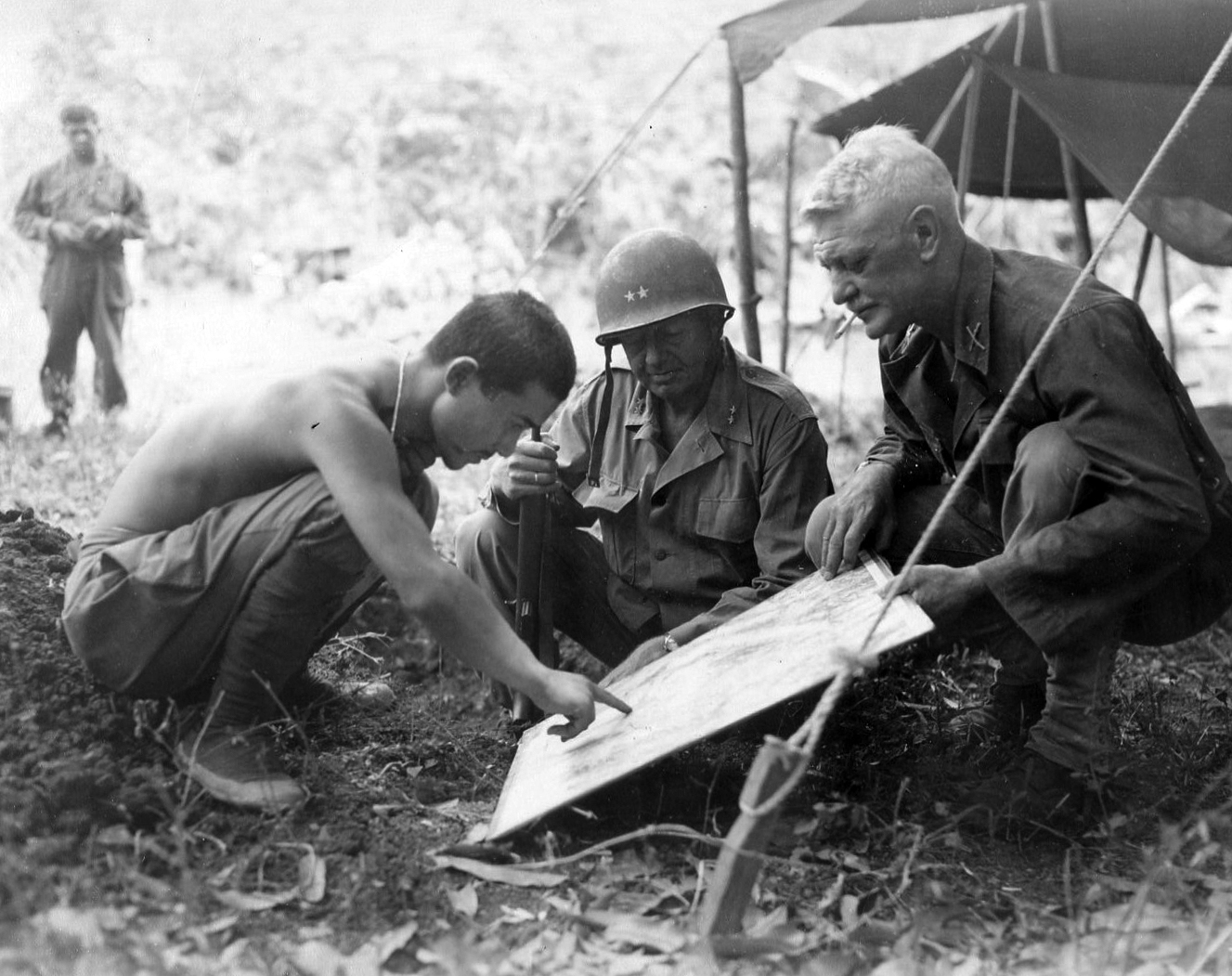
Captured mortarman points out Japanese positions in the Philippines to Major General Leonard F. Wing (center) and Cleland, March 1945

In July 1942, Cleland was assigned to Headquarters, South West Pacific Area as a staff officer in the office of the assistant chief of staff for logistics (G4).ref After a staff visit to Guadalcanal, he recommended establishment of a Provisional Service Command (PSC), and when it was approved he was designated its commanding officer. He was promoted to temporary colonel in November 1942. While in charge of the PSC, Cleland was near Bougainville Island when he observed a downed U.S. aviator in the sea. Cleland risked his life by swimming a half mile in rough seas while towing a life raft to rescue the pilot, who was having difficulty swimming because he could not free himself from his parachute, which resulted in Cleland being awarded the Soldier's Medal.

In November 1943, Cleland was assigned as chief of staff of the 43rd Infantry Division, then located on the island of Munda. He took part in the division's combat during the New Georgia campaign, New Guinea campaign, and Battle of Luzon, and remained in this position until April 1944, when he was assigned to command the division's 103rd Infantry Regiment. Cleland led the regiment during combat on Luzon, including the attack against Japanese forces in San Fabian, Pangasinan and capture of the Ipo Dam, the site of Manila's main water supply. In July 1945, he was promoted to temporary brigadier general and assigned as the 43rd Division's assistant division commander. Cleland remained in this position until the end of the war in August 1945, as well as the initial period of the U.S. Occupation of Japan in late 1945.

== Later career ==
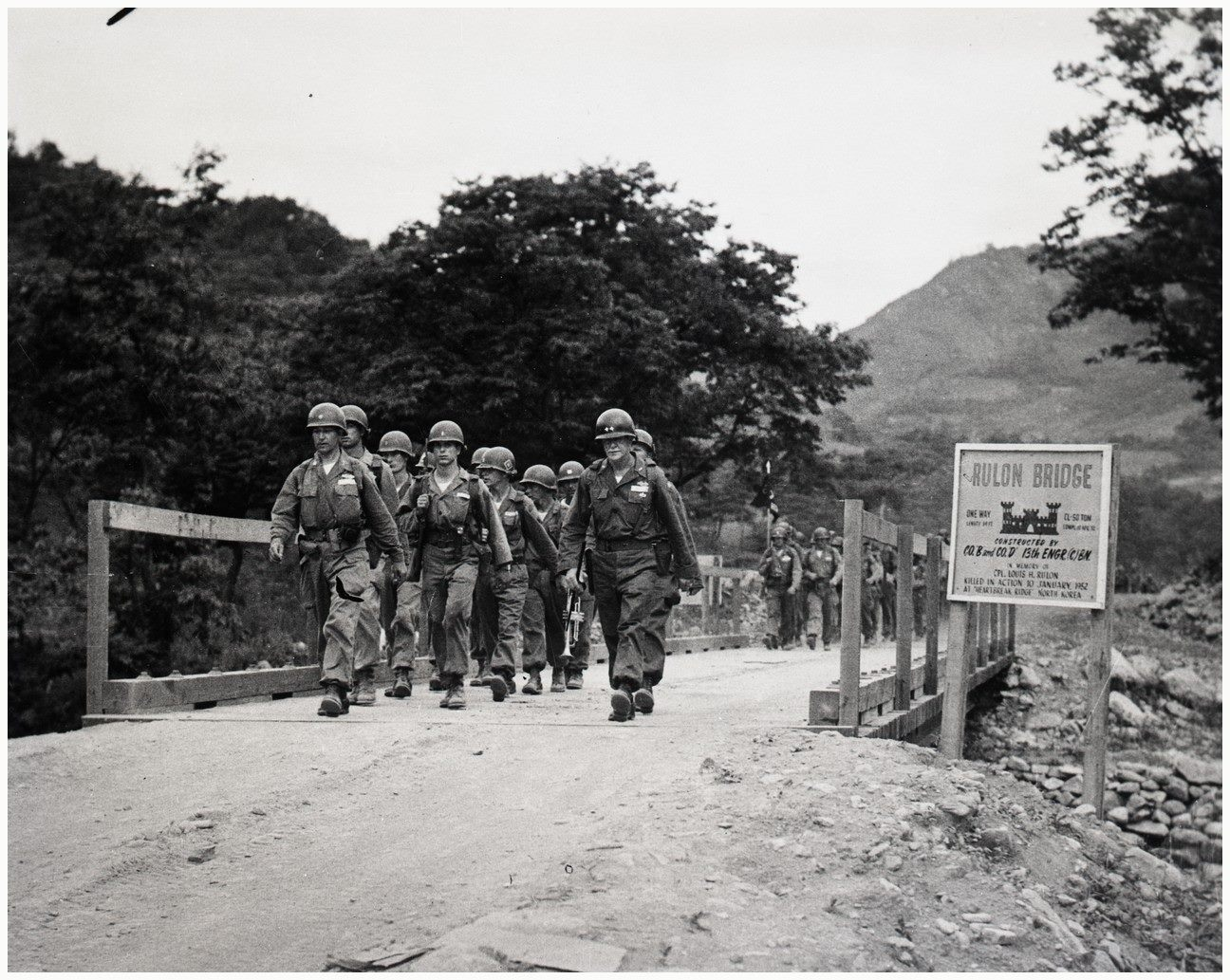
Cleland leads 40th Infantry Division staff on road march in Korea, 1952

In January 1946, Cleland was assigned as U.S. military attaché in Santiago, Chile. In March 1946, his temporary brigadier general's rank was terminated, and in July 1947 he was assigned to the faculty of the Command and General Staff College. He was promoted to permanent lieutenant colonel in July 1948 and permanent colonel in October 1949. In April 1950, Cleland volunteered for the United States Army Airborne School; because his hair was prematurely white and he completed the course at the advanced age of 50, he earned the nicknames "Great White Father" and "Jumping Joe". After receiving his jump wings, Cleland was assigned to command the 504th Airborne Infantry Regiment. He was subsequently assigned to command the 508th Airborne Regimental Combat Team during its activation and initial organization. In September 1951, Cleland was promoted to brigadier general and assigned as assistant division commander of the 82nd Airborne Division.

Cleland was assigned to Korean War duty as commander of the 40th Infantry Division in June 1952, and was subsequently promoted to major general. He led his division in several battles throughout 1952 and 1953, and briefly commanded IX Corps. In April 1953 was assigned to command of the 1st Cavalry Division in Japan. In June 1953, Cleland returned to the United States, where he was assigned to command the XVIII Airborne Corps. He remained in this position until retiring in June 1955.

== Retirement and death ==
After retiring, Cleland and his wife purchased Lone Pine Farm, a 500-acre cattle enterprise in Bedford, Virginia. Over time, the Clelands renovated the main house, constructed new outbuildings, and developed the farm into a successful venture, which they operated until they sold it in 1972. From 1957 to 1959, Cleland served as president of Kemper Military School, during which he oversaw the conversion of the institute from a private for-profit enterprise into a non-profit.

The Clelands also traveled extensively, including a six-month trip around the perimeter of South America in 1956. After a 1964 visit to South Korea for the rededication of a school Cleland's division had constructed during the Korean War, they returned by way of the Philippines so Cleland could revisit the sites of some of his World War II battles, then spent several weeks in Hong Kong and Japan. In 1965, they toured northern Europe by car, including England, Scotland, Ireland, France, Spain, and Mallorca. In 1966, they toured most of the Mediterranean Sea perimeter by car. In early 1968, they visited the Scandinavian countries by car, then spent two months in Rome.

In 1969, Cleland and his wife were visiting Spain when he had to be hospitalized for glaucoma, which resulted in removal of his left eye. After selling their farm in 1972, they again visited Spain, where Cleland had to be hospitalized after a heart attack. The Clelands then moved to Belleair, Florida, where they resided near Mrs. Cleland's sister. They planned to travel to Greece and Iran in 1974, but had to end their trip in Spain after Cleland suffered a stroke. His health continued to decline after returning to Florida, and he died in Belleair on March 28, 1975. Cleland was buried at West Point Cemetery.

== Awards ==
Cleland's U.S. awards and decorations included:

- Army Distinguished Service Medal
- Silver Star
- Legion of Merit with oak leaf cluster
- Soldier's Medal
- Bronze Star Medal with oak leaf cluster
- Asiatic–Pacific Campaign Medal
- American Campaign Medal
- World War II Victory Medal
- American Defense Service Medal
- Army of Occupation Medal (Japan)
- Combat Infantryman Badge
- Parachutist Badge

His foreign awards included:

- Philippine Liberation Medal
- Order of Merit (Commander) (Chile)
- Estrella de Oro (Chile)
- Order of the British Empire (Honorary Knight Commander) (Great Britain)

In 1959, Norwich University awarded Cleland the honorary degree of LL.D. In 1964, Francis Cardinal Spellman awarded Cleland the Sovereign Military Order of Malta in recognition of his work on behalf of orphans in South Korea. The United States Military Academy presents the annual Joseph P. Cleland Memorial Leadership Award as part of the recognition ceremonies for graduating seniors.
