= Stowers Institute for Medical Research =

American medical-research institute

Coordinates: 39°2′11.67″N 94°34′27.08″W

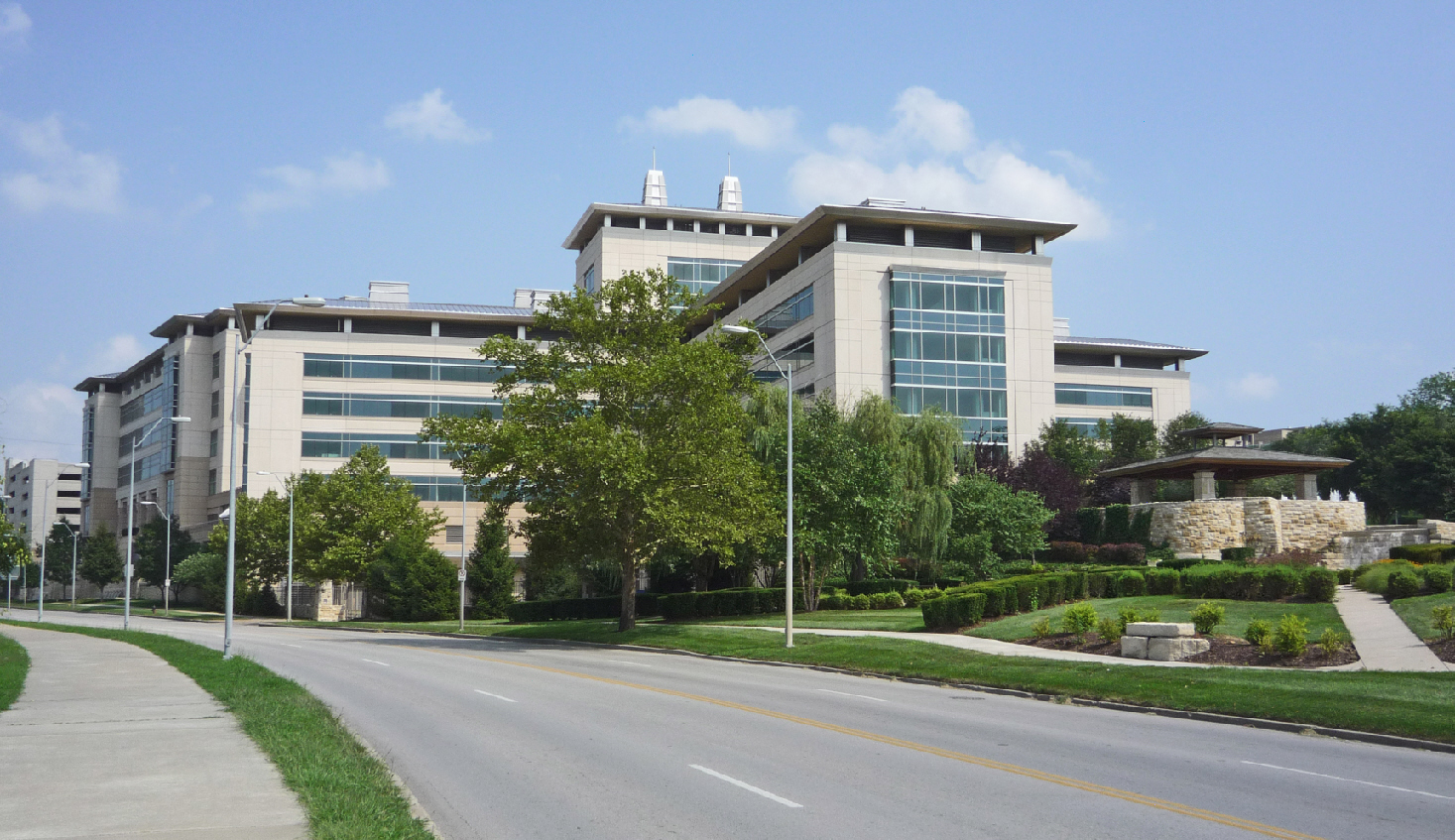
Stowers Institute for Medical Research.

The Stowers Institute for Medical Research is an independently operated, non-profit organization focused on foundational biological research, based in Kansas City, Missouri.

The institute is home to Principal Investigator labs and core Technology Centers actively investigating biology in research areas such as development and regeneration, evolutionary biology, genetics and genomics, molecular and cellular biology, neuroscience, and systems biology.

James E. Stowers Jr. and Virginia Stowers established the Stowers Institute in 1994 after both were diagnosed with and recovered from cancer. Their collective vision was to create a world class research institution, devoted to understanding biology at its most fundamental level. Jim and Virginia bestowed nearly $2 billion of their personal wealth to build the Institute’s 600,000-square-foot research facility, situated on the former campus of the Menorah Medical Center in Kansas City, Missouri. The Institute was designed to provide state-of-the-art laboratory space, equipment, and technical support, and to encourage collaboration between scientists. The Institute opened its doors in 2000 and operates with the following mission: To make a significant contribution to humanity through medical research by expanding our understanding the secrets of life and by improving life’s quality through innovative approaches to the causes, treatments, and prevention of diseases.

== Funding model and affiliated organizations ==
Jim and Virginia Stowers created the Institute by endowing their personal wealth, the by-product of the company Jim Stowers built in 1958, American Century Investments (ACI). In addition to the Stowers’ initial financial gift, they established a unique funding model to ensure continued support for research. The Institute is the majority stakeholder for ACI, where over 40% of yearly profits from the company are distributed to the Institute as dividends. Since 2000, over $1.8 billion in dividends have powered research and discovery, untethering scientists from procuring outside funding and allowing researchers to pursue bold research questions.

The Stowers’ additionally created a for-profit enterprise, BioMed Valley Discoveries, a clinical stage biotechnology company to facilitate foundational research discoveries toward developing therapeutic treatments.

In 2022, the Stowers Institute established a year-round satellite laboratory at the Marine Biological Laboratory, an affiliate of the University of Chicago, in Woods Hole, Massachusetts.

== Organizational structure ==
The labs and Technology Centers at the Stowers Institute cooperate to answer fundamental questions of biology. Research programs are led by individuals who are leaders in their fields, with support from Technology Center scientists. Of the approximately 500 members, over 370 are scientific staff that include Principal Investigators, Technology Center Directors, postdoctoral scientists, predoctoral researchers, and technical support staff.

Diverse research organisms are used such as planarian flatworms, killifish and zebrafish, cnidarians including sea anemones and coral, bacteria, and plants along with more traditional organisms like mice, yeast, and fruit flies. These research organisms allow Stowers scientists to answer fundamental biological questions like how specific genes and proteins are expressed and regulated in development and in mature organisms, mechanisms governing regeneration, the role of prions and amyloid formation in both memory loss and persistence.

== The Graduate School of the Stowers Institute for Medical Research ==
In 2012, the inaugural class of predoctoral candidates joined the newly founded Stowers Graduate School. The program is an immersive and intensive experience for predoctoral researchers to earn a Ph.D. where all course work is completed within the first semester, enabling predocs to quickly begin hands-on laboratory research. The program offers a PhD in Biology, and enrolls an average of eight predoctoral researchers each year. In 2021, the Graduate School received institutional accreditation from the Higher Learning Commission, an accrediting agency recognized by the U.S. Department of Education and the Council for Higher Education Accreditation.

In 2024, Stowers Investigator Matt Gibson, Ph.D., was named President of the Graduate School.

== Training programs ==
The Institute provides early career training and development for postdoctoral scientists. The program focuses on collaboration, mentorship, and access to advanced technologies, along with professional and personal development plans to ensure the success of transitioning to independent research opportunities.

Several training initiatives are available for undergraduates and recent graduates through The Graduate School. The Summer Scholars program, available for current undergraduate students and recent graduates, is an eight-week paid internship where participants conduct an independent research project under the mentorship of a Principal Investigator. The program accepts about 30 Scholars each year. In 2024, the Institute established the Computational Biology Scholars Program, a one-year fully funded training program geared toward early-career computational biologists and bioinformaticians.

== Leadership ==
The Institute is recognized by the IRS as a medical research organization. It is a Missouri not-for-profit corporation and is a 501(c)(3) charitable organization.

Its leadership consists of a Leadership Team, the Board of Directors composed of members of both Stowers and ACI, and the Stowers Resource Management Board. The Scientific Advisory Board, composed of members of the National Academy of Sciences, provides independent guidance on scientific affairs.
