= Committee of Nine =

The Committee of Nine was a group of conservative political leaders in Virginia, led by Alexander H. H. Stuart, following the American Civil War, when Virginia was required to adopt a new Constitution acknowledging the abolition of slavery before its readmission into the Union. They engineered the federal and state political machinery so that separate votes would be taken on the constitution (which was overwhelmingly ratified) and provisions restricting voting and office-holding rights of former Confederates (which was narrowly defeated).

== Background ==
Following the American Civil War and testimony before Congress that President Andrew Johnson's self-reconstruction was not allowing newly freed slaves many civil rights, Congress passed four Reconstruction Acts which set forth requirements for civilians to take control over the state governments in formerly Confederate states, instead of the military. Because Virginia's 1850 Constitution supported slavery and the delegates drafting the 1864 Constitution under provisional Governor Francis Harrison Pierpont did not represent the entire state, Virginia needed to draft and adopt a new Constitution to end military rule.

Many high-ranking former Confederates were not permitted and others chose not to vote for members of the Constitutional Convention of 1867–68, which included African-American delegates and abolitionist federal judge John Curtiss Underwood dominated. The Virginia Constitutional Convention of 1868 actually began its work in December 1867. Virginia newspapers and Conservatives, including Alexander H.H. Stuart, began criticizing the convention, particularly its African-American members, during that month.

Nonetheless, the Convention continued, and did include former Confederates as members. Major areas of debate concerned state administration, voting regulations, restrictions on officeholding by former Confederates, and social policies. During acrimonious sessions in early 1868, many Conservative members either left or were dismissed by the convention before it approved a draft in April, which needed to be approved by voters. The "Underwood Constitution" included "free schools for both races, equal rights provisions, and reforms of local government."

It also included controversial and very strict clauses concerning ex-Confederates, which were unpopular, so Virginia's military ruler during Congressional Reconstruction, General John Schofield, and later President-elect Ulysses S. Grant delayed the ratification vote for what turned out to be more than a year. Meanwhile, by the autumn of 1868, Virginia's Republican party split because of the anti-Confederate provisions. Governor Henry H. Wells (who succeeded Pierpont) argued that Unionists would be at risk in Virginia if the disabling clauses were removed from the proposed Virginia Constitution.

Stuart had appointed former Confederate general John Echols as part of a committee of three, along with F. G. Ruffin and James D. Johnston, which was to recommend eight other men to serve in the Committee of Nine. Echols would never formally become a member of the Committee of Nine, although he worked closely with Stuart to publish the "Senex" letter described below and set up the compromise.

By the end of 1868, Republicans who had been displeased with the final constitution approved by the convention joined forces with what formally became the Committee of Nine. These Republicans, such as Edgar Allan and Franklin Stearns, worked with the committee in Washington in the fight for a separate vote on the anti-Confederate provisions. They joined in meeting important Congressmen since the Republicans dominated the Congress at the time, and their work proved influential. Nonetheless, when the Congress reassembled in December 1868, the Virginia Republican executive committee requested a vote on the Underwood constitution. On December 9, the House Committee of Reconstruction passed a bill to provide money for the referendum, however, the Christmas holiday recess arrived before the Senate received the bill.

== Formal creation of Committee of Nine ==
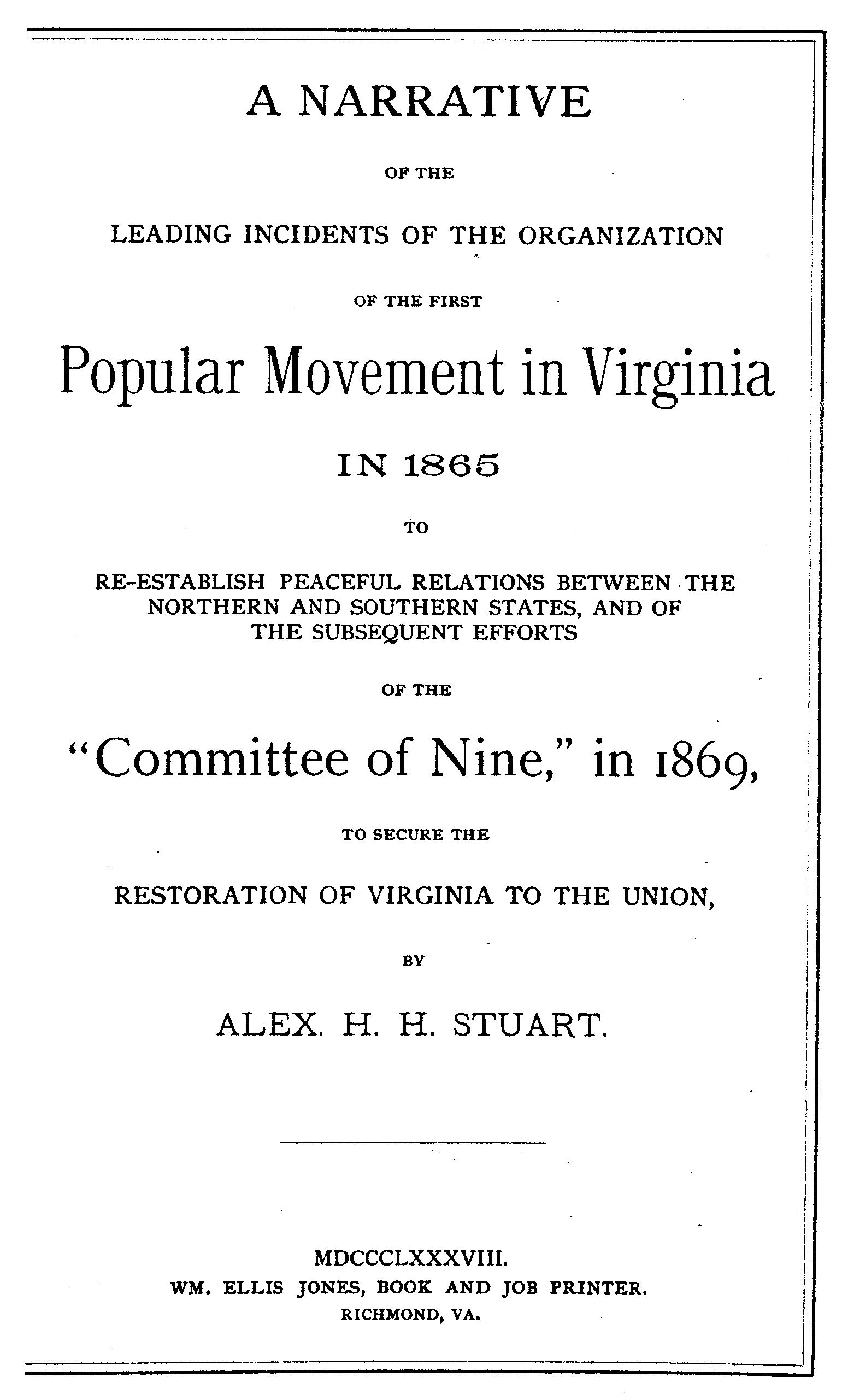
A narrative of the leading incidents of the organization of the first popular movement in Virginia in 1865 to re-establish peaceful relations between the northern and southern states, and the subsequent efforts of the "Committee of Nine," in 1869, to secure the restoration of Virginia to the Union.

Alexander H. H. Stuart wanted to get rid of the disenfranchisement clauses (which Conservatives particularly disliked, and moderate Republicans thought abrogated General Grant's terms given to Confederate General Robert E. Lee) before the referendum was held. Stuart wrote a letter to outline his plans and publicize his objections concerning the clauses. He argued for universal amnesty and for the creation of another constitution with the disenfranchisement clauses to present to the Congress. His letter was published in the Richmond papers under the pseudonym, "Senex."

In his work, "A narrative of the leading incidents of the organization of the first popular movement in Virginia in 1865 to re-establish peaceful relations between the northern and southern states, and the subsequent efforts of the "Committee of Nine," in 1869, to secure the restoration of Virginia to the Union", Alexander H. H. Stuart describes his motives behind writing and publishing the letter as following:

"I have no doubt that hundreds—nay, thousands—of my fellow-citizens thought and felt as I did as to the necessity of taking action on the subject. But no one seemed to be willing to assume the responsibility of taking the lead! Under these circumstances, as the necessity for moving in the matter was urgent, and the time within which action likely to lead to a successful result was limited to two weeks, I determined to sound a note of alarm by calling the attention of the people of Virginia to the frightful dangers which threatened them, and urging those who thought as I did to unite in an organized attempt to avert them. With this object in view, I wrote “a communication,” over the signature “Senex,” intended for publication in the Richmond Dispatch. This paper was written entirely on my own responsibility, and without conference or consultation with anyone. My purpose was to try and arouse the people to the necessity of immediate action, and to suggest as the most feasible, if not the only, means of obtaining relief from the disenfranchisement and test oaths embodied in the Underwood Constitution, the tender to Congress on behalf of Virginia of a compromise, on the basis of universal suffrage as an equivalent for universal amnesty."

== Campaign in Washington ==
Although some Conservatives criticized Stuart's letter, many moderates and centrist Virginians favored Stuart's plan. These Virginians met at the Exchange Hotel, in Richmond, on December 31, 1868, and January 1, 1869. Their meetings led to the creation of the Committee of Nine: Alexander H. H. Stuart would act as a chairman to a committee of nine people who would visit Washington to voice objections concerning the Underwood Constitution. The committee aimed to go to Washington to authorize separate votes on the proposed new state constitution, and the provision which continued to disenfranchise former Confederates (mostly white Virginians) under the Reconstruction Acts.

John L. Marye, of Fredericksburg, one of the members of the Committee of Nine, suggested that Stuart invite Gilbert C. Walker, a northerner and who had been "defeated for a seat in the Underwood convention", to help the committee gain support in Washington. As predicted, Walker, a northern Republican, helped the committee receive sympathy in the north. Horace Greeley's Republican newspaper, New York Tribune, joined the campaign. The Committee of Nine spent approximately two weeks in Washington. They met with congressmen and appeared before both the House and Senate committees.

Upon meeting with the Committee of Nine, and despite Governor Wells following the Committee of Nine and their supporters around in Washington, Congress approved the separation of the disabling clauses. However, in order to be readmitted, it required Virginia to ratify the Fifteenth Amendment as well.

== President Grant and the 1869 Virginia Gubernatorial Election ==
During meetings with members of the Committee of Nine in Washington, President-elect Grant showed sympathy towards the committee's objects and plans.

Grant was inaugurated on March 4, 1869. On May 14, 1869, President Grant issued the following proclamation:

“Every person who has been a Senator or Representative in Congress, or elector of President or Vice-President, or who held any office, civil or military, under the United States, or under any State, who, having previously taken an oath as a member of Congress, or as an officer of the United States, or as a member of any State Legislature, or as an executive or judicial officer of any State, shall have engaged in insurrection or rebellion against the same, or given aid or comfort to the enemies thereof.”

The committee thus achieved its goal of authorizing a separate vote for the provisions restricting former Confederates and sympathizers.

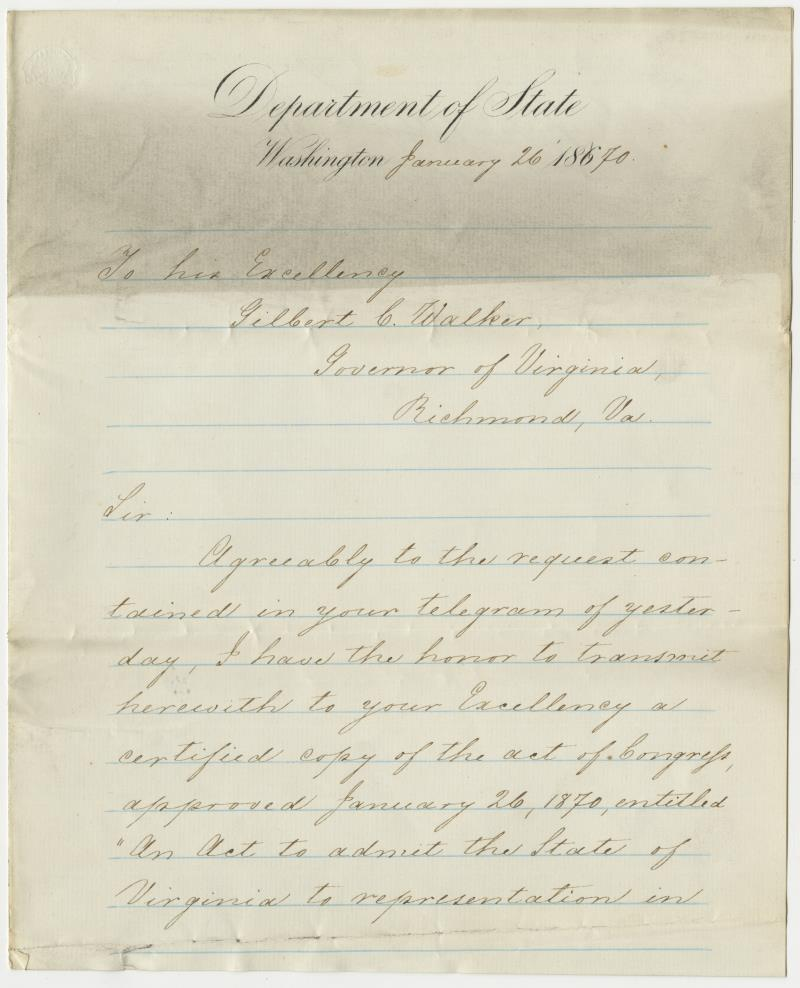
Letter Announcing Virginia's Readmission to the United States, 1870

Radical Republicans and Governor Wells (who became their candidate for actual election as Governor) wanted the referendum to take place as the convention had stated. They feared that the separate votes would lead to failure of the anti-Confederate provisions and thus restore conservative dominance in the state. In March 1869, Virginia Republicans held a convention to nominate candidates for the state elections.

Moderate Republicans were sometimes referred to as "Stearns Republicans", after Franklin Stearns, and also included William L. Owen, and Gilbert C. Walker. Although they failed to gain control of the Republican party, they nominated Walker, a former northern businessman as a moderate candidate. The alliance between the moderate Republicans and Conservatives led to Gilbert C. Walker winning the Gubernatorial Election of 1869.

Even though Radical Republicans, who had passed the Reconstruction Acts in 1866, still dominated the Congress, because the provisions of the new Constitution other than the anti-Confederate provisions passed overwhelmingly, Virginia was readmitted into the Union on January 26, 1870. Virginia's new Governor, Gilbert C. Walker, signed a letter announcing the readmission.

== Committee members ==
- Alexander H. H. Stuart, chairman

As the chairman, Stuart opened conferences when members appeared before federal legislators, as well as publicly set forth their objections to the Underwood Constitution.

- John Brown Baldwin, of Staunton

CSA Colonel Baldwin presented and elaborated on their views to the House and the Senate. He also wrote a paper requested by the Senate Judiciary Committee which explained the alterations the Committee of Nine wanted to make in the Underwood Constitution. All of the members signed the documents. Stuart stated that with this role, Baldwin became "the most conspicuous member of the committee."

- William T. Sutherlin, of Danville

CSA Colonel W. T. Sutherlin, of Danville, was among those who joined Alexander H. H. Stuart at the Exchange Hotel in Richmond, as was General Echols. After hearing Stuart's words, Sutherlin promised to work with them. Later, General Echols met with various newspapers to publish the "Senex" articles, although many refused, including Richmond Dispatch and Richmond Enquirer. After Sutherlin joined Echols to visit the Richmond Whig, editor Alexander Mosely agreed to publish them.

- James F. Johnston, of Bedford County
- John L. Marye, of Fredericksburg
- James Neeson, of Richmond
- William L. Owen, of Halifax County
- Wyndham Robertson, of Washington County
- J. F. Slaughter, of Lynchburg
