= Farley (Culpeper County, Virginia) =

Historic house in Virginia, United States

- U.S. National Register of Historic Places
- Virginia Landmarks Register
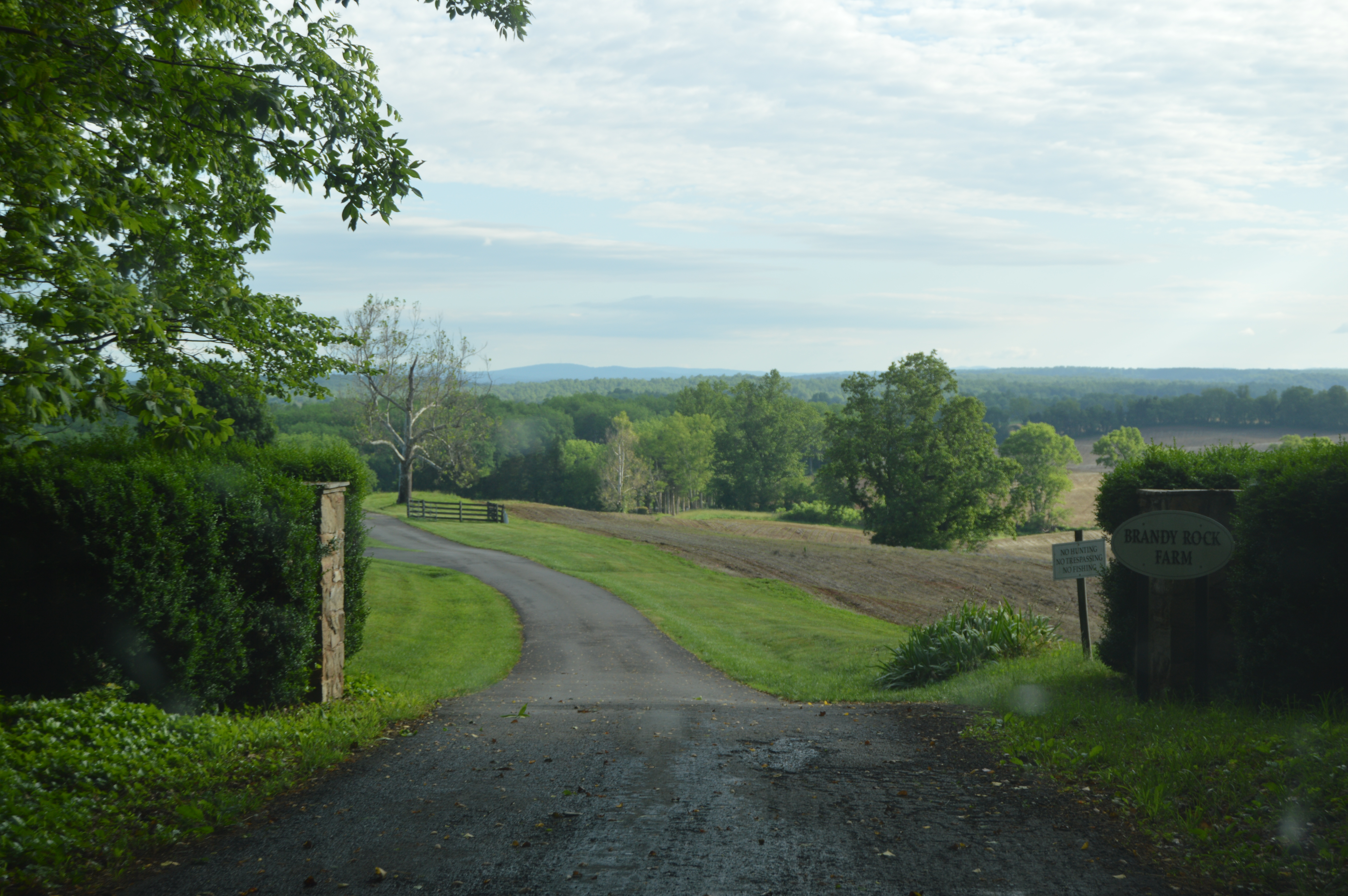
- Property entrance

- Location within Virginia Location within the United States
- Location: North of Brandy Station, Virginia, on VA 679 south of the Hazel River
- Coordinates: 38°32′29″N 77°53′42″W
- Area: 103 acres (42 ha)
- Built: 1801
- Architectural style: Federal, Adamesque
- NRHP reference No.: 76002100
- VLR No.: 023-0005

Significant dates
- Added to NRHP: May 6, 1976
- Designated VLR: October 21, 1975

Farley, previously named Sans Souci, is a historic home located near Brandy Station, Culpeper County, Virginia. It was built before 1800, purchased from Robert Beverly in 1801 by William Champe Carter and renamed Farley in honour of his wife, Maria Byrd Farley. It is a two-story, frame dwelling, nine bays across with two bay projecting pavilions at either end and a single-bay pavilion in the center. The house measures 96 feet long and 46 feet deep.

The house was purchased in 1863 by wealthy distiller and Unionist Franklin Stearns, who also owned the Stearns Block in Richmond, Virginia, and Tree Hill Plantation in Henrico County, Virginia. The same year, the house was used as headquarters for Union General John Sedgwick at the time of the Battle of Brandy Station.

Franklin Stearns gave it in 1870 to his son, Franklin Stearns Jr., as a present upon his marrying. They had nine children, including Franklin Stearns III, who operated the farm then continued the family's business. He married the daughter of prominent lawyer James W. Green (also the niece of West Virginia Supreme Court justice Thomas Claiborne Green as well as the head of the U.S. Fish Commission, Marshall McDonald) and had several children (including Franklin Stearns IV). Three of his sisters never married. One of them, Emily Palmer Stearns, became a prominent suffragette with Alice Paul in Washington, D.C., and later worked inspecting housing for war workers during World War II. She later retired to Farley, where she cared for many dogs and cats (pursuant to her vegetarian, no-kill philosophy) and became known as the "cat lady of Culpeper".

Farley was subsequently restored and listed on the National Register of Historic Places in 1976.
