= 1862 Virginia gubernatorial election =

- May 22, 1862
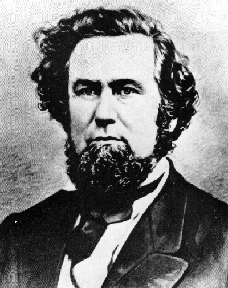
Nominee	Francis Harrison Pierpont
Party	Union
Popular vote	14,824
Percentage	100.00%
- County results Pierpont: >90% Unknown/No Votes
Governor before election
Francis Harrison Pierpont (disputed)
Union
Elected Governor
Francis Harrison Pierpont (disputed)
Union

The 1862 Virginia gubernatorial election was held on May 22, 1862, to elect the governor of the Restored Government of Virginia, whose authority represented the extent of pro–Union control in Virginia. At the time, the governorship of the state was disputed as a result of the American Civil War, and disputed incumbent Unionist Francis Harrison Pierpont ran unopposed.
