= Franklin Stearns =

American businessman and unionist (1815–1888)

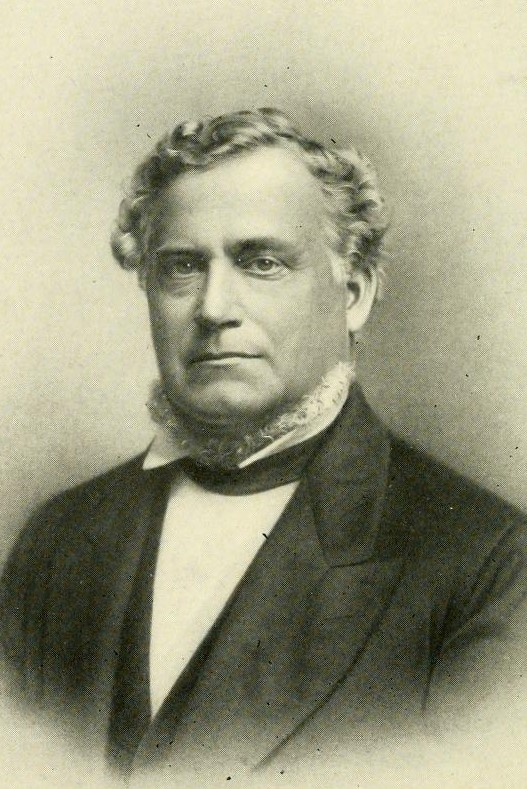

Member of the Virginia House of Delegates from Henrico County
- In office December 4, 1865 – March 3, 1866
- Preceded by: n/a
- Succeeded by: Z.S. McGruder

Personal details
- Born: March 3, 1815 Winhall, Vermont, U.S.
- Died: June 10, 1888 (aged 73) Richmond, Virginia, U.S.
- Resting place: Shockoe Hill Cemetery
- Spouse(s): Emma F. Haley; Caroline Virginia Willey
- Children: Franklin Stearns Jr., Irene Louise Stearns Halsey
- Occupation: distiller, real estate investor
- Known for: Unionist during the American Civil War, post-war reconciliation

Franklin Stearns (March 3, 1815 – June 10, 1888), was an American businessman who moved to Richmond, Virginia, and became one of the city's leading Unionists, for which he was imprisoned several times during the American Civil War. When Union forces captured the Confederate capital in April 1865, Richmond's mayor delivered the city's note of surrender to Union forces at Stearns' farm, Tree Hill which may become a park after development is completed. After the war, Stearns worked to restore Richmond, and three of his properties remain today, and are on the National Register of Historic Places.

== Early and family life ==
Born on March 3, 1815, to farmer and merchant Simeon Stearns and his wife Irene Newcomb in Winhall, Vermont. When Franklin was 13, Simeon Stearns moved his family to Madison County, New York.

When he was 18, Franklin Stearns moved to Richmond, Virginia and worked on the James River Canal. He married Emmy F. Haley (1818–1845), and they had one child, Zenus "Zeny" Barnum Stearns (1845–1890). On September 2, 1847, Franklin Stearns remarried, to Caroline Virginia Willey Stearns (1820 - 1877), and they had six children, of whom only Franklin Stearns Jr. (1848 - 1898) survived both parents. When Franklin Jr. returned from Paris after the American Civil War, he married Emily Palmer of New York, they received Farley farm as a wedding present from his father. Franklin Stearns' son Erastus Willey Stearns (1852–1878), married Caroline Poe of Orange County, and had a son Erastus Willey Stearns Jr. (1877–1929). Their sons Daniel (b. 1850), Allen (b. 1855) and Luther (b. 1859) all died in childhood. Franklin Stearns' daughter Irene "Rena" Louisa Stearns (1854–1886) married Jeremiah Morton Halsey and had six children, of whom three survived into adulthood.

== Career ==
Stearns worked as an overseer for a Georgia railroad in 1836 and the next year moved to Richmond, Virginia, to work in a quarry for the James River and Kanawha Canal. By 1843 he was a contractor helping to build the canal, and switched to more mercantile pursuits. He operated a distillery and wine bottling plant, and became a leading member of the Chamber of Commerce and one of the state's largest land owners. The 1860 U.S. census listed Stearns as owning $155,000 in real estate and $200,000 in personal property. His distillery stood on 15th St. between Main and Cary streets in downtown Richmond. His country estate "Tree Hill Farm" in Henrico County outside the city limits overlooked both the city and the James River and stood near the intersection of the important Osborne turnpike and New Market road.

During the American Civil War, Confederate provost John H. Winder considered Stearns a traitor to the Confederacy, and placed him in jail with John Minor Botts, or later house arrest in his Richmond warehouse (where his family could care for him). Evidence that Stearns was disloyal to the Confederate cause was collected after the arrest of the Universalist Church's Reverend Alden Bosserman who admitted to authorities that Stearns had advised him against opening his church on the day after the Manassas battle which was seen as not supportive of the cause. Stearns was also the largest donor to Bosserman's church. Stearns' younger brother William moved to DuPage County, Illinois (where their brother Daniel lived) to avoid the conflict, and Stearns sent his two older sons out of the country so they would not be conscripted into the Confederate army. However, Stearns let the Confederate Chimborazo Hospital use Tree Hill farm to graze its livestock.

On the night of April 1, 1865, as downtown Richmond burned due to fires set by evacuating Confederate troops, Richmond mayor Joseph Mayo traveled to Tree Hill farm to deliver a surrender note to two Union majors he found encamped there, with Union troops. They conveyed the note to Major General Godfrey Weitzel, who traveled to City Hall to accept the Confederate Capitol's formal surrender document at 8:15 a.m. Union troops also stopped the fires and restored order).

After the war, the U.S. Marshall ordered Stearns' Richmond bank account frozen, which prompted a note from Virginia's Provisional Governor Francis H. Pierpont to President Andrew Johnson, attached to a formal pardon application on Stearns' behalf. On July 18, 1865, Stearns received a pardon from President Andrew Johnson for his activities which aided the Confederacy, conditioned upon him never acquiring any slaves or using slave labor. He also was elected to the Virginia General Assembly to represent Henrico County, along with J.J. White. He served in the first session (December 4, 1865 – March 3, 1866) but was replaced by Z. S. McGruder for the session which began on December 3, 1866.

Stearns acquired what had once been the Planter's Bank Building on Richmond's Main Street, and in 1868 erected rental housing and commercial office space, which was nicknamed the Stearns block. The city's circuit court was held there beginning in 1870. His grandchildren's estate sold the property in 1923; the remaining iron front was noted in the Historic American Buildings Survey, and remains today. Stearns was also a director of several banks, and of the James River and Kanawha Canal Company, the Richmond and York River Railroad and the Chesapeake and Ohio Railway. According to family accounts, Stearns refused to become involved in politics, declining to run in 1867 to become a delegate to Virginia's constitutional convention, and later when offered a position as U.S. Senator and even Governor.

In 1869, Stearns traveled to Washington, D.C., to meet with General Grant, provisional governor Henry H. Wells, fellow Conservative Republican Gilbert C. Walker of Norfolk and the Committee of Nine to discuss the future political status of Confederate veterans. Many with more Confederate involvement than Stearns had also received pardons and restoration of their civil rights after surrendering and signing loyalty oaths. However, Virginia needed to adopt a new state Constitution (without the slavery provisions of the 1851 constitution) in order to be readmitted to the Union. The Constitutional Convention of 1868-69 drafted a new constitution pending voter approval, which contained a highly controversial provision barring former Confederates from holding office. Upon General Grant's recommendation after the meetings, occupying General John Schofield permitted Virginia's voters (of all races) to vote separately on the constitution (which passed overwhelmingly) and the disenfranchisement provision (which failed). However, over the next decades, the former Confederates then enacted Jim Crow laws which disenfranchised the former slaves.

== Death and legacy ==
Stearns died in Richmond on June 10, 1888, survived by his sons Zenus Stearns and Franklin Stearns Jr. (who had nine children) and three grandchildren by his daughter Irena Louisa Stearns Halsey. Franklin Stearns was buried in Shockoe Hill Cemetery, as had been mayor Mayo, his fellow Unionist John Minor Botts, and later would be Elizabeth Van Lew, although three of his sons and his only daughter would be buried at Hollywood cemetery.

His grandson Franklin Stearns III continued the family's business, and married the daughter of prominent lawyer James W. Green (also the niece of West Virginia Supreme Court justice Thomas Claiborne Green as well as the head of the U.S. Fish Commission, Marshall McDonald) and had several children (including Franklin Stearns IV). His granddaughter Emily Palmer Stearns became a prominent suffragette with Alice Paul in Washington, D.C., and worked inspecting housing for war workers during World War II. She never married, and later retired to their Culpeper farm, Farley, where she cared for many dogs and cats (pursuant to her vegetarian, no-kill philosophy) but could not travel when elderly to continue the family's involvement in Episcopal Church activities. Tree Hill Farm, the Iron Front Building in Richmond, and Farley are on the National Register for Historic Places.
