= Julia Robertson Pierpont =

First Lady of Virginia

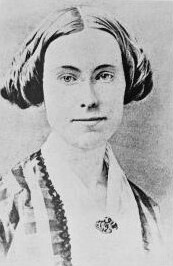
- Photograph circa 1863

First Lady of Virginia
- In role May 15, 1861 – April 4, 1868
- Governor: Francis Harrison Pierpont
- Preceded by: Susan Holt Letcher
- Succeeded by: Olive E. Evans

Personal details
- Born: Julia Augusta Robertson; July 28, 1828 Dryden, New York, U.S.
- Died: March 25, 1886 (aged 57)
- Resting place: Woodlawn Cemetery; Fairmont, West Virginia
- Spouse: Francis Harrison Pierpont
- Children: 4

Julia Augusta Pierpont (née Robertson; July 28, 1828 – March 25, 1886) was the first lady of Virginia from 1861 to 1868 as the wife of Governor of Virginia Francis Harrison Pierpont. She is credited by some as an early founder and adopter of "Decoration Day" (now known as Memorial Day) in the United States, and has been referred to as "The Mother of West Virginia" due to her husband's founding role in the state's history.

== Early life and family ==
Julia Augusta Robertson was born on July 28, 1828, in Dryden, New York, the daughter of a Presbyterian minister, Reverend Samuel Robertson, and Dorcas Platt, who was a descendant of Richard Platt, one of the founders of New Haven, Connecticut.

She was born into a family of abolitionists and developed strong anti-slavery views as a young woman. In 1847, she graduated from a Washington Female Seminary in Pennsylvania.

=== Marriage and children ===
In 1854, she married Francis Harrison Pierpont while she was working as governess to his neighbor, Thomas Haymond.

They spent their honeymoon at the Willard Hotel in Washington, D.C. They also called on President Franklin Pierce with whom they had a private audience. They had four children, including:

- Samuel Robertson Pierpont (1855–1920)
- Anna Pierpont Siviter (1855–1932)
- Mary Augusta "Mamie" Pierpont (1860–1864)
- Francis W. Pierpont (1860–1920)

== Public life ==
Before being married to Francis, she worked as a schoolteacher in Newville, Pennsylvania. After becoming married, Pierpont supported her husband in his political career, including his antislavery and pro-Union campaigns throughout northwestern Virginia.

=== First lady ===
When her husband was elected unanimously as the governor of the Restored Government of Virginia, she became Virginia's first lady. She moved with her husband to Wheeling (the capital of the restored government at the time) and later to Alexandria in 1863 when the state government relocated there. During the Civil War, Pierpont served the Union cause by helping to manufacture and send flags and supplies to servicemembers. After the Civil War, she moved with her husband to Richmond, where he continued to serve as governor during the early years of Reconstruction.

In May 1866, Pierpont and a teacher from a local African American school cleaned the neglected graves of Union soldiers in Hollywood Cemetery in Richmond, Virginia, and decorated them with flowers. It may have been Pierpont's actions that partially inspired General John A. Logan, Commander-in-Chief of the Grand Army of the Republic to declare May 30 to be Decoration Day. Pierpont was also the first West Virginia woman to be made a member of the Grand Army of the Republic.

== Death and legacy ==
Pierpont died on March 25, 1886, aged 57. She is buried alongside her husband in Woodlawn Cemetery.

=== Legacy ===
In 1937, the West Virginia legislature voted to erect a monument to Pierpont at her grave. In 1987 a project by West Virginia University's Public History Program and the West Virginia Women's Commission established Pierpont as the originator of the state's annual celebration of Memorial Day. In 2017, as part of the Civil War sesquicentennial, the West Virginia Archives and History installed a highway historical marker dedicated to Pierpont. It stands along Adams Street in downtown Fairmont. The City of Fairmont, Marion County, and the state of West Virginia officially celebrate "Julia Pierpont Day" on the Saturday before Memorial Day.

Pierpont, along with her husband, are jointly the namesakes of Pierpont Community and Technical College (renamed in their honor in 2006), and the namesakes of the Julia Pierpont and Francis H. Pierpont awards at the college. Ceramic and glassware items owned by Pierpont are in the permanent collection of the West Virginia and Regional History Center. The letters of Pierpont and her pocket diary are in the West Virginia Archives.

== In popular culture ==
Pierpont is a character in the television miniseries 1863, played by Amanda Loveless. She is also portrayed by JoAnn Peterson in the 2013 public television documentary, West Virginia: Road to Statehood.
