= William H. Roane =

American politician

William Henry Roane
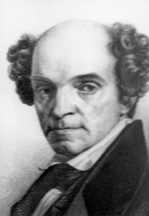

United States Senator from Virginia
- In office March 14, 1837 – March 3, 1841
- Preceded by: Richard E. Parker
- Succeeded by: William S. Archer

Member of the U.S. House of Representatives from Virginia's 12th district
- In office March 4, 1815 – March 3, 1817
- Preceded by: John Roane
- Succeeded by: Robert S. Garnett

Member of the Virginia House of Delegates
- In office 1812-1815

Personal details
- Born: September 17, 1787 Hanover County, Virginia, U.S.
- Died: May 11, 1845 (aged 57) Tree Hill, Richmond, Virginia, U.S.
- Party: Democratic-Republican, Democratic
- Education: College of William & Mary
- Profession: Politician

William Henry Roane (September 17, 1787 – May 11, 1845) was a lawyer and politician from Virginia who served in the Virginia House of Delegates, the United States House of Representatives, and the United States Senate. He is the most known and longest serving of five related men named "William Roane" who served in the Virginia General Assembly.

== Early life and education ==
Born in Hanover County, Virginia, to Anne Henry, daughter of Founding Father Patrick Henry, and her lawyer and planter husband Spencer Roane. His father began his judicial career during this boy's youth and moved to the state capital, Richmond. William received an education appropriate to his class. In 1804 he began studies at the College of William & Mary in Williamsburg.

== Career ==
W.H. Roane read law, was admitted to the Virginia bar, and began a legal practice in Tidewater Virginia. Like his father and several ancestors also named "William Roane", he also operated plantations using enslaved labor. As an adult, he bought a plantation called Tree Hill, Virginia near Richmond, originally constructed by the Selden family of Virginia.

Roane began his legislative career by winning election to the part-time position of representing King and Queen County in the Virginia House of Delegates. He served from 1812 to 1815, during the War of 1812.

In late 1814 Roane began his federal legislative career winning election as a Democratic-Republican to the United States House of Representatives, and served a single term, from 1815 to 1817. Roane did not seek reelection, for Virginia legislators had elected him to the state's executive council, another full-time paid position.

More than two decades later, Roane again sought to represent Virginia in the national legislature. This time he won election as a Democrat to the United States Senate to fill a vacancy, serving from 1837 to 1841. There, he was chairman of the Committee on the District of Columbia from 1837 to 1839. After an unsuccessful bid for reelection, Roane engaged in agricultural pursuits until his death on May 11, 1845, in Tree Hill, Virginia.

== Death and legacy ==
Roane died at Tree Hill, but his remains were transferred to the Lyons Family Cemetery in Hanover County, Virginia. About a decade after Roane's death, Tree Hill was acquired by Richmond merchant Franklin Stearns, who became a prominent Unionist during the American Civil War. It was designated a Virginia Landmark in 1974 and also placed on the National Register of Historic Places.

U.S. House of Representatives
Preceded by John Roane	Member of the U.S. House of Representatives from Virginia's 12th congressional district March 4, 1815 – March 3, 1817	Succeeded by Robert S. Garnett
U.S. Senate
Preceded by Richard E. Parker	U.S. senator (Class 2) from Virginia; March 14, 1837 – March 3, 1841; Served alongside: William C. Rives	Succeeded by William S. Archer
