= Virginia Convention (disambiguation) =

Virginia Convention in Revolutionary historiography refers to one of the five sessions of the Patriot legislature of Virginia:

- First Virginia Convention, held in Williamsburg, Virginia in 1774
- Second Virginia Convention, held in Richmond, Virginia in 1775
- Third Virginia Convention, held in Richmond, Virginia in 1775
- Fourth Virginia Convention, held in Williamsburg, Virginia in 1775
- Fifth Virginia Convention, held in Williamsburg, Virginia in 1776

It may also refer to any of the following Conventions in other historical eras:

- Virginia Ratifying Convention, convention to reject or ratify the United States Constitution
- Virginia Constitutional Convention of 1829–1830, constitutional convention
- Virginia Constitutional Convention of 1850, constitutional convention
- Virginia Secession Convention of 1861, convention to decide whether to secede from the United States
- Wheeling Convention, convention to reject the Virginia |ordinance of secession and establish the Unionist Restored Government of Virginia
- Virginia Loyalist Convention of 1864, constitutional convention for the Restored Government of Virginia
- Virginia Constitutional Convention of 1868, constitutional convention
- Virginia Constitutional Convention of 1902, constitutional convention
