= John B. Hoge =

American politician

John Blair Hoge
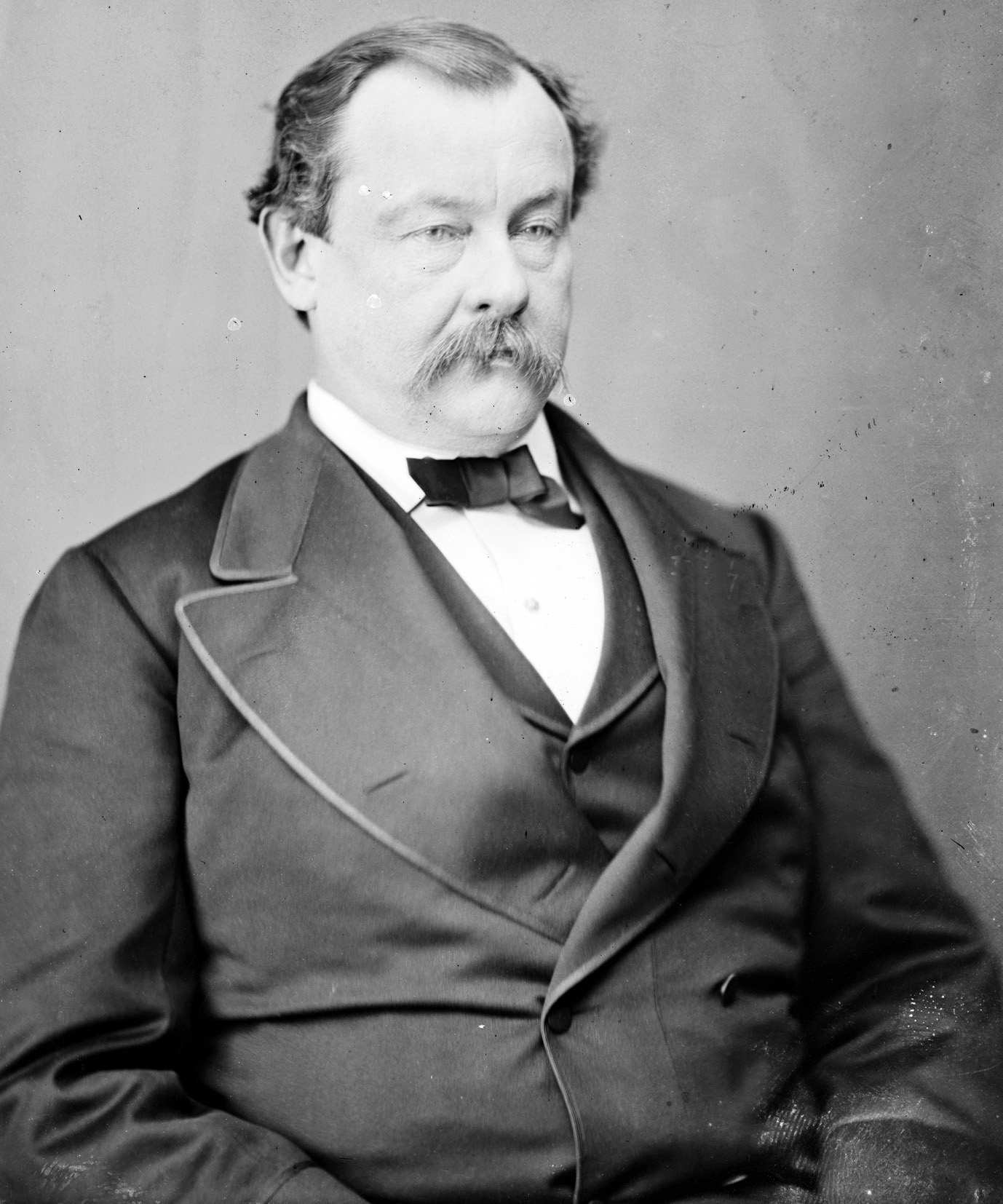

Member of the U.S. House of Representatives from West Virginia's 2nd district
- In office March 4, 1881 – March 3, 1883

Personal details
- Born: February 2, 1825 Richmond, Virginia, US
- Died: March 1, 1896 (aged 71) Martinsburg, West Virginia, US
- Party: Democratic
- Profession: Journalist, Lawyer

Military service
- Allegiance: Confederate States
- Branch/service: Confederate States Army
- Rank: Captain
- Unit: 1st Virginia Cavalry
- Battles/wars: American Civil War

John Blair Hoge (February 2, 1825 – March 1, 1896) was an American journalist, lawyer, and Democratic politician who served as a United States representative from West Virginia. He was a member of the 47th United States Congress.

== Biography ==
Hoge was born in Richmond, Virginia, on February 2, 1825. After studying law, he was admitted to the bar in April 1845 and entered practice in Martinsburg. He was chosen president of the Bank of Berkeley, Virginia (now West Virginia), in 1853. He served in the Virginia House of Delegates from 1855 to 1859. He was chosen as a delegate to the Democratic National Conventions at Charleston and Baltimore in 1860. During the American Civil War, he served in the Confederate Army as both a line and staff officer until paroled in 1865.

He worked as a journalist and resumed his law practice in Martinsburg, West Virginia, in 1870. He served as a delegate to the State constitutional convention in 1872. He was chosen to serve as a member of the Democratic National Committee from 1872 to 1876. He served as a judge on the third judicial circuit in 1872. He resigned in August 1880 to run for Congress. He was elected from West Virginia's 2nd District in 1880 to the Forty-seventh Congress (March 4, 1881 – March 3, 1883). Subsequently, he served as United States Attorney for the District of Columbia from 1885 to 1889. He died in Martinsburg on March 1, 1896.

== See also ==
- West Virginia's congressional delegations

== Sources ==
- United States Congress. "John B. Hoge (id: H000696)". Biographical Directory of the United States Congress.

U.S. House of Representatives
Preceded by Benjamin F. Martin	Member of the U.S. House of Representatives from West Virginia's 2nd congressional district 1881–1883	Succeeded by William Lyne Wilson
