= Benjamin F. Martin =

American politician (1828–1895)

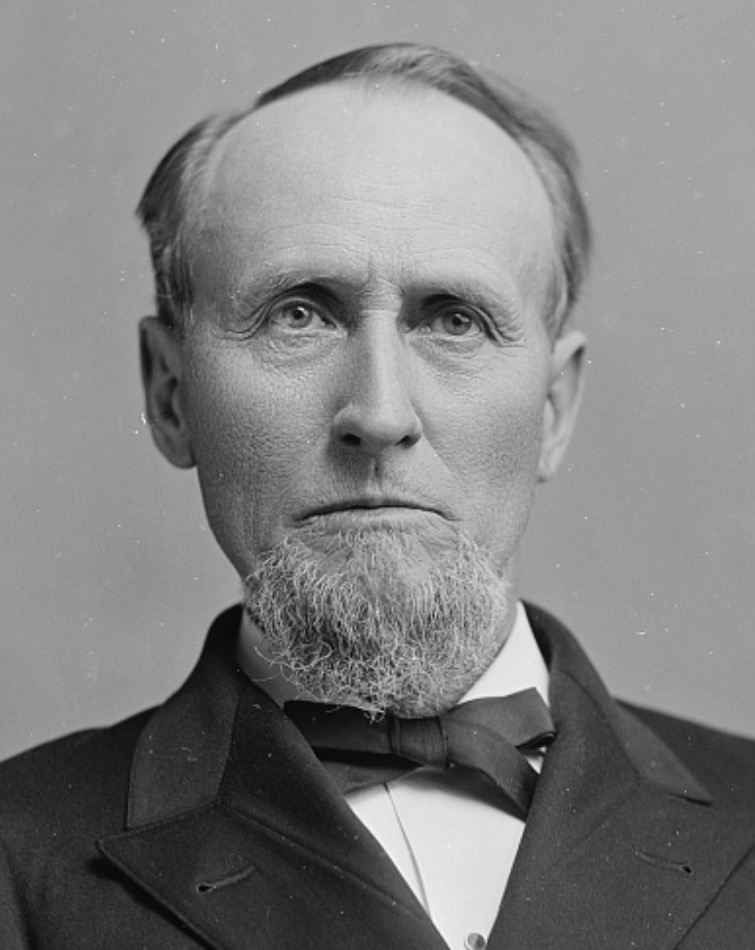
- Portrait of Martin by Charles Milton Bell, taken between 1865 and 1880

Member of the U.S. House of Representatives from West Virginia's 2nd district
- In office March 4, 1877 – March 3, 1881
- Preceded by: Charles J. Faulkner
- Succeeded by: John B. Hoge

Personal details
- Born: Benjamin Franklin Martin; October 2, 1828 Farmington, Virginia, US
- Died: January 20, 1895 (aged 66) Grafton, West Virginia
- Resting place: Woodlawn Cemetery
- Party: Democratic
- Occupation: Politician

Benjamin Franklin Martin (October 2, 1828 – January 20, 1895) was an American politician. A Democrat, he was a member of the United States House of Representatives from West Virginia.

== Biography ==
Martin was born on October 2, 1828, in Farmington, Virginia (now West Virginia). He was presumably named for polymath Benjamin Franklin. In June 1854, he graduated from Allegheny College, after which he worked as an educator in Fairmont. He studied law, being admitted to the bar and commencing practice in March 1856. Also in 1856, he moved to Pruntytown. For a time, he was president of the Grafton and Greenbrier Railroad.

Martin was a Democrat. He was a delegate to the 1872 West Virginia Constitutional Convention. He was also a delegate to the 1872 and 1888 Democratic National Conventions. In 1872, he unsuccessfully ran for West Virginia's 2nd district of the United States House of Representatives. He served in the House from March 4, 1877, to March 3, 1881, representing the 2nd district. In Congress, he was a member of the Committee on Private Land Claims and On the Pacific Railroad. He was not nominated for the following election. He was a Presidential Elector in 1884, as which he voted for Grover Cleveland and Thomas A. Hendricks. Politically, he leaned liberal and was loyal to his party.

After serving in Congress, Martin returned to practicing law, in Grafton. He was a member of the Methodist Episcopal Church. He died on January 20, 1895, aged 66, in Grafton. He was buried at Woodlawn Cemetery. Since 1970, an archive of his paper has been held by West Virginia University.

U.S. House of Representatives
Preceded by Charles J. Faulkner	Member of the U.S. House of Representatives from West Virginia's 2nd congressional district March 4, 1877 – March 3, 1881	Succeeded by John B. Hoge
