= Henry H. Wells =

American politician (1823–1900)

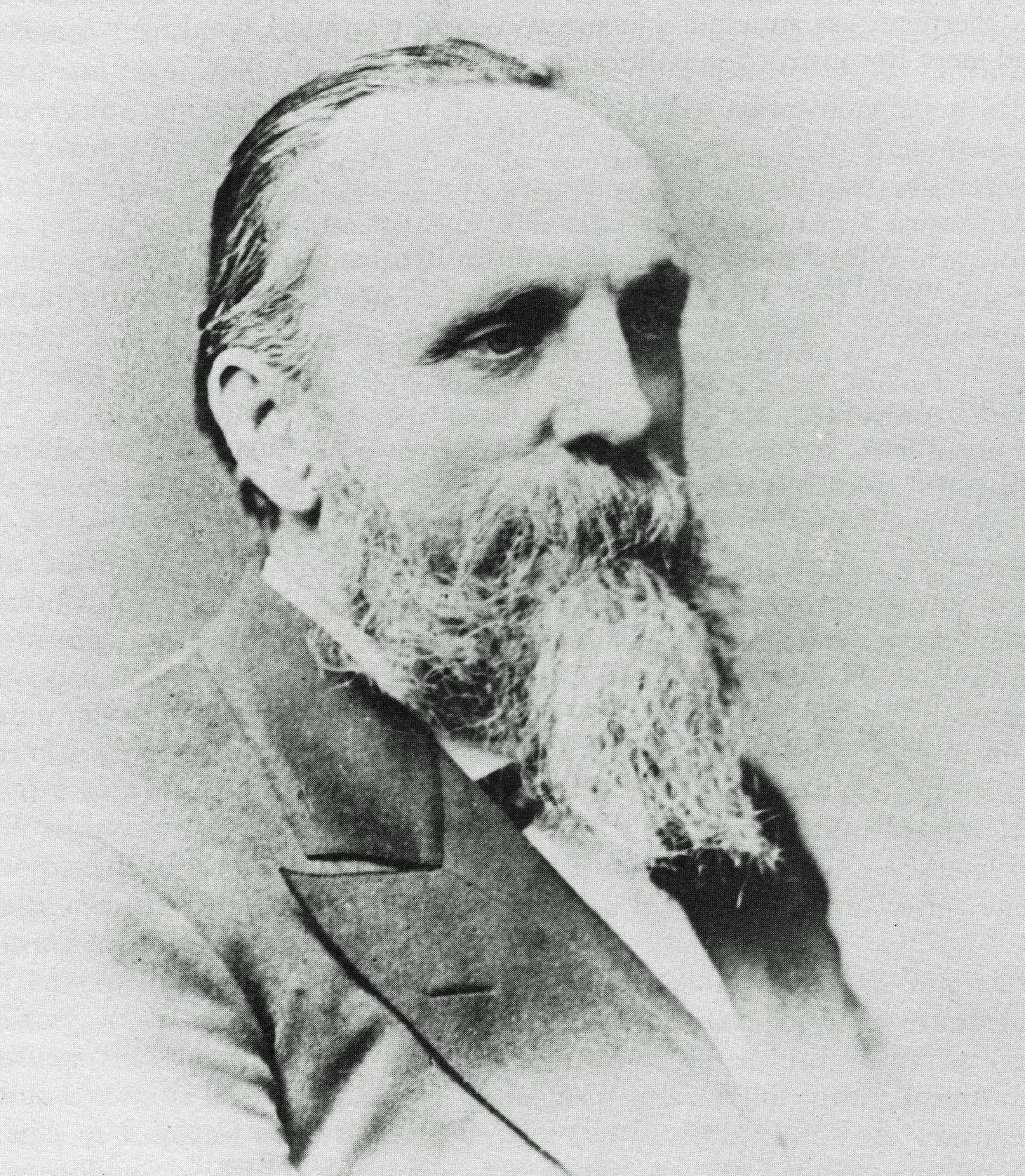

Provisional Governor of Virginia
- In office April 4, 1868 – September 21, 1869
- Lieutenant: Leopold Copeland Parker Cowper
- Preceded by: Francis Harrison Pierpont as Unionist Governor
- Succeeded by: Gilbert Carlton Walker as Governor

Personal details
- Born: Henry Horatio Wells; September 17, 1823 Rochester, New York, U.S.
- Died: February 12, 1900 (aged 76) Palmyra, New York, U.S.
- Resting place: Rock Creek Cemetery; Washington, D.C., U.S.
- Party: Republican
- Profession: Politician, Lawyer

Military service
- Allegiance: United States of America
- Branch/service: United States Army Military Police
- Years of service: 1862–1865
- Rank: Colonel (USV)
- Unit: 26th Michigan Infantry
- Commands: 26th Michigan Infantry
- Battles/wars: American Civil War

Henry Horatio Wells (September 17, 1823 – February 12, 1900) was an American lawyer and Union Army officer in the American Civil War, succeeded Francis Harrison Pierpont as the appointed provisional governor of Virginia from 1868 to 1869 during Reconstruction. A Radical Republican labelled a carpetbagger, Wells was defeated for election in 1869 by Gilbert C. Walker, who also became his appointed successor. Wells then served as U.S. Attorney for Virginia and later for the District of Columbia.

== Early and family life ==
Henry Wells was born in Rochester, New York, and raised in Detroit, Michigan. He attended Romeo Academy and studied law with Theodore Romeyn.

In 1848, Wells married Millicent Hunt of Detroit, with whom he had a son and a daughter before she died after giving birth to that short-lived daughter in 1852. In 1854, Wells married Phoebe Higby, and they had a daughter.

== Michigan legal and political career ==
Wells was admitted to the Michigan bar circa 1846. In his private legal practice, Wells defended men accused of assisting fugitive slaves.

Wells joined the new Republican Party and ran for office. Voters later elected Wells to the Michigan House of Representatives. He served one term (1854–1856) and advocated temperance, free public schools, abolition of slavery, and extending civil and political rights to African Americans.

== Military career ==
During the American Civil War, Wells received a commission as a major in the 26th Michigan Infantry and was soon promoted to lieutenant colonel. His unit was assigned to Alexandria, Virginia, to occupy that city in the controlled part of the Union Army of Virginia. As provost marshal since February 1863 (and full colonel as of March 30, 1864), Wells led military police in Alexandria and soon supervised law enforcement in all Union-controlled territory south of the Potomac River.

Francis Harrison Pierpont (who helped establish West Virginia in 1861) was appointed governor of Union-controlled parts of Virginia during the war and made Alexandria his headquarters. Fellow abolitionist John Curtiss Underwood became the U.S. District Judge stationed in Alexandria.

After President Abraham Lincoln's assassination in April 1865, Wells played an important role in pursuing and apprehending the assassin, John Wilkes Booth, in a barn in Caroline County, Virginia. Wells had interrogated Dr. Samuel Mudd, which had led to the crucial tip. He was also associated with the proceedings before Judge Underwood in which the captured Jefferson Davis was charged with treason (although that prosecution was later quashed). Wells received a promotion to brevet brigadier general in May 1865.

On May 9, 1865, Virginia's Confederate Governor General William Smith was arrested, and President Andrew Johnson appointed Pierpont as Virginia's provisional governor. Pierpont moved the state government's seat back to Richmond, but it became unpopular. In 1864, Pierpont called a constitutional convention in Alexandria that abolished slavery. That constitution was thus temporarily extended to the entire state until a new constitution (without the slavery provisions in Virginia's Constitution of 1850) could be drafted and adopted.

== Political career ==
After ending his military service on September 21, 1865, Wells resumed private legal practice. He remained in Alexandria and was active in the Alexandria Canal Company and then the Alexandria Canal, Railroad, and Bridge Company, which constructed a canal in what became Arlington, Virginia, and a bridge to Georgetown (Washington, D.C.). He associated with Judge Underwood and local Alexandria attorney S. Ferguson Beach, who held Radical Republican views. Wells firmly supported recognizing the civil rights of African Americans.

In 1866, the Radical Republicans in Congress won large majorities and soon took charge. They closed down the state's civilian government and put Virginia (and nine other former Confederate states) under military rule. Virginia was administered as the "First Military District" in 1867–69 under General John Schofield. Schofield oversaw the transition to civilian rule after Virginia's voters (including freedmen) selected delegates to write a constitution to succeed the 1864 document (and the 1850 Virginia Constitution, which explicitly recognized and permitted slavery). The convention (which included 20 African American delegates) began meeting on December 3, 1867. Delegates elected Judge Underwood, their president, and Rev. James W. Hunnicutt to head the committee on suffrage. Wells and Hunnicutt wanted to protect Black voting rights and disenfranchise Confederate veterans and sympathizers.

Other Virginians, who had previously been politically active and supported the Confederate government, met in December 1867. Led by Alexander H.H. Stuart of Staunton, they established the Conservative Party of Virginia to oppose whatever the Underwood Convention proposed. Another opposition leader was William Mahone (1826–1895), a railroad president and former Confederate general who said it was time for a New Departure for the state's Conservative Party (it merged with the Democratic Party in 1883). Nonetheless, whites had to accept the results of the war, including civil rights and the vote for freedmen.

Governor Pierpont had become unpopular with all sides. On April 4, 1868, General Schofield removed him and appointed his friend Wells in his place. On May 6 and 7, 1868, Virginia's Republican convention nominated Wells for governor on a ticket with James H. Clements for lieutenant governor and Thomas R. Bowden for attorney general. The Conservatives nominated Robert E. Withers. However, the new constitution needed to be ratified before such an election could be held, and the provisions disenfranchising former Confederates were controversial. General Schofield postponed the scheduled June 2, 1868 ratification vote.

On Christmas Day, 1868, both Richmond newspapers published a letter from Stuart advocating "universal amnesty." General Ulysses S. Grant and influential Republican Congressmen had met with Virginia's Conservative leaders (including the Committee of Nine formed about a week after Stuart's letter), as well as Wells and his allies, and Gilbert C. Walker (another former Northerner turned Norfolk businessman) and Franklin Stearns of Richmond). Grant intervened and supported Schofield in protecting the voting rights of Confederate veterans. The multiple federally supervised Virginia elections in 1869 thus included a vote on the new state constitution, a separate one on its disfranchisement clause that would have stripped the vote from most former Confederates, and a separate vote for state officials.

Republicans again nominated Wells for Virginia's governor in March 1869 on a ticket with Black physician J.D. Harris for lieutenant governor. However, in 1869, on July 6, 1869, voters selected Gilbert C. Walker, who had support from Mahone's "True Republicans" and the Conservatives, by a vote of 119,535 to 101,204. Voters also resoundingly rejected the Confederate disfranchisement clause. Thus, Virginia became the only Southern state that did not have a civilian Radical government during Reconstruction.

Wells gave up his office on September 21, 1869, and Schofield appointed Walker, as his successor until the newly elected governor's swearing-in on January 1, 1870.

== Later career ==
Wells sought a federal judgeship but was unsuccessful. As an attorney with former governor Henry A. Wise (who had opposed Negro suffrage) in the April 1870 trial to decide whether George Chahoon or Henry K. Ellyson had become Richmond's mayor, Wells was among 300 people in attendance at the Court of Appeals session in Richmond on April 27, 1870. An overcrowded balcony collapsed, as did the courtroom's floor, which both fell into the hall of the Virginia House of Delegates. About 60 people died, and over a hundred people sustained serious injuries. Wells suffered several broken ribs.

President Grant nominated Wells as United States Attorney for the Eastern District of Virginia. On May 28, 1870, the Senate approved Wells' nomination, and he served until 1872.

Wells then moved to Washington, D.C., and resumed private legal practice. He served as United States Attorney for the District of Columbia from September 1875 until January 1880. He then continued a private legal practice with his son Henry Hunt Wells, who had been his deputy U.S. Attorney but who died in early 1894. Meanwhile, Wells had helped found the American Bar Association in 1878.

== Death and legacy ==
Wells finally retired in 1895, after his wife Phoebe Higby Wells had died on July 20, 1893, and his health was failing. At some point, he travelled to what later became known as Hawaii and may have accompanied a friend on an around-the-world trip.

On February 12, 1900, Wells died in his daughter's home in Palmyra, New York. He was buried beside his wife in the Rock Creek Cemetery, located in Washington, D.C. The Library of Virginia has many of his papers.

== See also ==
- Lowe, Richard. Republicans and Reconstruction in Virginia, 1865–70 (1991)
- Maddex Jr., Jack P. The Virginia Conservatives, 1867–1879: A Study in Reconstruction Politics (1970).
- Robert Sobel and John Raimo (ed.): Biographical Directory of the Governors of the United States, 1789–1978. Volume 4, Meckler Books, Westport, 1978. 4 volumes.

Party political offices
Preceded by Francis Harrison Pierpont	Republican nominee for Governor of Virginia; 1869	Succeeded by Robert William Hughes
Political offices
Preceded by Francis Harrison Pierpont; Unionist Governor	Governor of Virginia; 1868–1869	Succeeded by Gilbert Carlton Walker; Governor
