= William L. Owen =

American businessman and politician (1809–1881)

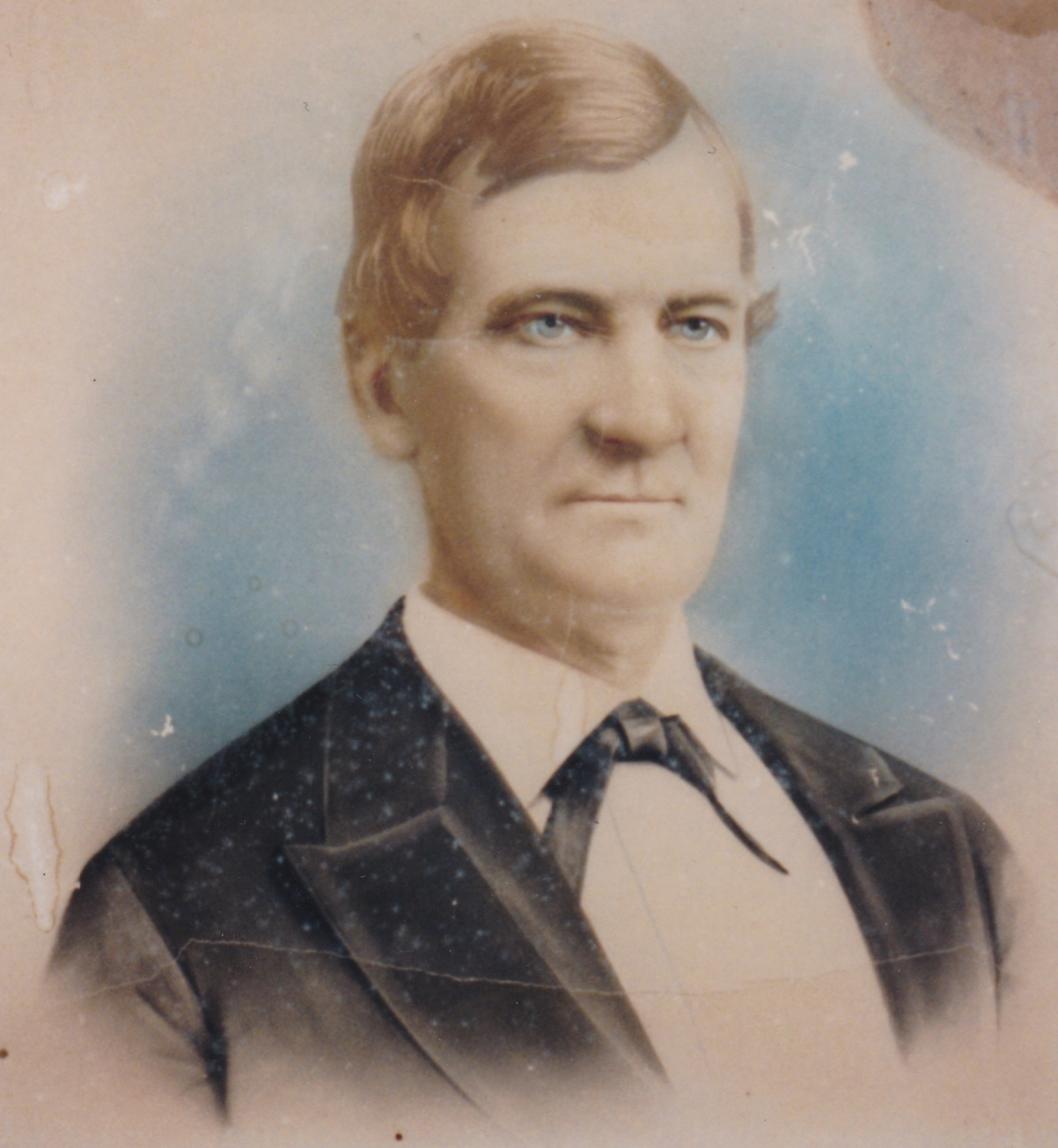
- Portrait of William L. Owen

Member of the Virginia House of Delegates from Halifax County
- In office 1865–1867

Member of the Virginia Constitutional Convention of 1867
- In office December 3, 1867 – April 24, 1868

Member of the Committee of Nine
- In office 1868–1869

Personal details
- Born: April 29, 1809 Black Walnut or Mayo, Halifax County, Virginia U.S.
- Died: July 22, 1881 (aged 72) Cluster Springs, Halifax County, Virginia U.S.
- Spouse: Harriot Amanda Easley
- Children: Mary Ann Owen, Robert Lee Owen, Thomas Easley Owen, Hallie B. Owen, Daniel William Owen, Fannie Craddock Owen, Archibald Alexander Owen, Charlie H. Owen, Helen Owen, John Bailey Owen, Rufus Owen
- Parent(s): John Owen, Nancy Easley Owen
- Occupation: Businessman, Politician

William L. Owen (April 29, 1809 – July 22, 1881) was a planter, businessman, and politician from Halifax County, Virginia. As a politician, he served in the House of Delegates of Virginia, the Committee of Nine, and the Virginia Constitutional Convention of 1867. He was a trustee of Virginia Military Institute and Hampden-Sydney College.

== Early life and education ==
William L. Owen was born April 29, 1809, the second son of John Owen and Nancy Easley of Black Walnut, Virginia, now known as Cluster Springs. Both John and his father Robertson Owen were planters in Halifax County.

Family lore is that he was born in a home named 'Mayo' that takes its name from a community where the Mayo Creek is crossed by modern-day Highway 96 in southeastern Black Walnut District. His brother, Robert Easley Owen, and his nephew, Thomas Howerton Owen, lived in this home the rest of their lives. Census records may verify this.

The Last Will and Testament of his father specified that “my children ... to be given what is generally understood to be a common school education, such as reading, writing and common arithmetic”.

Little else is known of his early life and education.

== Professional life ==
=== Business ===
“He followed his father’s footsteps into business in Granville County, North Carolina, but soon returned to Cluster Springs and built his home ‘Elwood Farm’ which still stands.”

William L. Owen was a director for many years of the Richmond and Danville Railroad.

=== Before the Civil War ===
Family lore tells that as the Civil War approached and began, Owen's extensive business connections in both northern and southern states lead him to believe that the South could not prevail against the industrial strength of the North.

William L. Owen served as a District Commissioner for Halifax County, Virginia according to Acts of the General Assembly of Virginia: Passed in 1852, in the Seventy-sixth Year of the Commonwealth.

=== American Civil War ===
Family lore tells that William L. Owen owned a cotton broker business in Milton, North Carolina and purchased cotton from farmers during the Civil War.

"In a letter to John Bennett dated May 19, 1865, Owen sums up the economic state of himself and Virginia: "I shall lose largely by the war tho' I made no investments in Confederate securities and at no time had any confidence in Confederate money. But the failure of the Confederacy carries with it all of our Banks and probably most of the State and County securities..."".

=== Virginia House of Delegates ===
William L. Owen "was a part of the major actions of the government and citizens to bring Virginia back into the Union, an effort which found him alongside, and sometimes caught between, many erstwhile advocates of the New South and Southern traditionalists."

William L. Owen was a member of the House of Delegates of Virginia from 1865 to 1867, serving on the following committees:

- Second Auditor's Office (1865–1866) (chair)
- Executive Expenditures (1866–1867)
- Finance Resolutions (1866–1867)

According to oral history, one of his former slaves served in the House of Delegates of Virginia at the same time as he. While the Dr. Martin Luther King Jr. Memorial Commission of the Virginia General Assembly identifies eight African-Americans who served Halifax County in the House and Constitutional Convention, one, Alexander Owen, shares the family name:

“Alexander Owen, a slave, was a rock mason who was born in 1830 or 1831 to Patrick and Lucy Hughes Owen. Mr. Owen represented Halifax County in the Virginia House of Delegates from 1869 to 1871.”

Mr. Owen did serve with David Canada, an African-American, in the Constitutional Convention of 1867

Further research is needed to determine if either of these two individuals were former slaves of Owen.

=== Virginia Convention ===
William L. Owen served in the Virginia Constitutional Convention of 1867.

"Owen voted as a Conservative throughout the convention with only one exception: he voted with the Radicals against a "roll call on the adoption of a minority report of the Committee on the Franchise ... [which failed to enfranchise Blacks.". According to the minutes of the debate, he disagreed with some proposed provisions, especially funding sources in the form of taxes from exempt businesses. The convention was factious, and members argued extensively over issues the Federal Government required them to address in the Reconstruction Constitution. Owen felt the pressure acutely and wrote in April 1868 to a family member: "How a wise and rational government could have contrived - and can continue [these policies]... is to me the greatest wonder and astonishment of my life. I have been through all the trials until now intensely National in my feelings. At great peril to my reputation amongst my own people and kindred...and fully I plead for the Union and upheld its authority. Is it human nature to continue to live and cherish a Government so cruel?""

He authored the Address of the conservative members of the late state convention, to the people of Virginia available at HathiTrust Digital Library.

His participation in the Constitutional Convention and Committee of Nine is recorded in The Debates and proceedings of the Constitutional convention of the state of Virginia available at HathiTrust Digital Library and recounted in The Constitution of Virginia: An Annotated Edition.

=== Committee of Nine ===
During the Reconstruction, he played a major role in the Committee of Nine.

=== Trustee ===
He was a member of the Board of Visitors of Virginia Military Institute from 1864 to 1871. Later in life, he was referred to as “Colonel”, but this must have been an honorary title since he did not attend VMI and does not appear to have been in the military.

He was elected to the Board of Trustees of Hampden-Sydney College June 13, 1876 and served until his death in 1881. At least two of his sons attended Hampden-Sydney College and one son, Archibald Alexander Owen, married a daughter of Hampden-Sydney College President John M. P. Atkinson.

== Marriage and children ==
On September 3, 1842, he married Harriet Amanda Easley, daughter of Thomas Easly and Harriet C. Bailey Easley, and they began married life by moving into ‘Elwood’ in Cluster Springs. They had eleven children:

- Mary Ann Owen (September 11, 1843 – August 17, 1927)
- Robert Lee Owen (February 6, 1846 – December 7, 1871)
- Thomas Easley Owen (January 1, 1848 – June 10, 1865) Died at 17 as a Federal prisoner of war at Pt. Lookout, Maryland.
- Hallie B. Owen (June 12, 1849 – January 10, 1931)
- Daniel William Owen (June 24, 1852 – September 27, 1937) Served in the House of Delegates of Virginia 1914 to 1923 for County of Halifax
- Fannie Craddock Owen (July 11, 1853 – December 20, 1940)
- Archibald Alexander Owen (April 3, 1856 – April 6, 1926)
- Charlie H. Owen (October 25, 1857 – December 13, 1858)
- Helen Owen (April 28, 1860 – June 11, 1937)
- John Bailey Owen (Mar 21, 1863 – November 3, 1950)
- Rufus Owen (October 29, 1867 – November 18, 1931).

In 1857, the Owen family moved into a larger home, ‘Sunnyview’, later destroyed by fire and rebuilt by his son Rufus Owen.

He was a Mason and an Elder in the Presbyterian Church.

== Death and legacy ==
He died July 22, 1881, leaving an estate valued at $999,990. The record of his estate is on file at the Circuit Court Halifax County, Virginia in Book 35, Page 650.

The Owen Memorial in Gwangju, South Korea is named for Owen and his grandson Dr. Clement Carrington Owen, son of Robert Lee Owen. Dr. Owen was a missionary in Korea and died there April 3, 1909. Dr. Georgiana E. Whiting Owen, his wife, organized funding of this building in memorial to William L. Owen and Dr. Clement Owen.

"The Owen Monument and Memorial Hall is located inside the Christian College of Nursing. The monument was erected in 1914 in memory of missionary Clement Owen who, together with Priest Bae Yoo-ji, was the first missionary to come to Jeollanam-do Province. The monument was built using the 4,200 dollars collected by Owen’s relatives in the USA after Owen died as a martyr in Gwangju.

A Western-style building with a total surface area of 434 square meters (including the annex building), the monument is said to have been used as chapel and assembly room. Today, the building serves as the auditorium of the Christian College of Nursing.

Clement Owen came to Yangnim-dong, Gwangju in the 1900s and served as a missionary and medical volunteer with his wife, who was a nurse, before dying of exhaustion and overwork in 1909. Owen had hoped to build a memorial hospital in honor of his grandfather, but died before his plan was materialized. The plaque hanging in the hall honors both men in English and Chinese reading, “In Memory of William L. and Clement C. Owen.""

The Hon. W.L. Owen Scholarship at Hampden-Sydney College was dedicated in his honor in 2009 to commemorate the 200th anniversary of his birth.

== See also ==
- Committee of Nine
