= Virginia Constitutional Convention of 1864 =

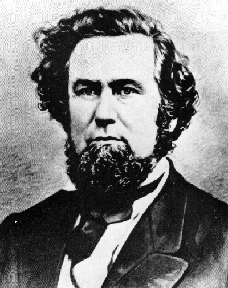
Francis Pierpont, Loyalist Governor called 1864 Convention

The Virginia Convention of 1864 was an assembly of sixteen loyal Unionists during the American Civil War meeting under the auspices of Virginia's Restored Government. It abolished slavery in the state of Virginia, and framed the fundamental civil law that served Virginia government for six years through Appomattox, Presidential Reconstruction and Congressional Reconstruction.

== Background and composition ==
Following the creation of West Virginia, the remnant of Restored Virginian government held a Convention of delegates from a few periphery counties occupied by Union forces. The Convention sought direction from President Lincoln whether the General Government would sustain the civil authority, or "whether the civil is to become, as it is now, subordinate to the military", so that the convened delegates could support the Administration's war effort in the midst of Grant's Wilderness Campaign.

== Meeting and debate ==
The Convention met in Alexandria's U.S. District Court Room from February 13 - April 11, 1864, and elected LeRoy G. Edwards, a slaveholder with three sons in the Confederacy as its presiding officer. Debate ensued over whether to seek to disenfranchise all supporters of the rebellion, but with an eye to governing after cessation of hostilities, it limited disenfranchisement only to those who had held office in rebel state or Confederate governments.

A fifty-two-page journal of convention proceedings was published, but the debates were not formally recorded. W. J. Cowing, secretary of the convention and editor of the pro-Union Alexandria, Virginia State Journal, featured accounts of some debate, but only one edition remains covering the convention.

== Outcomes ==
After debating whether abolition of slavery would best proceed gradually or at once, with compensation to loyal Union men or without, the Convention resolved to abolish slavery immediately without compensation on April 10, 1864. It abolished the viva voce voting out loud and called for balloting for state officials. Immediately on its proclamation, the Constitution of 1864 was enforceable only in areas under Union control, but it would serve as Virginia's fundamental law until the Constitution of 1870 went into force.

== Chart of delegates ==
The delegates to the Virginia Convention of 1864 were elected January 21, 1864. (Seventeen members, from territory inside Union lines meeting February 13 during the Civil War's Wilderness Campaign in Virginia)

Region	Name	County, other elective office
Northern Virginia		
	John Henshaw	Loudoun
	James M. Downey	Loudoun
	E. R. Gover	Loudoun
	John Hawxhurst	Fairfax, also 1868 Convention
	S. Ferguson Beach	Alexandria and Fairfax
	Walter L. Penn	Alexandria County
Eastern Shore		
	William H. Dix	Accomac
	Arthur Watson	Accomac and Northampton H. 55/56, 59/60, /61
	William P. Moore	Northampton
Lower Peninsula		
	Robert B. Wood	Elizabeth City
	T. S. Tennis	Elizabeth City, York, Warwick, Charles City, New Kent, James City, Williamburg
Southeast		
	John W. Stone	Princess Anne H. 46/47, 47/48
	George R. Boush	Norfolk County
	Philip G. Thomas	Norfolk County H. /74, 74/75,
	Warren W. Wing	Norfolk Senatorial District
	Leroy G. Edwards	Princess Anne, Norfolk County, Portsmouth
	Lewis W. Webb	Norfolk City H. 81/82

== See also ==
- Virginia Conventions

== Bibliography ==
- Alexandria Gazette, vol. 65, No.68 and 71, 21 and 24 March 1864 @ Virginia Chronicle, Library of Virginia and "Virginia Convention of 1864" online at encyclopediavirginia.org
- "Virginia Convention of 1864", Library of Virginia online at encyclopediavirginia.org
- Bearss, Sara B. (2014). "Restored and Vindicated: The Virginia Constitutional Convention of 1864". The Virginia Magazine of History and Biography. 122 (2): 156–181. JSTOR 24393924.
- Brenaman, Jacob Neff (1902). A History of Virginia Conventions. J.L. Hill Printing Company, Richmond. ISBN 978-1-2982-7850-0.
- Swem, Earl Greg (1918). A Register of the General Assembly of Virginia, 1776-1918, and of the Constitutional Conventions. David Bottom, Superintendent of Public Printing. ISBN 978-1-3714-6242-0.
