= Woodlawn Cemetery (Fairmont, West Virginia) =

- U.S. National Register of Historic Places
- U.S. Historic district
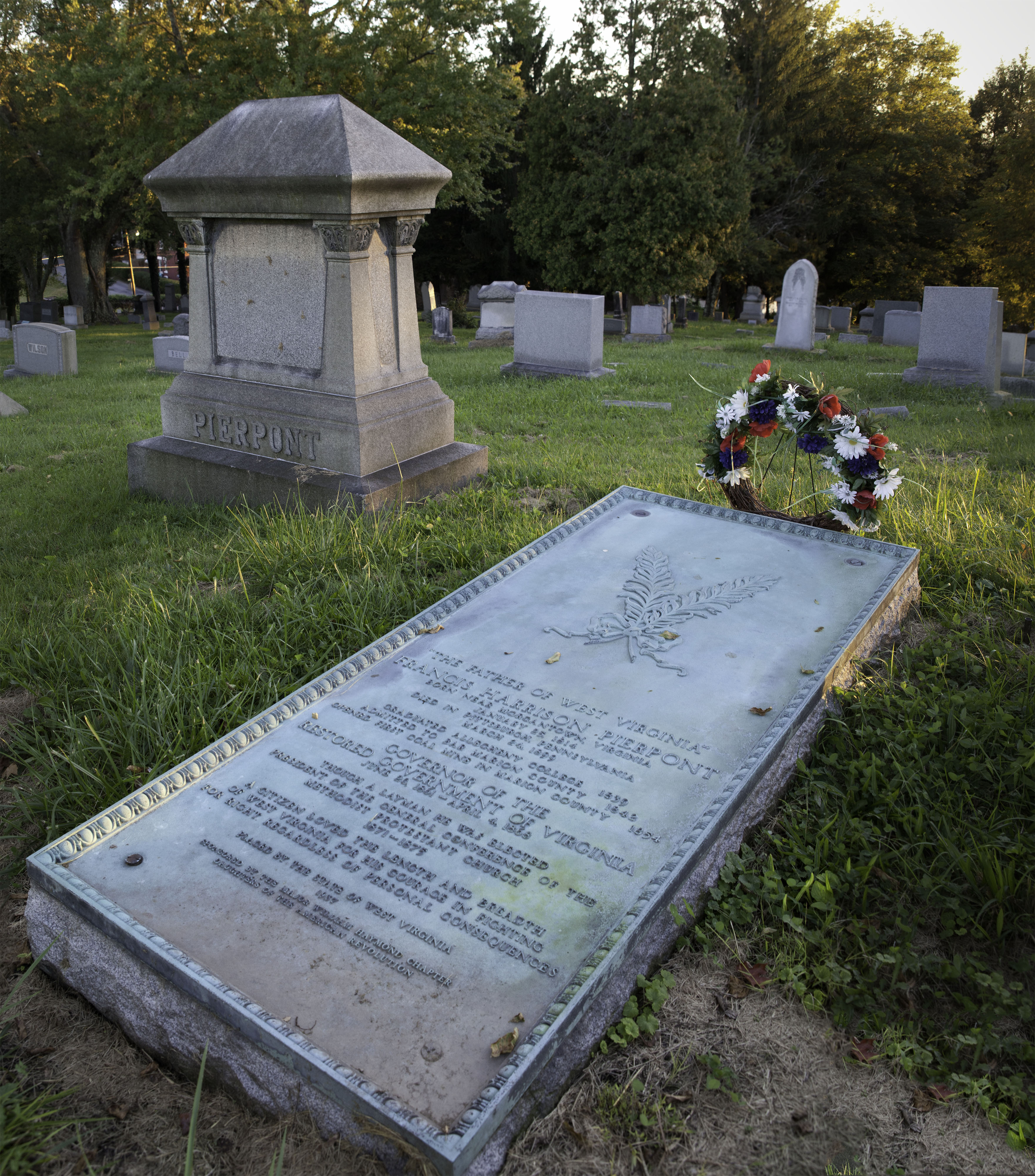

- Location within West Virginia Location within the United States
- Location: 335 Maple Ave., Fairmont, West Virginia
- Coordinates: 39°29′37″N 80°8′14″W
- Area: 43 acres (17 ha)
- Built: 1875
- Architect: Nicolet, Tell William
- Architectural style: Exotic Revival, rural cemetery movement
- NRHP reference No.: 04000305
- Added to NRHP: April 14, 2004

Woodlawn Cemetery, located in Fairmont, West Virginia, United States, is an example of the rural cemetery. It was laid out by Tell W. Nicolet of the firm of Morris and Knowles of Pittsburgh, PA. It is listed on the National Register of Historic Places as a historic district. Today, the cemetery covers 42 acres (170,000 m^{2}) and has over 15,000 burials.

== History ==
The cemetery was established in the early spring of 1875. Joseph R. Hamilton was climbing the fence between his father's farm and that of Norval Barns. The loaded rifle he was carrying accidentally discharged, killing him. His father's decision to "bury him where he lay" led to the families establishing a small burying ground. They opened the fence line between their properties and enclosed about a quarter of an acre to use for family burials.

Ten years later, in December 1885, the Woodlawn Cemetery Company was incorporated and plots were offered for sale to the larger community. 5 acres (20,000 m^{2}) were purchased from each of the land owners, Elmus Hamilton and Norval Barns. Many of the early leaders of the Fairmont community were laid to rest here. Among them is Francis Harrison Pierpont, the Governor of the Restored State of Virginia from 1861 to 1868, his wife Julia and three of their four children.

== Notable burials ==
Boaz Fleming, the founder of Fairmont, is here with his wife, Elizabeth. Other members of his family are here as well, including Clarissa Fleming Hamilton, his grandson Elmus Hamilton, owner of the Hamilton farm, and great-grandson, Joseph R. Hamilton. Another descendant is Aretas B. Fleming, eighth governor of West Virginia. A lawyer, Aretas Fleming was among the men who created the Fairmont Development Company and worked to develop Fairmont, West Virginia.

James Otis Watson is considered the father of the bituminous coal industry in north central West Virginia. He and Pierpont owned the first coal mine to be commercially viable following the completion of the Baltimore and Ohio Railroad linking Fairmont with the eastern seaboard markets. One of his daughters, Carrie Watson Fleming, married Aretas B. Fleming. His sons, James Edwin Watson, Sylvanus Lamb Watson and Clarence Wayland Watson are also buried here.

Matthew Mansfield Neely was a governor, a Congressman and U.S. Senator.

Other notable burials include:

- Alpheus F. Haymond, judge and member of the West Virginia Supreme Court of Appeals
- Sam Jones, Major League Baseball pitcher
- Benjamin F. Martin, member of the U.S. House of Representatives
- Charles W. Swisher, thirteenth Secretary of State of West Virginia
- Clarence Wayland Watson, coal baron, World War One officer and member of the United States Senate.

== See also ==
- National Register of Historic Places listings in Marion County, West Virginia
