= Tree Hill (Richmond, Virginia) =

Historic house in Virginia, United States

- U.S. National Register of Historic Places
- Virginia Landmarks Register
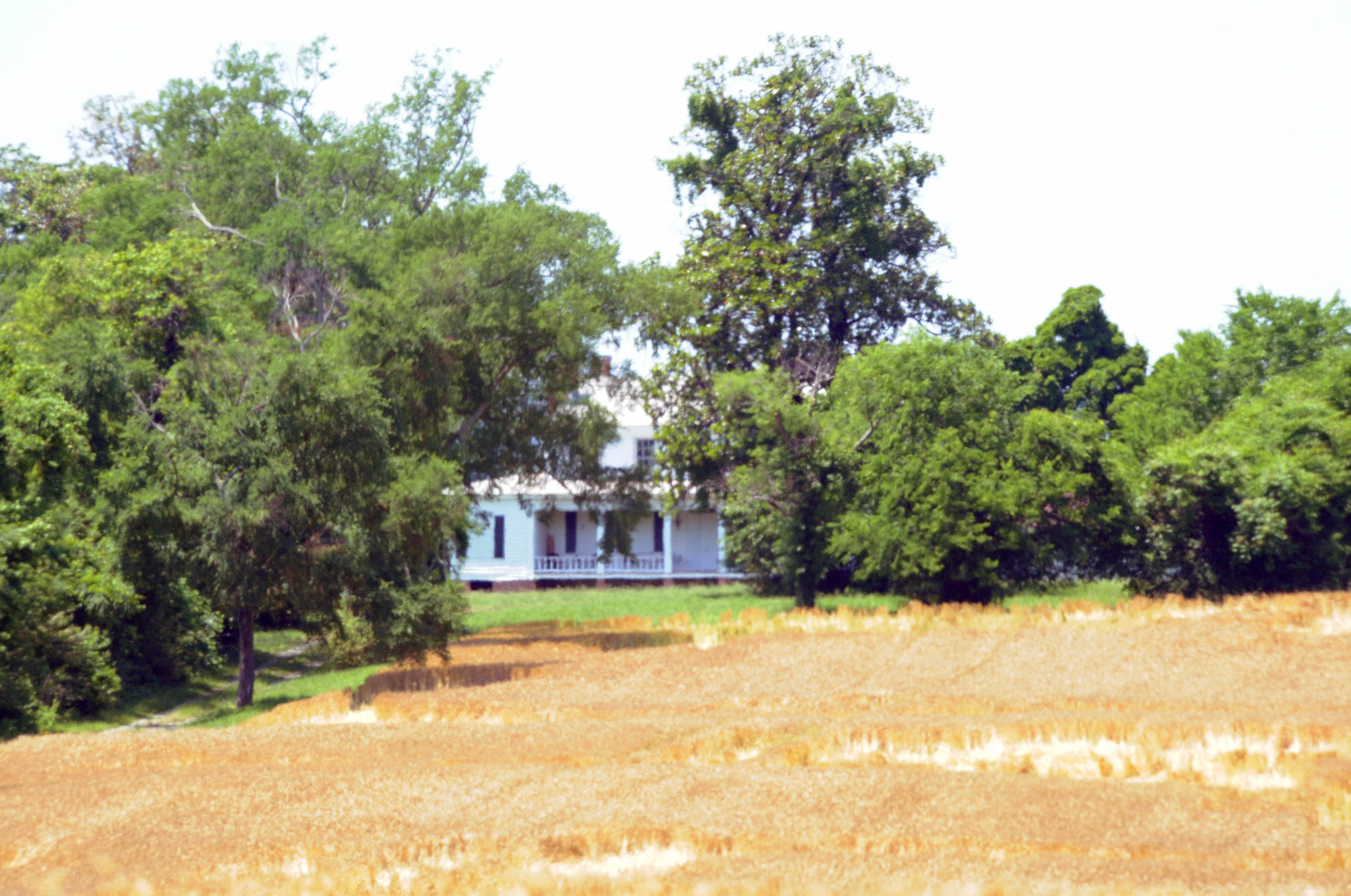

- Location within Virginia Location within the United States
- Location: VA 5, near Richmond, Virginia
- Coordinates: 37°29′46″N 77°24′49″W
- Area: 531 acres (215 ha)
- Architectural style: Greek Revival
- NRHP reference No.: 74002127
- VLR No.: 043-0032

Significant dates
- Added to NRHP: October 17, 1974
- Designated VLR: May 21, 1974

Tree Hill near Richmond, Virginia, in Henrico County, Virginia, is a Greek Revival style plantation house overlooking the James River about two miles east of downtown Richmond near the intersection of the historic Osborne Turnpike and New Market Road. Currently still a private farm, but expected to become partly a park after housing and commercial development, it was once owned by Richmond distiller and landowner Franklin Stearns, a prominent Unionist during the American Civil War. Centuries earlier, it had been a Native American camp site, and the birthplace of powerful chief Powhatan (d.1618).

On the night of April 3, 1865, as Richmond burned due to fires set by evacuating Confederate forces, Richmond mayor Joseph C. Mayo traveled in a horse-drawn buggy along Main Street (which becomes the Osborne Turnpike) alongside the James River about a mile past Rockett's Landing, where he came upon Union cavalry encamped at Tree Hill (near the intersection with New Market Road toward Williamsburg). He delivered a note surrendering the city and requesting help restoring order and protecting people and property.

== History ==
Tree Hill Farm has been occupied for more than two centuries, during the colonial era by the Chickahominy tribe of Native Americans. In 1778, Henrico County clerk (and future delegate in the Virginia General Assembly) Miles Selden of the Selden family purchased the property and by 1785 constructed a horse racing track, one of the first such in America. During his 1824 farewell tour of the former colonies he helped liberate, the Marquis de Lafayette visited the racecourse. His daughter Patsy and her husband William Roane inherited Tree Hill plantation in 1837.

In 1855, Franklin Stearns bought the plantation from the Roanes. Although a Unionist (and imprisoned as well as placed in house arrest various times during the American Civil War), Stearns allowed cattle belonging to the Confederate's Chimborazo Hospital to graze on the property, for which the Confederate government paid him. Union troops occupied the house in April 1865.

On the property's east side stood the Surrender Tree, a massive oak that reputedly marked the spot where Mayor Joseph C. Mayo surrendered the city of Richmond to Union forces on the night of April 2–3, 1865 by giving two Union majors a note telling the Union commander that the Confederates had evacuated and begging him to preserve order, as well as protect Women, children and property. The Union officers conveyed the document to General Godfrey Weitzel, who ordered troops to extinguish the flames, as well as traveled downtown to city hall to accept a formal document at 8:15 a.m.

The Burlee family bought the farm from Stearns' grandchildren in 1910, and successive generations kept it as a farm until recently. Tree Hill was listed on the National Register of Historic Places in 1974. The listing included three contributing buildings.

In 2026, a coalition of Virginia tribal nations was formed to ask for consultation on the Canadian developer Brookfield Residential's plan to purchase the site and build 2000 housing units on it. The property was added to Preservation Virginia's list of most endangered historical places in May 2026.

== Current status ==
A historical marker has commemorated the site since 2002, and in 2015 re-enactors and others marked the 150th anniversary of Richmond's surrender there. In 2014, Meg Ryan and Tom Hanks filmed Ithaca at the property. The oak fell during a severe thunderstorm in the summer of 2012. The property is now owned by Gray Land and Development Company, which secured permission to develop the site with as many as 2,770 homes and 1.1 million square feet of office space, conditioned upon restoration of the manor house and barn, as well as set-asides for a school, library and place to honor the area's Native American heritage.
