= 1869 Virginia gubernatorial election =

- July 6, 1869
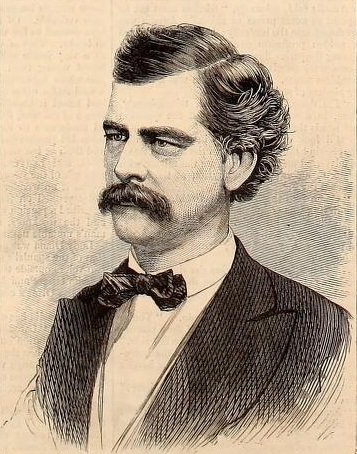

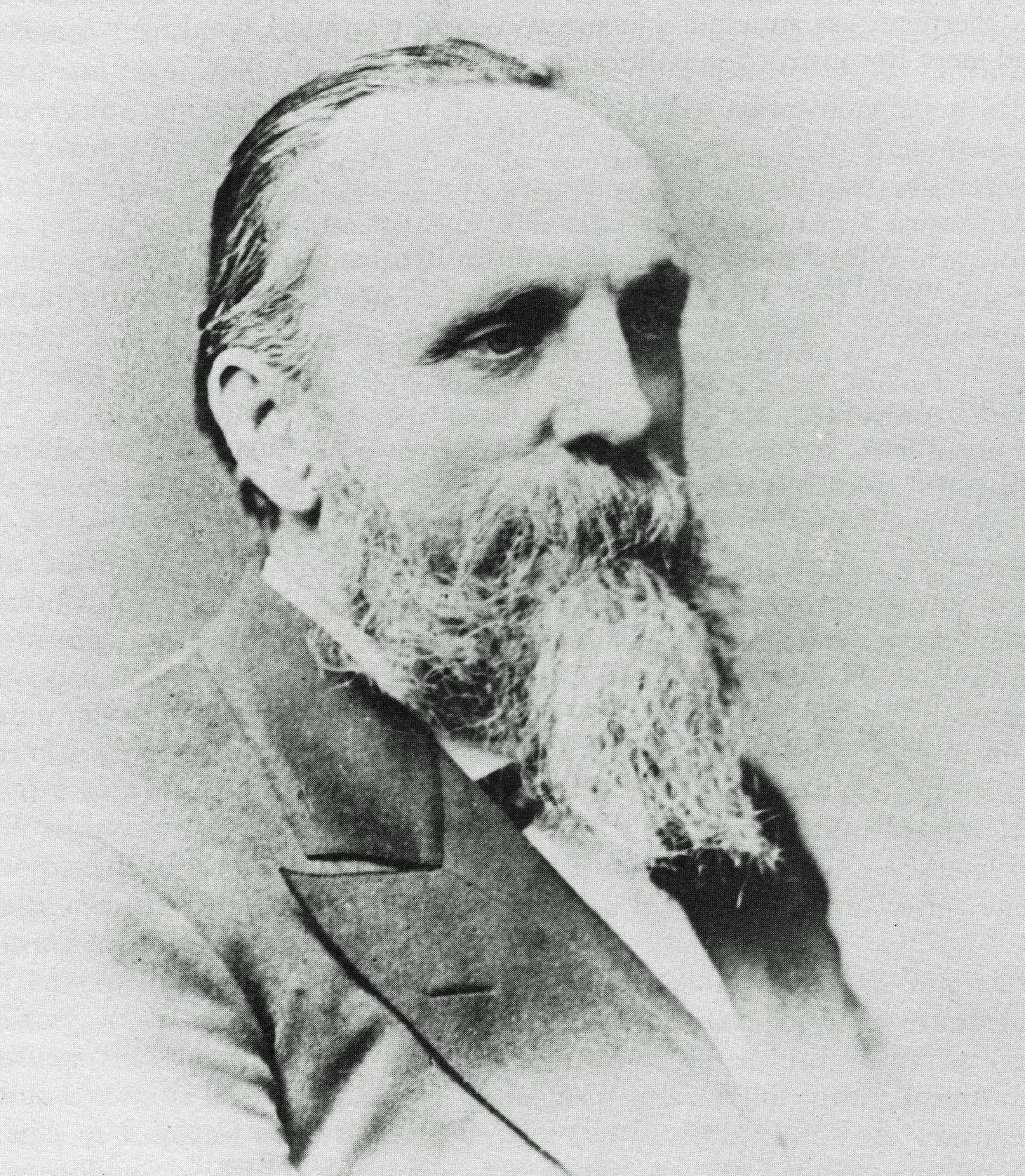
Nominee	Gilbert Carlton Walker	Henry H. Wells
Party	Conservative Republican	Radical Republican
Popular vote	119,502	101,184
Percentage	54.15%	45.85%
- County results Walker: 50–60% 60–70% 70–80% 80–90% >90% Wells: 50–60% 60–70% 70–80% 80–90%
Governor before election
Henry H. Wells
Radical Republican
Elected Governor
Gilbert C. Walker
Conservative Republican

A gubernatorial election was held in Virginia on July 6, 1869. The Conservative Republican candidate Gilbert C. Walker defeated the Radical Republican candidate Henry H. Wells.

The election took place during the Reconstruction era following the American Civil War. Concurrent elections for the Virginia General Assembly resulted in 21 African Americans elected to the Virginia House of Delegates and six to the Virginia Senate. Some candidates were so-called "carpetbaggers," Union Army officers politicians from the Northern United States who relocated to the former Confederacy following the end of the war. Thomas Bayne was a party leader among the African-American group, although he lost the election when a White Republican ran against him in the same election, splitting the vote and allowing a Democrat to win.

== Gubernatorial election results ==
Virginia gubernatorial election, 1869
Party	Candidate	Votes	%
Conservative Republican	Gilbert Carlton Walker	119,502	54.15%
Radical Republican	Henry H. Wells (incumbent)	101,184	45.85%
Total votes		220,686	100.00%
Conservative Republican gain from Radical Republican			
