= Stearns Iron-Front Building =

Historic commercial building in Virginia, United States

- U.S. National Register of Historic Places
- Virginia Landmarks Register
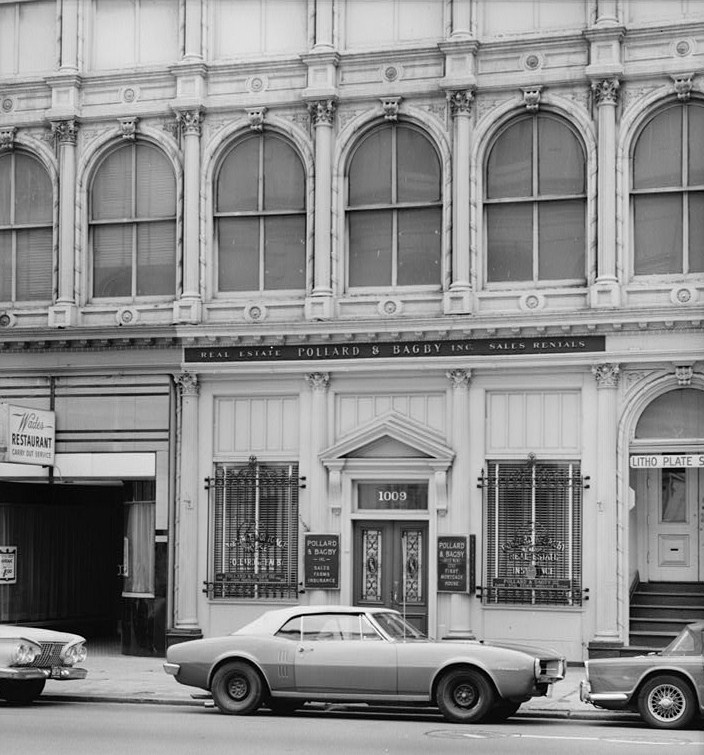
- Stearns Iron-Front Building, HABS Photo

- Location within Virginia Location within the United States
- Location: 1007-1013 E. Main St., Richmond, Virginia
- Coordinates: 37°32′14″N 77°26′8″W
- Area: 0.3 acres (0.12 ha)
- Built: 1869
- NRHP reference No.: 70000885
- VLR No.: 127-0023

Significant dates
- Added to NRHP: February 26, 1970
- Designated VLR: December 2, 1969

Stearns Iron-Front Building, also known as the Stearns Block, is a historic commercial building located in Richmond, Virginia. It was built in 1869, and is a four-story, 14 bay, brick building with a cast iron front. The building measures 107 feet (33 m) wide by 64 feet (20 m) deep.

Richmond Unionist Franklin Stearns acquired what had once been the Planters Bank Building on Main Street after the American Civil War. In 1868 he erected rental housing and commercial office space, which was nicknamed the "Stearns block." The city's circuit court was held there beginning in 1870. His grandchildren's estate sold the property in 1923; the remaining iron front was noted in the Historic American Buildings Survey.

It was listed on the National Register of Historic Places in 1970.
