= Gilbert C. Walker =

American politician (1833–1885)

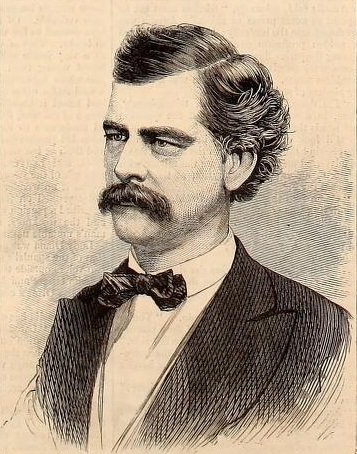
- Harper's Weekly, July 24, 1869

Member of the U.S. House of Representatives from Virginia's 3rd district
- In office March 4, 1875 – March 3, 1879
- Preceded by: John A. Smith
- Succeeded by: Joseph E. Johnston

Chairman of the House Committee on Education and Labor
- In office March 4, 1875 – March 3, 1877
- Preceded by: James Monroe
- Succeeded by: John Goode, Jr.

36th Governor of Virginia
- In office September 21, 1869 – January 1, 1874; Provisional Governor from September 21, 1869 – January 1, 1870
- Lieutenant: John F. Lewis; John Lawrence Marye Jr.
- Preceded by: Henry H. Wells (as Provisional Governor)
- Succeeded by: James L. Kemper

Personal details
- Born: Gilbert Carlton Walker; August 1, 1833 Binghamton, New York, US
- Died: May 11, 1885 (aged 51) New York City, US
- Resting place: Spring Forest Cemetery, Binghamton, New York, US
- Party: Republican (before 1870)
- Other political affiliations: Democratic (after 1870)
- Spouse: Olive E. Evans (m. 1857)
- Education: Hamilton College
- Profession: Attorney

Gilbert Carlton Walker (August 1, 1833 – May 11, 1885) was an American politician. He served as the 36th Governor of Virginia, first as a Republican provisional governor between 1869 and 1870, and again as a Democrat elected governor from 1870 to 1874. He was the last Republican governor of Virginia until Linwood Holton took office in 1970.

== Early and family life ==
Walker was born in Binghamton, New York on August 1, 1833, the son of Sabinus Walker and Matilda (Galloway) Walker. (Note: Several editions of the Congressional Biographical Directory indicate Walker was born in South Gibson, Pennsylvania. Primary source documents including U.S. and state census entries and U.S. passport applications indicate that Walker was born in New York state. The 1855 New York State Census indicates he was born in Broome County, New York, which includes Binghamton. Most secondary sources indicate that he was born in Binghamton. One indicates he was born in Cuba, New York. These details indicate a definite birth in New York state, with the most likely locale being Binghamton.) Walker's parents separated when he was young, and his mother married Donald Grant of Chenango, New York. He attended academies in Delaware, New York and Binghamton, New York, then attended Williams College in Williamstown, Massachusetts from 1851 to 1852.

In 1854, Walker received a Bachelor of Arts degree from Hamilton College in Clinton, New York. While in college, he became a member of the Sigma Phi fraternity, and he won the college's first prize for declamation during his junior year. He studied law with Judge Horace S. Griswold of Binghamton and was admitted to the bar in 1855. In 1857 he received his Master of Arts degree from Hamilton.

== Legal and business career ==
Walker practiced in Owego, New York, from 1855 to 1859, and in Chicago from 1859 to 1864. He moved to Norfolk, Virginia, in 1864 and practiced law. Walker also became involved in finance and served as president of Norfolk's Exchange National Bank. His other business ventures included serving on the board of directors of the American Fire Insurance Company of Norfolk. In 1866, he was an original incorporator of the Norfolk Insurance and Trust Company. Walker was also a director of the Atlantic Iron Works and Dock Company and served as its president from 1866 to 1869. Walker was president of Richmond, Virginia's Granite Insurance Company from 1874 to 1878 and editor and publisher of the Richmond Enquirer from 1874 to 1875.

== Political career ==
Walker served as Governor of Virginia from 1869 to 1874. He also served as a Democrat in the Forty-fourth and Forty-fifth Congresses (March 4, 1875 – March 3, 1879). In the Forty-fourth Congress, he was chair of the Committee on Education and Labor. He did not stand for reelection in 1878.

== Later years ==
Walker resettled in Binghamton, New York, in 1879 and resumed his legal practice. He moved to New York City in 1881, where he continued practicing law. Walker remained active in business ventures, including serving as president of the New York Underground Railroad Company.

== Death and burial ==
Walker died in New York City on May 11, 1885. He was buried at Spring Forest Cemetery in Binghamton.

== Family ==
In 1857, Walker married Olive E. Evans of Binghamton.

== Electoral history ==
- 1869; Walker was elected Governor of Virginia with 54.15% of the vote, defeating fellow Republican Henry H. Wells.
- 1874; Walker was elected to the U.S. House of Representatives with 55.33% of the vote, defeating Republican Rush Bargess and Independent R.A. Paul.
- 1876; Walker was re-elected with 53.64% of the vote, defeating Republican Charles S. Mills.

== Notes ==
Party political offices
Vacant Title last held by John Letcher	Democratic nominee for Governor of Virginia; 1869	Succeeded by James L. Kemper
Political offices
Preceded by Henry H. Wells; Acting	Governor of Virginia; 1869–1874	Succeeded by James L. Kemper
Preceded by James Monroe; Ohio	Chairman of House Education and Labor Committee; 1875–1877	Succeeded by John Goode Jr. Virginia
U.S. House of Representatives
Preceded by John A. Smith	Member of the U.S. House of Representatives from Virginia's 3rd congressional district 1875–1879	Succeeded by Joseph E. Johnston
