= Francis Harrison Pierpont =

American politician

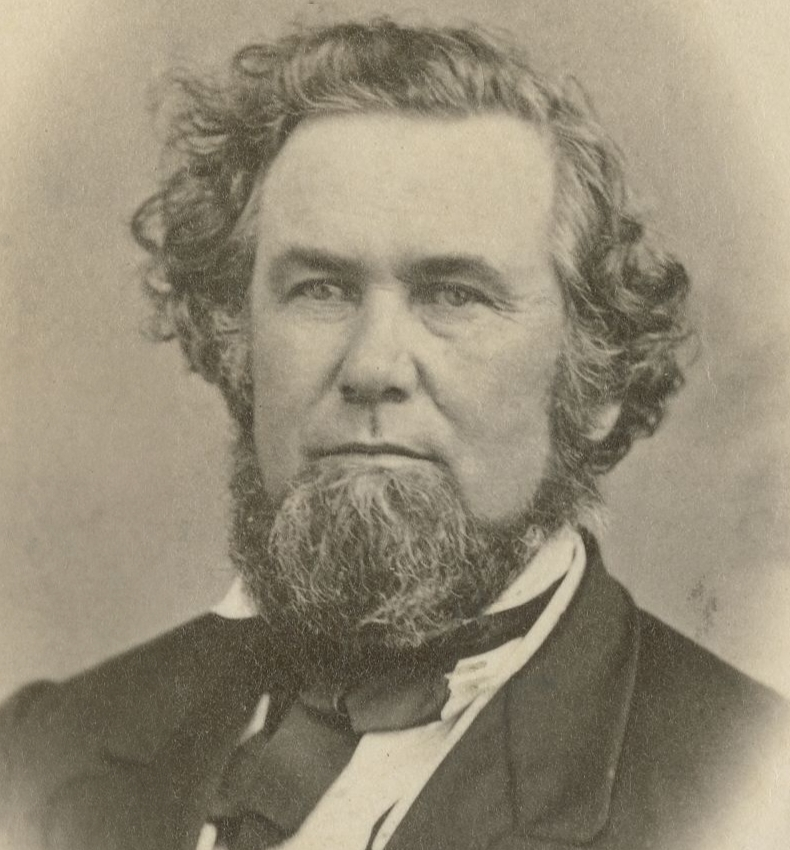
- Pierpont, c. 1864-1865

Governor of the Restored Government of Virginia
- In office May 15, 1861 – June 20, 1863
- Lieutenant Governor: Daniel Polsley (1861–1863); Leopold C. P. Cowper (1863–1868)
- Preceded by: John Letcher (C.S.)
- Succeeded by: Arthur I. Boreman

Governor of Virginia (Disputed until May 9, 1865)
- In office June 20, 1863 – April 4, 1868
- Preceded by: William Smith (C.S.)
- Succeeded by: Henry H. Wells

Personal details
- Born: January 25, 1814 Morgantown, Virginia, U.S. (now Morgantown, West Virginia, U.S.)
- Died: March 24, 1899 (aged 85) Pittsburgh, Pennsylvania, U.S.
- Party: Republican
- Spouse: Julia Augusta Robertson
- Children: 4
- Occupation: Lawyer

Francis Harrison Pierpont (January 25, 1814 – March 24, 1899), called the "Father of West Virginia," was an American lawyer and politician who achieved prominence during the American Civil War. During the conflict's first two years, Pierpont served as governor of the Restored Government of Virginia and, in this capacity, administered the part of Virginia then under Unionist control (i.e., future West Virginia) before West Virginia's admission to the Union as a separate state. After recognizing the creation of West Virginia, Pierpont continued to serve as governor of the Restored Government. However, the degree of civil authority he could exercise was minimal for the remainder of the war. Having claimed to be the legitimate governor of Virginia for the duration of the conflict, Pierpont assumed civil control of the state's entire post-1863 territory following the dissolution of the Confederacy and continued to serve as governor during the early years of Reconstruction.

In recognition of his significance to its state history, in 1910, West Virginia donated a marble statue of Pierpont as the second of its two contributions to the U.S. Capitol's National Statuary Hall Collection.

== Early life ==
Pierpont was the third son of Catherine Weaver and Francis Peirpoint and was born at the Peirpoint "Plantation" in the "Forks of Cheat" on the Morgantown-Ices Ferry Road, Monongalia County. His middle name, "Harrison," was added later by the boy's father in honor of his commanding officer, General William Henry Harrison.

Pierpont, the original family name, was altered to Peirpoint in the land office at Richmond, Virginia in issuing patents for land deeded to his grandfather, John Pierpont (1742–1796) who grew up in Fairfax County, Virginia and attended the Fairfax Friends Meeting, but left to enlist in the Revolutionary Army, then after it ended moved west to Morgantown in what was then the northwestern corner of the state. Virginia lawyers advised the family that to hold their grandfather's land, they had to spell their last name as recorded in the patent. Thus Francis used the name "Peirpoint" throughout his life. He also utilized "Pierpont" throughout most of his adult life, including during his terms as the Civil War and Reconstruction Governor of Virginia. In 1880, when President Garfield appointed him Collector of Internal Revenue, Peirpoint sent his name to the U.S. Senate as Francis H. Pierpont. Pierpont writes that "He consented to the change of his name because it was right."

While Frank was a boy, his family moved their leatherworking business to what is today Marion County, West Virginia. He was a great-grandson of Morgantown's founder Zackquill Morgan. Frank Pierpont was educated in a one-room schoolhouse and by his own reading. Pierpont became linked with the region's history for the rest of his life. After walking to Pennsylvania, he enrolled in and graduated from Allegheny College. Later, he taught school in Harrison County. Then he traveled and became an abolitionist after seeing slavery's abuses in Mississippi.

He returned home to Fairmont, handled the family's tanning business, became active in the Methodist Church, and began studying law. He was admitted to the bar in 1841. In 1848, Pierpont became the local attorney for the Baltimore and Ohio Railroad. Before entering politics, he also helped found Fairmont Male and Female Seminary, the forerunner to Fairmont State University.

== Political career ==
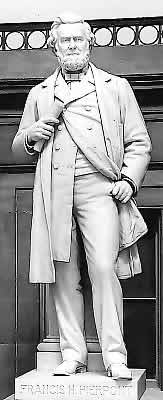
Francis Harrison Pierpont, NSHC statue

=== Civil War ===
An active supporter of Abraham Lincoln, Pierpont became more involved in politics as an outspoken opponent of Virginia's secession from the Union. When Virginia seceded and entered the war, delegates from the northwestern counties of Virginia, which refused to join the Confederacy, met at the Wheeling Convention. Declaring that their elected officials had abandoned their posts, a rump government was established in Wheeling, with Pierpont as the provisional Governor. Claiming to be the legitimate government of the entire Commonwealth of Virginia, the "Restored Government" drafted a new Virginia Constitution and sent representatives to the Union Congress. The Second Wheeling Convention met on June 11, 1861. On June 20, 1861, it unanimously elected Pierpont governor of the Restored Government of Virginia, with the recognition of President Lincoln. In 1862, Pierpont attended the Loyal War Governors' Conference in Altoona, Pennsylvania, organized by Pennsylvania governor Andrew Gregg Curtin, which ultimately backed Abraham Lincoln's Emancipation Proclamation and the Union war effort. Pierpont was again elected governor for a four-year term by the legislature on May 28, 1863.

Under Pierpont's leadership, the Wheeling government called for a popular vote on creating a new separate state. Despite a lack of overwhelming support and widespread fraud in the voting process, the Restored Government pressed the U.S. Congress for statehood, which also approved the issue. The new state took the name West Virginia and was admitted into the Union in 1863. A lifelong West Virginian, Pierpont had hoped to become the new state's first governor. However, the Lincoln administration was keen to ensure that the continuity of the Restored Government was not disrupted and made clear it would not countenance Pierpont leaving his post unless a suitable successor could be found, who, for political reasons, would have had to be a man with roots in the Commonwealth's post-1863 borders who was loyal to the United States, willing to recognize West Virginia, qualified to serve as a state governor and yet also willing to accept an office that it appeared would be little more than a figurehead position for an indeterminate period.

As no viable candidate willing to succeed Pierpont could be found, Arthur I. Boreman was elected governor of West Virginia. At the same time, Pierpont reluctantly remained Governor of the "restored" state of Virginia. From 1863 until 1865, the Pierpont administration's de facto control was limited to those parts of the Commonwealth not claimed by West Virginia that were held by Federal arms - specifically, several Northern Virginia, Norfolk area, and Eastern Shore counties. While Pierpont claimed Richmond as the official state capital (as his administration had done since 1861), the de facto seat of government was established in Alexandria for the remainder of the Civil War. The pro-Confederate state government in Richmond maintained its claim to the Commonwealth's antebellum borders and administered the regions of the Commonwealth still held under Confederate arms - at the time of West Virginia's statehood, this included at least some measure of control about thirteen counties claimed by the newly admitted state. In 1864 Pierpont called a Constitutional Convention in Alexandria that recognized West Virginia, abolished slavery, and promulgated the civil Constitution in force in Virginia until 1869.

On May 9, 1865, one month after the surrender of the Army of Northern Virginia, President Andrew Johnson recognized Pierpont as the governor of Virginia. Pierpont immediately re-located the seat of government to Richmond.

=== Reconstruction ===
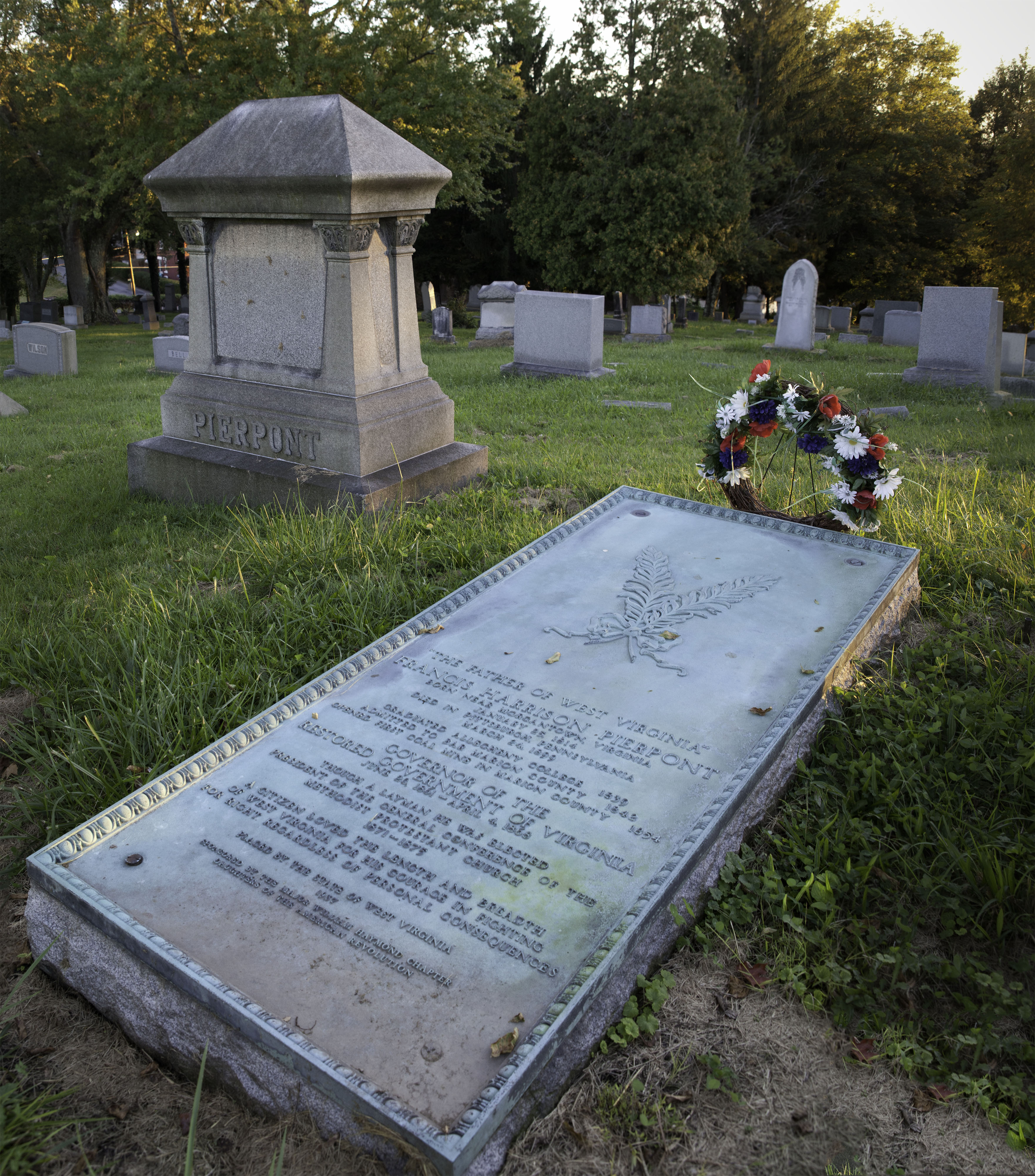
Grave

Pierpont followed a policy of forgiveness to those politicians who had served in the Confederate military and government. The Virginia government started to pass laws restoring ex-Confederates to their lost privileges, to the displeasure of most former Union Republicans. As the South became increasingly resistant to Reconstruction after the war, the United States Congress passed the Military Reconstruction Act of 1867. Through this Act, Virginia was designated the "First Military District" in 1868, and military commander John Schofield replaced Pierpont with Henry H. Wells until state delegates could write and enact a new constitution. According to the Civil War historian Richard Lowe, Hiram Bond, a former Vanderbilt family functionary and friend of Grant, planned the removal of Pierpont and installation of Welles. Pierpont became one of the key figures in the Virginia constitutional convention of 1867–1868, which resulted in the Underwood Constitution of 1869. After this, Pierpont left Virginia politics and returned to his law practice in West Virginia.

Pierpont subsequently was elected to one term in the West Virginia House of Delegates in 1870 but lost his seat when the Democrats took control of the state. His last public office was as a collector of Internal Revenue under President James Garfield. After his retirement, he helped create the West Virginia Historical Society, as well as served as President of the Methodist Protestant Church.

== Death and legacy ==
He died at his daughter's home in Pittsburgh, Pennsylvania on March 24, 1899. Three years later, his remains were relocated to Woodlawn Cemetery in Fairmont, West Virginia. They reside next to those of his wife Julia and three of their four children.

A monument to Francis Pierpont was installed in Wheeling on West Virginia Day in 2015.

== See also ==
- Charles Henry Ambler – Premier Pierpont biographer and preeminent historian of West Virginia

Party political offices
First	Republican nominee for Governor of Virginia; 1863	Succeeded by Henry H. Wells
Political offices
Preceded by John Letcher as the undisputed Governor	Unionist Governor of Virginia; 1861–1865	Succeeded by Himself; Undisputed Governor
Preceded by William Smith; Confederate Governor	Undisputed Governor of Virginia; 1865–1868	Succeeded by Henry H. Wells; Provisional Governor
Preceded by Himself; Unionist Governor	Undisputed Governor of Virginia; 1865–1868	Succeeded by Henry H. Wells; Provisional Governor
