= List of people executed in Virginia (pre-1972) =

The following is a list of people executed by the U.S. state of Virginia before 1972, when capital punishment was briefly abolished by the Supreme Court's ruling in Furman v. Georgia. For executions after the restoration of capital punishment by the Supreme Court's ruling in Gregg v. Georgia (1976), see List of people executed in Virginia.

Note: Cases in former counties that have since been absorbed by independent cities are listed under their present-day subdivision (ex. Virginia Beach City for Princess Anne County).

== Hanging ==
Slave executions

=== 1788–1799 ===
Name	Race	Age	Sex	Date of execution	County or Independent City	Crime	Victim(s)	Governor
Unknown	Black		M	July 21, 1788	?	Poisoning		Edmund Randolph
Archibald Campbell	White		M	July 31, 1788	Henrico	Murder	John McGill, white	Edmund Randolph
Lewis	Black		M	August 29, 1788	?			Edmund Randolph
Harry Cutts	Black		M	September 20, 1788	Nelson	Rape	Rosannah Barlow, white	Edmund Randolph
Ben	Black		M	December 5, 1788	Amherst	Theft-Stealing		Beverley Randolph
James Scott	White		M	December 5, 1788	Henrico (Note: Scott and Wallace were sentenced for crimes committed in Orange County and Fairfax County, respectively.)	Murder	James Johnston, white	Beverley Randolph
Levi Smith	White		M	December 5, 1788	Henrico	Highway robbery		Beverley Randolph
William Wallace	White		M	December 5, 1788	Henrico	Horse stealing		Beverley Randolph
Dick	Black		M	January 5, 1789	Spotsylvania	Murder	Francis Purvis, white (Dick's owner)	Beverley Randolph
Primus	Black		M	January 9, 1789	Spotsylvania	Murder	Francis Purvis, white (Dick's owner)	Beverley Randolph
Matthew Farley Jr.	White	42	M	January 31, 1789	Henrico (Note: Farley's crime was committed in Powhatan County.)	Murder	Male, black (slave)	Beverley Randolph
Thomas Williamson	White		M	January 31, 1789	Henrico	Murder	John Stark, white (brother-in-law)	Beverley Randolph
Creese	Black		F	March 14, 1789	Northampton	Arson		Beverley Randolph
Bristow	Black		M	April 13, 1789	Mecklenburg	Burglary	Samuel Edmondson, white	Beverley Randolph
George Bird	White		M	June 5, 1789	Albemarle	Horse stealing		Beverley Randolph
Jett Roach	White		M	July 3, 1789	Prince William	Horse stealing		Beverley Randolph
Phill	Black		M	July 31, 1789	Nottoway	Unspecified felony		Beverley Randolph
Frederick Briggs	White		M	October 16, 1789	Prince Edward (Note: Crime committed in Charlotte County.)	Horse stealing	Mr. Spencer, white	Beverley Randolph
William McElheney	White		M	October 16, 1789	Prince Edward	Horse stealing	Mr. Spencer, white	Beverley Randolph
Ned	Black		M	January 4, 1790	Southampton	Burglary	John Wright, white	Beverley Randolph
Joe	Black		M	March 26, 1790	Nottoway	Murder	Robert Robertson, white	Beverley Randolph
Ben	Black		M	March 26, 1790	Nottoway	Murder	Robert Robertson, white	Beverley Randolph
Solomon Watson	White		M	July 11, 1790	Frederick	Horse stealing		Beverley Randolph
Abraham	Black		M	June 19, 1790	Chesterfield	Burglary		Beverley Randolph
Moses	Black		M	August 14, 1790	Chesterfield	Robbery		Beverley Randolph
Isaac	Black		M	October 1, 1790	Nottoway	Poisoning	Robert Jones, white	Beverley Randolph
Mark	Black		M	October 1, 1790	Nottoway	Poisoning	Robert Jones, white	Beverley Randolph
James Medlicott	White		M	October 22, 1790	Frederick	Murder	William Hefferman, white	Beverley Randolph
Abraham	Black		M	January 4, 1791	Nottoway	Burglary		Beverley Randolph
Thomas Thomas	White		M	May 27, 1791	Albemarle	Horse stealing		Beverley Randolph
Moll	Black		F	July 8, 1791	Fauquier	Arson	Charles Marshall, white (owner)	Beverley Randolph
Ben	Black		M	September 2, 1791	Amelia	Rape	Sarah Buell, white	Beverley Randolph
Emanuel Driver	White		M	November 11, 1791	James City	Burglary		Beverley Randolph
John Driver	White		M	November 11, 1791	James City	Burglary		Beverley Randolph
William Smith	White		M	November 11, 1791	James City	Burglary		Beverley Randolph
Hugh Shavers	White		M	November 11, 1791	Henrico	Murder		Beverley Randolph
George	Black		M	November 14, 1791	Fauquier	Arson	Charles Marshall, white	Beverley Randolph
Jerry	Black		M	March 2, 1792	Gloucester	Burglary		Henry Lee III
Gumbo Billy	Black		M	March 2, 1792	Halifax	Murder	Male, black	Henry Lee III
Ralph C. Anderson	White		M	May 25, 1792	Henrico	Murder	William Green, white	Henry Lee III
Hugh Dowdall	White		M	July 6, 1792	Prince Edward	Counterfeiting	N/A	Henry Lee III
John Crane Jr.	White		M	July 6, 1792	Frederick	Murder	Abraham Van Horne, white	Henry Lee III
William Johnson	White		M	July 6, 1792	Frederick	Horse stealing		Henry Lee III
Daniel	Black		M	July 9, 1792	Northampton	Attempted murder	Male, white	Henry Lee III
Jack	Black		M	July 9, 1792	Northampton	Attempted murder	Male, white	Henry Lee III
Matthew	Black		M	July 9, 1792	Northampton	Attempted murder	Male, white	Henry Lee III
William Towe	White		M	July 23, 1792	Suffolk City	Horse stealing	N/A	Henry Lee III
Isaac	Black		M	September 3, 1792	Hanover	Burglary	Duke Anthony, white	Henry Lee III
Joe	Black		M	September 13, 1792	Spotsylvania	Murder	John Brock, white	Henry Lee III
Tom	Black		M	September 13, 1792	Spotsylvania	Murder	John Brock, white	Henry Lee III
John Young	White	47	M	October 19, 1792	Frederick	Horse stealing		Henry Lee III
Joshua Knight	White		M	November 15, 1792	Spotsylvania	Horse stealing		Henry Lee III
Will	Black		M	November 21, 1792	Cumberland	Murder	Female, child, black	Henry Lee III
Allen	Black		M	December 23, 1792	Charles City	Murder	James Crew, white	Henry Lee III
Harry	Black		M	January 11, 1793	Henrico	Poisoning		Henry Lee III
George	Black	16	M	April 18, 1793	Louisa	Murder	Ann, black	Henry Lee III
Tony	Black		M	May 10, 1793	Norfolk City	Burglary	Adam Lindsay, white	Henry Lee III
Daphne	Black		F	August 2, 1793	James City	Murder		Henry Lee III
Roger	Black		M	August 20, 1793	Newport News City	Slave revolt		Henry Lee III
Cromwell	Black		M	September 27, 1793	?	Burglary	Bob Saunders, white	Henry Lee III
Nelly	Black		F	October 4, 1793	James City	Murder	Joel Gathright, white	Henry Lee III
John Bullitt	White		M	October 18, 1793	Augusta	Horse stealing	John Nichols Sr., white	Henry Lee III
Billy	Black		M	October 25, 1793	Northumberland	Rape		Henry Lee III
James Conway	White		M	October 25, 1793	Frederick	Murder	John Johnstone, white	Henry Lee III
James McCabe	White		M	October 25, 1793	Frederick	Murder	John Johnstone, white	Henry Lee III
Charles	Black	21	M	March 3, 1794	Orange	Murder	Reuben, black	Henry Lee III
Jack	Black		M	March 15, 1794	Chesterfield	Conspiracy to poison	William and Sarah Claiborne, white	Henry Lee III
Nelson	Black		M	March 31, 1794	King George	Murder	John Morton, white (owner)	Henry Lee III
Lucy	Black		F	May 1794	Dinwiddie	Murder		Henry Lee III
George	Black		M	May 1794	Dinwiddie	Murder		Henry Lee III
Mingo	Black		M	May 30, 1794	Middlesex	Poisoning	George Turner, white	Henry Lee III
Essex	Black		M	June 10, 1794	King and Queen	Conspiracy to poison	George Turner, white	Henry Lee III
Joe	Black		M	June 24, 1794	Powhatan	Murder	Male, white (overseer)	Henry Lee III
Pompy	Black		M	June 24, 1794	Powhatan	Murder	Male, white (overseer)	Henry Lee III
James	Black		M	June 24, 1794	Powhatan	Murder		Henry Lee III
Ned	Black		M	August 11, 1794	Spotsylvania	Murder	James, black	Henry Lee III
Harry	Black		M	August 11, 1794	Spotsylvania	Murder	James, black	Henry Lee III
Emanuel	Black		M	August 22, 1794	Henrico	Murder	Male, child, black	Henry Lee III
Tom	Black		M	August 29, 1794	Dinwiddie	Murder	Thomas West, white	Henry Lee III
John Ford	White		M	September 1794	Prince Edward	Murder	Joseph Rowton, white	Henry Lee III
Jack	Black		M	November 28, 1794	Franklin	Rape	Sarah Hickerson, white	Henry Lee III
Unknown	Black		M	April 1795	Chesterfield			Robert Brooke
Spencer	Black		M	April 6, 1795	Pittsylvania	Rape	Lydia Allen, white (Note: Also attacked Elizabeth Bailey and Edy Allen.)	Robert Brooke
Sam	Black		M	June 12, 1795	Chesterfield	Rape	Sally Wise, white	Robert Brooke
Joe	Black		M	August 1, 1795	Lunenburg	Poisoning	Daniel Crenshaw, white (owner)	Robert Brooke
Ned	Black		M	August 7, 1795	Dinwiddie	Burglary-Arson		Robert Brooke
Ned	Black		M	August 14, 1795	Prince George	Murder	William Cureton, white (owner)	Robert Brooke
Ned	Black		M	September 25, 1795	Lancaster	Murder	Richard Davis, white	Robert Brooke
Allen	Black		M	October 30, 1795	Sussex	Poisoning	David Mason, white (owner)	Robert Brooke
Reuben	Black		M	October 30, 1795	Sussex	Poisoning	David Mason, white (owner)	Robert Brooke
Peter	Black		M	November 6, 1795	Middlesex	Murder	Alice, black	Robert Brooke
Tom	Black		M	November 6, 1795	Nottoway	Murder	John F. Jones, white	Robert Brooke
Joe	Black		M	November 13, 1795	Hampton City	Rape-Robbery	Elizabeth Bland, white	Robert Brooke
Chloe	Black		F	November 27, 1795	Prince Edward	Murder	James Bedford Walker, 2, white	Robert Brooke
Jack	Black		M	January 25, 1796	Fairfax	Murder		Robert Brooke
Stepney	Black		M	March 14, 1796	Mecklenburg	Murder	Tom, black	Robert Brooke
Ben	Black		M	April 29, 1796	Northumberland	Burglary	Dr. Walter Jones (owner) and Walter Vitanee, white (Note: Also robbed James Burwell (white).)	Robert Brooke
George	Black		M	July 29, 1796	Mathews	Burglary	Elizabeth Parrott, white	Robert Brooke
Harry	Black		M	July 29, 1796	Mathews	Burglary	Elizabeth Parrott, white	Robert Brooke
Lewis	Black		M	July 30, 1796	Greensville	Murder	John Howse, white	Robert Brooke
Fortune	Black		M	August 12, 1796	Shenandoah	Murder	Sukey, black	Robert Brooke
Billy Harris	Black		M	August 19, 1796	Henrico	Burglary	Phillip Russell, white	Robert Brooke
William	Black	13	M	September 16, 1796	Frederick	Arson	Rawleigh Colston, white (owner)	Robert Brooke
Archer Branch	White		M	October 28, 1796	Henrico	Horse stealing	N/A	Robert Brooke
John Young	White		M	October 28, 1796	Henrico	Horse stealing	N/A	Robert Brooke
Moll	Black		F	November 12, 1796	Halifax	Murder	Lux, black	Robert Brooke
Daniel	Black		M	December 13, 1796	Rockingham	Murder	Joseph, black	James Wood
Will	Black		M	February 17, 1797	Chesterfield	Murder	Abby Smith, white	James Wood
Sam	Black		M	April 22, 1797	King and Queen	Murder	Elizabeth Laughlin, white	James Wood
Dick	Black		M	June 20, 1797	Gloucester	Conspiracy to poison	Nathaniel Watlington, white (Dick's owner)	James Wood
Jenny	Black		F	July 7, 1797	Gloucester	Conspiracy to poison	Nathaniel Watlington, white (Dick's owner)	James Wood
Moses Nimrod	Black		M	July 14, 1797	Gloucester	Conspiracy to poison	Nathaniel Watlington, white (Dick's owner)	James Wood
Peter	Black	20	M	August 11, 1797	Surry	Rape	Dolly Walden, mixed (Note: Mulatta.)	James Wood
Dick	Black		M	September 22, 1797	New Kent	Theft-Stealing	Parkes Ball, white	James Wood
Roz Norman	Black		M	November 17, 1797	Frederick	Rape	Patty Poe, 13, white	James Wood
Jesse Scott	Mixed (Note: Mulatto.)		M	November 17, 1797	Frederick	Horse stealing		James Wood
Davy	Black		M	December 10, 1797	Isle of Wight	Robbery	William Boykin, white (owner)	James Wood
Jack	Black		M	February 13, 1798	Wythe	Horse stealing	N/A	James Wood
Claibourne	Black		M	February 16, 1798	Petersburg City	Arson	N/A (Note: Burned the city jail after being pardoned for a capital burglary conviction.)	James Wood
Joe	Black		M	March 1798	?	Arson		James Wood
Caesar	Black		M	March 9, 1798	Petersburg City	Burglary	Rev. William Harrison, white	James Wood
Glasgow	Black		M	March 9, 1798	Petersburg City	Burglary	Rev. William Harrison, white	James Wood
Abram	Black		M	March 12, 1798	Greensville	Murder	Holland, black	James Wood
Polly	Black		F	March 23, 1798	York	Murder	William Hughes, white	James Wood
Gabriel	Black		M	June 15, 1798	James City	Burglary	William Wilkinson, white	James Wood
Joshua	Black		M	June 16, 1798	King George	Burglary		James Wood
Robin	Black		M	June 16, 1798	King George	Burglary		James Wood
Ralph	Black		M	July 20, 1798	Frederick	Poisoning	Mr. (owner) and Mrs. James Strother, white	James Wood
Jack	Black		M	July 31, 1798	Prince William	Burglary	James Kemps, white	James Wood
Daniel	Black		M	September 21, 1798	Westmoreland	Murder	George Baber, white	James Wood
Willoughby	Black		M	September 21, 1798	Westmoreland	Murder	George Baber, white	James Wood
Daniel	Black		M	November 2, 1798	Petersburg City	Highway robbery	Christopher Jackson, white	James Wood
Lewis	Black		M	November 9, 1798	Chesterfield	Highway robbery	Obedience Williams, white	James Wood
Nat	Black		M	November 30, 1798	Northampton	Highway robbery		James Wood
Phillip	Black		M	December 14, 1798	Virginia Beach City	Rape	Molly Benthal, white	James Wood
Ned	Black		M	January 1799	Southampton	Murder	Benjamin and Benjamin Williams Jr., white	James Wood
Bob	Black		M	January 11, 1799	Henrico	Attempted murder	James Dickie, white	James Wood
Simon	Black		M	January 18, 1799	Suffolk City	Burglary	Three people, white (Note: Joseph Hattersley, William Fisher, and Ephraim Hugford.)	James Wood
Zach	Black		M	January 18, 1799	Shenandoah	Murder	John Young Sr., white (owner)	James Wood
Burgess	Black		M	January 22, 1799	Middlesex	Slave revolt		James Wood
Billy	Black		M	January 22, 1799	Middlesex	Slave revolt		James Wood
Nat	Black		M	February 15, 1799	Mecklenburg	Murder	Elijah Graves, white (owner)	James Wood
Horatio	Black	27	M	March 1, 1799	Orange	Rape	Margaret Webb, white	James Wood
Isaac	Black		M	March 15, 1799	Henrico	Burglary	David Lambert, white	James Wood
Beeks	Black		M	April 18, 1799	Pittsylvania	Murder	Thomas Elliott, white (owner)	James Wood
Solomon	Black		M	April 18, 1799	Pittsylvania	Murder	Thomas Elliott, white (owner)	James Wood
Isaac	Black		M	June 4, 1799	Surry	Murder	Will, child, black	James Wood
Amey	Black		F	June 15, 1799	King and Queen	Murder	Isbell and Harrison, black	James Wood
Issac	Black		M	October 18, 1799	Hanover	Rape	Nancy Woody, white	James Wood
Sam	Black		M	November 25, 1799	Southampton	Murder		James Wood
Hatter Isaac	Black		M	November 25, 1799	Southampton	Murder		James Wood
Jerry	Black		M	November 25, 1799	Southampton	Murder		James Wood

=== 1800s ===
Name	Race	Age	Sex	Date of execution	County or Independent City	Crime	Victim(s)	Governor
Ned	Black		M	August 8, 1800	Sussex	Burglary		James Monroe
Tom	Black		M	August 20, 1800	Henry	Murder	Oberdena Creasey, white	James Monroe
Abram	Black		M	August 31, 1800	Buckingham	Murder	Capt. John Patterson, white (owner)	James Monroe
Harry	Black		M	September 5, 1800	Hanover	Rape	Keziah Butler, white	James Monroe
Mike	Black		M	September 12, 1800	Henrico	Slave revolt		James Monroe
John	Black		M	September 12, 1800	Henrico	Slave revolt		James Monroe
Solomon	Black		M	September 12, 1800	Henrico	Slave revolt		James Monroe
Nat	Black		M	September 12, 1800	Henrico	Slave revolt		James Monroe
Issac	Black		M	September 12, 1800	Henrico	Slave revolt		James Monroe
Will	Black		M	September 12, 1800	Henrico	Slave revolt		James Monroe
Frank	Black		M	September 15, 1800	Henrico	Slave revolt		James Monroe
Martin	Black		M	September 15, 1800	Henrico	Slave revolt		James Monroe
Billy	Black		M	September 15, 1800	Henrico	Slave revolt		James Monroe
Charles	Black		M	September 15, 1800	Henrico	Slave revolt		James Monroe
Michael	Black		M	September 15, 1800	Henrico	Slave revolt		James Monroe
Isham	Black		M	September 18, 1800	Henrico	Slave revolt		James Monroe
Jupiter	Black		M	September 18, 1800	Henrico	Slave revolt		James Monroe
Peter	Black		M	September 18, 1800	Henrico	Slave revolt		James Monroe
Sam	Black		M	September 18, 1800	Henrico	Slave revolt		James Monroe
Pawney	Black		M	September 18, 1800	Henrico	Slave revolt		James Monroe
Peter	Black		M	October 3, 1800	Greensville	Rape	Frances Lanier, white	James Monroe
Sam Byrd	Black		M	October 10, 1800	Henrico	Slave revolt		James Monroe
Gabriel Prosser	Black	24	M	October 10, 1800	Henrico	Slave revolt		James Monroe
George	Black		M	October 10, 1800	Henrico	Slave revolt		James Monroe
Gilbert	Black		M	October 10, 1800	Henrico	Slave revolt		James Monroe
Isaac	Black		M	October 10, 1800	Henrico	Slave revolt		James Monroe
Laddis	Black		M	October 10, 1800	Henrico	Slave revolt		James Monroe
Michael	Black		M	October 10, 1800	Henrico	Slave revolt		James Monroe
Sam	Black		M	October 10, 1800	Henrico	Slave revolt		James Monroe
Tom	Black		M	October 10, 1800	Henrico	Slave revolt		James Monroe
William	Black		M	October 10, 1800	Henrico	Slave revolt		James Monroe
Peter	Black		M	October 24, 1800	Dinwiddie	Slave revolt		James Monroe
James	Black		M	November 14, 1800	Henrico	Slave revolt		James Monroe
Aaron	Black		M	February 13, 1801	Albemarle	Burglary	Philip Moore, white	James Monroe
Stephen	Black		M	March 6, 1801	Henrico	Murder	Aaron, black	James Monroe
Nan	Black		F	April 10, 1801	King George	Unspecified felony		James Monroe
George Poindexter	White	23	M	July 10, 1801	Franklin	Murder	William Alexander, white	James Monroe
Ned	Black		M	January 1802	Amelia	Murder	Daniel Noble, white	James Monroe
Aaron	Black		M	January 10, 1802	Amherst	Murder	Edward Fitzpatrick, white	James Monroe
Joe	Black		M	January 16, 1802	Nottoway	Slave revolt		James Monroe
Bob	Black		M	January 16, 1802	Nottoway	Slave revolt		James Monroe
Isaac	Black		M	February 12, 1802	Brunswick	Slave revolt		James Monroe
Phill	Black		M	February 12, 1802	Brunswick	Slave revolt		James Monroe
Hall	Black		M	February 19, 1802	Mecklenburg	Murder	William, black	James Monroe
George	Black		M	February 26, 1802	Southampton	Murder	William Summerell, white (overseer)	James Monroe
Henry	Black		M	February 26, 1802	Southampton	Murder	William Summerell, white (overseer)	James Monroe
Hercules	Black		M	February 26, 1802	Southampton	Murder	William Summerell, white (overseer)	James Monroe
Punch	Black		M	February 26, 1802	Prince Edward	Poisoning	Anderson and Molly Wade, white	James Monroe
Bob	Black		M	March 2, 1802	Lunenburg	Poisoning	John S. Ravencroft, white (overseer)	James Monroe
Cato	Black		M	March 12, 1802	Caroline	Murder	Edward Broaddus, white (owner)	James Monroe
Patrick	Black		M	May 1, 1802	Caroline	Murder		James Monroe
Sancho	Black		M	May 15, 1802	Halifax	Slave revolt		James Monroe
Frank	Black		M	May 15, 1802	Halifax	Slave revolt		James Monroe
Martin	Black		M	May 15, 1802	Halifax	Slave revolt		James Monroe
Abram	Black		M	May 15, 1802	Halifax	Slave revolt		James Monroe
Absalom	Black		M	May 15, 1802	Halifax	Slave revolt		James Monroe
Jeremiah	Black		M	May 28, 1802	Norfolk City	Slave revolt		James Monroe
Jonas	Black		M	June 4, 1802	Norfolk City	Murder	Betty, black	James Monroe
Abraham	Black		M	June 5, 1802	Loudoun	Poisoning	Samuel and Elizabeth Dishman, white	James Monroe
Dick	Black		M	June 11, 1802	Mecklenburg	Poisoning	John Gregory, white (owner)	James Monroe
John	Black		M	July 29, 1802	Halifax	Slave revolt	Mrs. Lewis Ragsdale, white	James Monroe
John Semphill	White		M	May 17, 1803	James City	Murder	Sarah Semphill and her two daughters, 25 and infants, white (wife and children)	John Page
Sarah	Black		F	July 15, 1803	Albemarle	Aggravated assault	Fannie Mills, white	John Page
Charity	Black		F	October 28, 1803	Virginia Beach City	Poisoning	Thomas Lawson (owner) and his family, white	John Page
George	Black		M	October 28, 1803	Virginia Beach City	Poisoning	Thomas Lawson (owner) and his family, white	John Page
Ted	Black		M	October 28, 1803	Mecklenburg	Murder	William Stainback, white	John Page
James Scott	Black		M	November 11, 1803	Frederick	Murder	W. C. Simmerton, white	John Page
James Cherry	White		M	November 25, 1803	Suffolk City	Murder	William Hudson, white	John Page
Gabriel Reed	White		M	November 25, 1803	Suffolk City	Murder	James Butts, black	John Page
Lewis McWhaine	White	47	M	November 28, 1803	Albemarle	Murder	Dr. James Hopkins, white (father-in-law)	John Page
Jack	Black		M	May 4, 1804	Bedford	Murder	John Hill, white (owner)	John Page
George Bartlett	White		M	May 18, 1804	Henrico	Murder		John Page
James Hennesey	White		M	June 1, 1804	Frederick	Murder	Patrick Hogan, white	John Page
Daniel	Black		M	June 14, 1804	Lancaster	Murder	William Mitchell, white	John Page
Jesse	Mixed (Note: Mulatto.)		M	September 7, 1804	Frederick	Rape		John Page
Reuben Howman	White		M	November 16, 1804	Spotsylvania	Murder	Female, white (wife)	John Page
Abraham	Black		M	February 15, 1805	Stafford	Slave revolt		John Page
Billy Scott	Black		M	March 15, 1805	Henrico	Rape	Anna Miller, white	John Page
Archie	Black		M	May 14, 1805	Botetourt	Rape	Rosanna Switzer, white	John Page
Peter	Black		M	July 9, 1805	Patrick	Rape	Elizabeth Adams, infant, white	John Page
Peter Twine	Black		M	November 30, 1805	Fairfax	Rape	Elizabeth King, white	John Page
Moses	Black		M	January 17, 1806	James City	Attempted murder-Robbery	Henry Green, white (owner)	William H. Cabell
Fanny	Black		F	February 28, 1806	Charlotte	Poisoning	Thomas Goode, white	William H. Cabell
Charlotte	Black		F	March 15, 1806	Caroline	Murder	Mary Caffrey, white	William H. Cabell
Crease	Black		F	May 30, 1806	Chesterfield	Murder	Martha Morrissette, white (owner)	William H. Cabell
Sall	Black		F	July 11, 1806	Chesterfield	Murder	Martha Morrissette, white (owner)	William H. Cabell
Harry	Black		M	July 18, 1806	Frederick	Murder-Robbery	Mr. Stewart, white	William H. Cabell
Jack	Black		M	September 19, 1806	Chesterfield	Burglary		William H. Cabell
Kitt	Black		M	September 19, 1806	Chesterfield	Burglary		William H. Cabell
Isaac	Black		M	March 13, 1807	Pittsylvania	Robbery	Richard Johnson, white	William H. Cabell
Billy	Black		M	May 29, 1807	Nottoway	Poisoning	Beasley family, white	William H. Cabell
Moses	Black		M	November 2, 1807	Hanover	Robbery	John and Hamilton Tomlinson, white	William H. Cabell
Bill Williams	Black		M	January 14, 1808	Norfolk City	Murder	Henry, black	William H. Cabell
Tom	Black		M	January 29, 1808	Albemarle	Conspiracy to poison	James Cocke (owner) and family, white	William H. Cabell
Will	Black		M	March 4, 1808	Norfolk City	Highway robbery	John Ralph and Silas Jones, white	William H. Cabell
Jim	Black		M	March 19, 1808	Campbell	Murder	William Frith, white	William H. Cabell
Ben	Black		M	April 18, 1808	Charles City	Murder	Ambrose Green, white	William H. Cabell
Lewis	Black		M	April 18, 1808	Charles City	Murder	Ambrose Green, white	William H. Cabell
Spencer	Black		M	April 18, 1808	Charles City	Murder	Ambrose Green, white	William H. Cabell
John Blanks	White		M	May 9, 1808	Prince Edward	Murder		William H. Cabell
Samuel Hill	White		M	August 8, 1808	Spotsylvania	Murder	William Summerson, white	William H. Cabell
Mooklar	Black		M	September 28, 1808	Westmoreland	Rape	Ann Jett, white	William H. Cabell
Dick	Black	17	M	December 20, 1808	Southampton	Rape (Note: "Carnal knowledge of a minor".)		John Tyler Sr.
Jacob	Black		M	January 1, 1809	Nelson	Slave revolt	N/A	John Tyler Sr.
Flora	Black		F	May 5, 1809	Frederick	Murder		John Tyler Sr.
Edmund	Black		M	July 14, 1809	Mathews	Murder	John Matthews, white	John Tyler Sr.
Frank	Black		M	July 14, 1809	Mathews	Murder	John Matthews, white	John Tyler Sr.
Jack	Black		M	July 14, 1809	Mathews	Murder	John Matthews, white	John Tyler Sr.
James	Black		M	July 14, 1809	Mathews	Murder	John Matthews, white	John Tyler Sr.
Sam	Black		M	October 27, 1809	Montgomery	Murder	Archibald Thompson, white (owner)	John Tyler Sr.

=== 1810s ===
Name	Race	Age	Sex	Date of execution	County or Independent City	Crime	Victim(s)	Governor
Sutton	Black		M	March 16, 1810	Gloucester	Highway robbery	Henry Sadler, white	John Tyler Sr.
Major Jackson	Black		M	June 1, 1810	Goochland	Aggravated assault	Rebecca Anderson, white	John Tyler Sr.
Glasgow	Black		M	July 28, 1810	Culpeper	Arson	Dr. Hawes, white	John Tyler Sr.
Ned	Black		M	October 1810	Chesterfield	Unspecified felony		John Tyler Sr.
Will	Black		M	December 14, 1810	Prince Edward	Murder		John Tyler Sr.
Dick	Black		M	December 27, 1810	Greensville	Burglary-Attempted rape	Turner family, white	John Tyler Sr.
Ben Burns	Black		M	February 1, 1811	Botetourt	Murder	Isaac Shoots and Henry Taylor, white (owners)	James Monroe
Frank Bush	Black		M	February 1, 1811	Botetourt	Murder	Isaac Shoots and Henry Taylor, white (owners)	James Monroe
John Darrell	Black		M	February 1, 1811	Botetourt	Murder	Isaac Shoots and Henry Taylor, white (owners)	James Monroe
Perry	Black		M	February 1, 1811	Botetourt	Murder	Isaac Shoots and Henry Taylor, white (owners)	James Monroe
Bob Toogood	Black		M	February 1, 1811	Botetourt	Murder	Isaac Shoots and Henry Taylor, white (owners)	James Monroe
Stephen	Black		M	May 11, 1811	Fauquier	Rape	Lucinda Jeffries, white	George William Smith
Abram	Black		M	March 13, 1812	Bedford	Murder	Dr. Samuel Griffin, white (owner)	James Barbour
Tom	Black		M	May 18, 1812	Henry	Murder	John Smith, white (owner)	James Barbour
Isaac	Black		M	October 2, 1812	Suffolk City	Rape	Polly Butler, white	James Barbour
Amy	Black		F	December 11, 1812	Augusta	Murder	Unknown, infant, white	James Barbour
Harry	Black		M	April 23, 1813	Mathews	Unspecified felony		James Barbour
Humphrey	Black		M	April 23, 1813	Mathews	Unspecified felony		James Barbour
Phill	Black		M	August 21, 1813	King and Queen	Murder-Burglary	Benjamin Faulkner, white (owner)	James Barbour
Mike	Black		M	August 27, 1813	Amelia	Burglary	Boswell Tucker, white	James Barbour
Isham	Black		M	September 3, 1813	Prince Edward	Murder	Bob, black	James Barbour
Robin	Black		M	September 5, 1813	Sussex	Burglary	Nancy Holosworth, white	James Barbour
Caesar	Black		M	October 8, 1813	Prince William	Highway robbery	Edward Simpson, white	James Barbour
William Proctor	White		M	November 13, 1813 (Note: Executed by firing squad.)	Norfolk City (Military)	Desertion	N/A	James Barbour
Cadet LaRue	White		M	December 10, 1813	Portsmouth City	Murder	Female, white (wife)	James Barbour
George	Black		M	February 1814	King George	Unspecified felony		James Barbour
Andrew	Black		M	May 3, 1814	Dinwiddie	Murder	Joel Smith, white	James Barbour
Hal	Black		M	May 3, 1814	Dinwiddie	Murder	Joel Smith, white	James Barbour
Matt	Black	14	M	May 24, 1814	Bedford	Murder	Ann Adams, white	James Barbour
Jeremiah Lucas	White		M	May 28, 1814	Giles	Murder	Male, white (girlfriend's husband)	James Barbour
Isaac	Black		M	July 1, 1814	Bedford	Rape	Anne Saunders, white	James Barbour
Isaac	Black		M	August 5, 1814	Fairfax	Rape		James Barbour
Ralph	Black		M	August 20, 1814	Botetourt	Murder	Fan, black	James Barbour
Hercules	Black	17	M	November 11, 1814	Shenandoah	Aggravated burglary	Mr. and Mrs. Thomas Hall, white	James Barbour
James Archibald	White		M	May 19, 1815	Halifax	Murder		Wilson Cary Nicholas
Caesar	Mixed		M	July 14, 1815	Norfolk City	Murder	James Flood, white (constable)	Wilson Cary Nicholas
Archer	Black		M	October 27, 1815	Chesterfield	Burglary		Wilson Cary Nicholas
Mack	Black		M	March 29, 1816	Louisa	Slave revolt	N/A	Wilson Cary Nicholas
Matt	Black		M	March 29, 1816	Louisa	Slave revolt	N/A	Wilson Cary Nicholas
Ned	Black		M	March 29, 1816	Louisa	Slave revolt	N/A	Wilson Cary Nicholas
Tom	Black		M	March 29, 1816	Louisa	Slave revolt	N/A	Wilson Cary Nicholas
Charles	Black		M	April 5, 1816	Spotsylvania	Slave revolt	N/A	Wilson Cary Nicholas
Emanuel	Black		M	April 5, 1816	Spotsylvania	Slave revolt	N/A	Wilson Cary Nicholas
John Fox	Black		M	June 28, 1816	Gloucester	Arson	William Tupman, white	Wilson Cary Nicholas
Nelson	Black		M	June 28, 1816	Gloucester	Arson	William Tupman, white	Wilson Cary Nicholas
Watt	Black		M	July 12, 1816	Rockbridge	Murder	Mike, black	Wilson Cary Nicholas
Delphy	Black		F	August 10, 1816	Louisa	Murder	Isabella Mitchell, white	Wilson Cary Nicholas
Clara	Black		F	October 4, 1816	Spotsylvania	Murder	Grace, black	Wilson Cary Nicholas
Daniel	Black		M	January 31, 1817	Cumberland	Poisoning	Four people, white (Note: Jacob Bransford (owner), his wife Elizabeth, their daughter Martha, and Charles A. Ballow.)	James Patton Preston
Miles	Black		M	April 17, 1817	Isle of Wight	Murder	William Snow, white	James Patton Preston
Luke	Black		M	August 17, 1817	Northampton	Murder	Adam Caple, white	James Patton Preston
Anthony	Black		M	November 14, 1817	Franklin	Rape	Jemiah Young, white	James Patton Preston
Caty	Black		F	January 30, 1818	Brunswick	Murder	Sarah Harwell, white	James Patton Preston
Jacob	Black		M	March 10, 1818	Sussex	Burglary	William Morry, white	James Patton Preston
John	Black		M	March 10, 1818	Sussex	Burglary		James Patton Preston
Sylvanus Brewer	White		M	May 22, 1818	Russell	Murder	Samuel Indicut, white	James Patton Preston
Jeremiah Oldham	White		M	July 10, 1818	Northumberland	Murder	John S. Cralle, white (deputy sheriff)	James Patton Preston
Landon	Black		M	July 10, 1818	Frederick	Murder	Robert Berkeley, white (owner)	James Patton Preston
Randolph	Black		M	July 10, 1818	Frederick	Murder	Robert Berkeley, white (owner)	James Patton Preston
Sarah	Black		F	July 10, 1818	Frederick	Murder	Robert Berkeley, white (owner)	James Patton Preston
Manuel	Black		M	July 14, 1818	King George	Murder	Langford Harrison, white	James Patton Preston
Delp	Black		M	July 26, 1818	Louisa	Poisoning		James Patton Preston
Lewis	Black		M	September 4, 1818	Lunenburg	Rape	Barbara Rucks, white	James Patton Preston
Tom	Black		M	September 4, 1818	Norfolk City	Theft-Stealing	Ralph P. Keeling, white	James Patton Preston
Joe	Black		M	September 25, 1818	Pittsylvania	Murder	Major Nathaniel Cranshaw, white (owner)	James Patton Preston
Squire	Black		M	September 25, 1818	Pittsylvania	Murder	Major Nathaniel Cranshaw, white (owner)	James Patton Preston
Jack	Black		M	October 2, 1818	Orange	Rape	Elizabeth Wright, white	James Patton Preston
Robert Carlton	White		M	October 27, 1818	Henrico	Murder-Robbery	John Peatross, white	James Patton Preston
Henry	Black		M	March 6, 1819	Botetourt	Murder	George Fringen, white	James Patton Preston
Abner Vance	White		M	July 16, 1819	Washington (Note: Change of venue from Russell County.)	Murder	Lewis Horton, white	James Patton Preston
Reuben	Black	22	M	August 20, 1819	Campbell	Rape	Sarah Fox, white	James Patton Preston
James Vest	White		M	December 17, 1819	Chesterfield	Murder	Female, white (wife)	Thomas Mann Randolph Jr.
Stephen	Black		M	December 24, 1819	Charles City	Aggravated assault-Robbery	Isaac Brown, black	Thomas Mann Randolph Jr.

=== 1820s ===
Name	Race	Age	Sex	Date of execution	County or Independent City	Crime	Victim(s)	Governor
Moses	Black		M	January 21, 1820	Madison	Conspiracy to murder	Henry (owner) and Eliza Barnes, white	Thomas Mann Randolph Jr.
Chaney	Black		F	January 21, 1820	Madison	Conspiracy to murder	Henry (owner) and Eliza Barnes, white	Thomas Mann Randolph Jr.
Robin	Black		M	March 3, 1820	Amherst	Murder	Isaac, black	Thomas Mann Randolph Jr.
Jordan	Black		M	March 24, 1820	Henrico	Murder	William Woodram, white	Thomas Mann Randolph Jr.
Abram	Black		M	April 7, 1820	James City	Murder	Nat, black	Thomas Mann Randolph Jr.
Ned	Black		M	June 9, 1820	King William	Murder	Elizabeth Smith, white	Thomas Mann Randolph Jr.
Bob	Black		M	August 12, 1820	Sussex	Attempted murder	David Mason, white (owner)	Thomas Mann Randolph Jr.
Jack	Black		M	November 17, 1820	New Kent	Murder	Daniel B. and Mildred B. Ford, white	Thomas Mann Randolph Jr.
Burrill	Black		M	November 24, 1820	Surry	Burglary	Priscilla Wren, black	Thomas Mann Randolph Jr.
Jeff	Black		M	November 24, 1820	Surry	Burglary	Priscilla Wren, black	Thomas Mann Randolph Jr.
John	Black		M	May 4, 1821	Orange	Murder	King, black	Thomas Mann Randolph Jr.
Manuel Garcia	White	37	M	June 1, 1821	Norfolk City	Murder	Peter Lagaudette, white	Thomas Mann Randolph Jr.
Jose Castillano	White	49	M	June 1, 1821	Norfolk City	Murder	Peter Lagaudette, white	Thomas Mann Randolph Jr.
Jesse Carbell	Mixed (Note: Mulatto.)		M	June 9, 1821	Suffolk City	Murder	Capt. Shelton, white	Thomas Mann Randolph Jr.
Armistead	Black		M	June 11, 1821	Charlotte	Murder	William Graves, white	Thomas Mann Randolph Jr.
Winston	Black		M	July 6, 1821	Orange	Rape	Sarah Baxter, white	Thomas Mann Randolph Jr.
Patrick	Black		M	August 10, 1821	Louisa	Murder	Samuel P. Wade, white	Thomas Mann Randolph Jr.
Abel	Black		M	August 15, 1821	Southampton	Murder	James and Amelia Powell, white	Thomas Mann Randolph Jr.
Celia	Black		F	August 15, 1821	Southampton	Murder	James and Amelia Powell, white	Thomas Mann Randolph Jr.
Tom	Black		M	September 25, 1821	Campbell	Murder	Martha Harris and Nancy Gregory, white	Thomas Mann Randolph Jr.
Ben Hopkins	White		M	October 28, 1821	Rockingham	Murder		Thomas Mann Randolph Jr.
Pat	Black		F	November 3, 1821	Charlotte	Murder	Martha Farris, white	Thomas Mann Randolph Jr.
John Gillman	White		M	November 30, 1821	Caroline	Murder-Burglary	Jane Coats, white	Thomas Mann Randolph Jr.
William Reid	White		M	December 14, 1821	Caroline	Murder-Burglary	Jane Coats, white	Thomas Mann Randolph Jr.
Henry	Black	13	M	March 1, 1822	Mecklenburg	Murder	Three people, white (Note: His owner's three daughters, Jane Hunt, Lilly Ann Hunt, and Obedience Hunt, ages 8, 12, and 18.)	Thomas Mann Randolph Jr.
Ned	Black		M	March 29, 1822	Cumberland	Attempted murder	Elizabeth Whitlock, white	Thomas Mann Randolph Jr.
Michael Montgole	White		M	June 21, 1822	Montgomery (Note: Change of venue from Giles County.)	Murder	Female, white (wife)	Thomas Mann Randolph Jr.
Ned	Mixed		M	July 26, 1822	Norfolk City	Rape	Elizabeth Riggs, white	Thomas Mann Randolph Jr.
Plato	Black		M	September 21, 1822	Bedford	Murder	Edy, black	Thomas Mann Randolph Jr.
Ralph	Black		M	November 15, 1822	Bedford	Murder	Sophia Coleman, infant, white	Thomas Mann Randolph Jr.
Scott	Black		M	June 6, 1823	Lunenburg	Murder	Bob, black	James Pleasants
Dempsey Carr	White		M	June 20, 1823	Isle of Wight	Murder-Robbery	John McCall, white	James Pleasants
Lewis	Black		M	June 27, 1823	Norfolk City	Murder	William Walker, white	James Pleasants
Alexander	Black		M	July 11, 1823	Orange	Rape	Jane Long, white	James Pleasants
Jasper	Black		M	July 11, 1823	Norfolk City	Murder	William Walker, white	James Pleasants
Charles	Black		M	July 12, 1823	Campbell	Rape	Frances Clark, white	James Pleasants
Bob Ferebee	Black		M	July 25, 1823	Norfolk City	Murder	David Manning, white	James Pleasants
Bill	Black		M	August 7, 1823	Augusta	Rape		James Pleasants
John	Black		M	November 21, 1823	Chesterfield	Rape	Female, white	James Pleasants
Mingo	Black		M	January 16, 1824	Suffolk City	Murder	John Kelly, white	James Pleasants
Sam	Black		M	March 26, 1824	New Kent	Murder	Charles, black	James Pleasants
Humphrey	Black		M	April 2, 1824	Hanover	Murder	George King, white	James Pleasants
Thornton	Black		M	April 2, 1824	Hanover	Murder	George King, white	James Pleasants
Reuben Wicks	White		M	June 24, 1824	Nottoway	Murder		James Pleasants
Jack	Black		M	September 3, 1824	Suffolk City	Aggravated burglary	Garrett Knight and Thomas Gill, white (Note: Condemned on three counts: burning a haystack, burglarizing and burning Knight's home, and burglarizing Gill's home and burning his barn.)	James Pleasants
Dick	Black		M	October 26, 1824	Culpeper	Aggravated burglary (Note: Burglarized Teale's home, and raped Wade who was inside.)	John Teale and Lucy Wade, white	James Pleasants
Lawrence	Black		M	October 26, 1824	Culpeper	Aggravated burglary		James Pleasants
Reuben	Black		M	December 1, 1824	Orange	Murder	James Dennison, white (owner)	James Pleasants
Hudson Sprouce	White		M	December 10, 1824	Rockingham (Note: Change of venue from Albemarle County.)	Murder	Susan Sprouce, white (relative)	James Pleasants
Stephen	Black		M	December 31, 1824	Brunswick	Murder	Cary, black	James Pleasants
Sam	Black		M	January 21, 1825	Suffolk City	Murder	Simon, black	James Pleasants
Ned	Black		M	February 4, 1825	Dinwiddie	Arson		James Pleasants
Jim	Black		M	April 8, 1825	King William	Murder	Thomas Edwards, white (owner)	James Pleasants
Johnson	Black		M	April 8, 1825	King William	Murder	Thomas Edwards, white (owner)	James Pleasants
Tom	Black		M	June 1825	Lancaster	Murder		James Pleasants
Joseph Burgess	White		M	July 8, 1825	Prince William	Murder	Charles Gollyhorn, white	James Pleasants
Moses	Black		M	September 29, 1825	Hanover	Murder	Armistead, black	James Pleasants
Isaac	Black	16	M	October 21, 1825	Albemarle	Attempted rape	Sally Callerton, white	James Pleasants
Bartlett	Black		M	April 14, 1826	King and Queen	Murder	Jack, black	John Tyler
Bill	Black		M	May 5, 1826	Madison	Murder	Elijah Powell, white (owner)	John Tyler
Henry	Black		M	May 5, 1826	Madison	Murder	Elijah Powell, white (owner)	John Tyler
William Hooe	White		M	July 3, 1826	Fairfax	Murder-Robbery	William Simpson, white	John Tyler
Stephen	Black		M	July 28, 1826	King George	Unspecified felony		John Tyler
Milly	Black		F	July 28, 1826	Patrick	Murder	Male, newborn, black (child)	John Tyler
Solomon	Black		M	August 4, 1826	Prince Edward	Murder	Nancy Morgan, white	John Tyler
Dinwiddie	Black		M	August 11, 1826	Sussex	Rape	Mary Jane Holloway, child, white	John Tyler
Charles	Black		M	August 25, 1826	Cumberland	Murder	Sally Hudgins, white	John Tyler
Jim	Black		M	October 6, 1826	Accomack	Burglary		John Tyler
Leven	Black		M	October 6, 1826	Accomack	Burglary	Abigail Mister, white	John Tyler
George	Black		M	October 6, 1826	Virginia Beach City	Highway robbery	John Camp Jr., white	John Tyler
David	Black		M	November 10, 1826	Brunswick	Murder	Wright Griffin, white (owner)	John Tyler
Archer	Black		M	April 27, 1827	Lunenburg	Murder	John Hamlin, white (owner)	William Branch Giles
Billy	Black		M	April 27, 1827	Lunenburg	Murder	John Hamlin, white (owner)	William Branch Giles
David	Black		M	April 27, 1827	Lunenburg	Murder	John Hamlin, white (owner)	William Branch Giles
Nathan	Black		M	April 27, 1827	Lunenburg	Murder	John Hamlin, white (owner)	William Branch Giles
Sam	Black		M	April 27, 1827	Lunenburg	Murder	John Hamlin, white (owner)	William Branch Giles
Big Stephen	Black		M	April 27, 1827	Lunenburg	Murder	John Hamlin, white (owner)	William Branch Giles
Tom	Black		M	April 27, 1827	Lunenburg	Murder	John Hamlin, white (owner)	William Branch Giles
Peter	Black		M	May 1827	Essex	Unspecified felony		William Branch Giles
Jack	Black		M	May 11, 1827	Virginia Beach City	Highway robbery	John Camp Jr., white	William Branch Giles
Edmond	Black		M	June 1, 1827	Lunenburg	Attempted murder	Stephen Pettus, white	William Branch Giles
Jim	Black		M	June 15, 1827	Northampton	Burglary		William Branch Giles
Jonathan DeVaughn	White	70	M	June 27, 1827	Alexandria City (Note: Then part of the District of Columbia.)	Murder	Tobias Martin, white	William Branch Giles
Lewis	Black		M	July 27, 1827	Cumberland	Murder	James Fontaine, white (owner)	William Branch Giles
Jose Cesares	White		M	August 17, 1827	Henrico (Federal)	Murder	Multiple people on the Crawford, white (Note: Ship's passengers and crew murdered in the Atlantic Ocean during a hijacking.)	William Branch Giles
Felix Barbeito	White		M	August 17, 1827	Henrico (Federal)	Murder	Multiple people on the Crawford, white	William Branch Giles
Jose Morando	White	30	M	August 17, 1827	Henrico (Federal)	Murder	Multiple people on the Crawford, white	William Branch Giles
Henry	Black		M	September 7, 1827	Mathews	Aggravated burglary	Thomas (owner) and Ledelia Davis, white	William Branch Giles
Judy	Black		F	October 26, 1827	Fluvanna	Murder	Sarah Brunson, white (loan owner) (Note: Judy was loaned to Brunson by her legal owner, Mildred Ware.)	William Branch Giles
Buck	Black		M	November 1, 1827	Halifax	Rape		William Branch Giles
Allen	Black		M	November 30, 1827	Washington	Murder	Jonathan Smith, white (owner)	William Branch Giles
Frank	Black		M	December 28, 1827	Dinwiddie	Unspecified felony		William Branch Giles
Nelly	Black		F	March 17, 1828	Southampton	Murder	Sally Shield, white	William Branch Giles
Robert	Black		M	June 20, 1828	Petersburg City	Murder-Robbery	Rick O. Maher, white	William Branch Giles
Sam	Black	18	M	June 23, 1828	Lancaster	Murder-Rape	Miss B. George, white	William Branch Giles
Jeffrey	Black		M	August 22, 1828	Louisa	Rape	Lucy Schooler, white	William Branch Giles
Shadrack	Black		M	November 21, 1828	Pittsylvania	Murder	George, black	William Branch Giles
Joseph Whiteford	White		M	December 1828	Chesterfield	Murder	Mr. Mosby and Mr. Anderson, white	William Branch Giles
Harry	Black		M	January 9, 1829	Powhatan	Murder	Elbert Mosby, white (owner)	William Branch Giles
Lewis	Black		M	July 24, 1829	Mecklenburg	Rape	Amey Baker, white	William Branch Giles
Gabriel	Black	15	M	August 21, 1829	Patrick	Rape	Nancy Hill, white	William Branch Giles
Dick	Black		M	August 24, 1829	York	Poisoning	Bray family, white	William Branch Giles
Adam	Black		M	August 26, 1829	Hanover	Murder	William Boyer, white (Note: Adam and Sandy were slaves of Boyer, Davy was a slave of Thomas Jones.)	William Branch Giles
Sandy	Black		M	August 28, 1829	Hanover	Murder	William Boyer, white	William Branch Giles
Davy	Black		M	August 28, 1829	Hanover	Murder	William Boyer, white	William Branch Giles
Alexander	Black		M	October 16, 1829	Bedford	Murder	Floyd, child, white	William Branch Giles
Annis	Black		F	October 21, 1829	Amelia	Attempted murder	Mr. and Mrs. Matthew Allen, white	William Branch Giles
Joseph	Black		M	November 22, 1829	Shenandoah	Rape	Anna Ray, white	William Branch Giles

=== 1830s ===
Name	Race	Age	Sex	Date of execution	County or Independent City	Crime	Victim(s)	Governor
Reuben	Black		M	May 3, 1830	Henry	Murder	Frederick, black	John Floyd
Henry	Black		M	June 25, 1830	Franklin	Attempted rape		John Floyd
Pvt. Wheeler	White		M	July 16, 1830	Chesterfield	Murder	Male, white (Note: Confessed to committing up to 13 previous murders, including that of Capt. McClelland "at the Dock" in January 1829. This murder was of his sergeant at Bellona Arsenal.)	John Floyd
Daniel	Black		M	July 30, 1830	Henrico	Murder	James Drummond, white	John Floyd
John M. Jones	White		M	August 16, 1830	Lynchburg City	Murder	George Hamilton, white	John Floyd
Charles Young	White		M	November 26, 1830	Caroline	Murder	Thomas Griffin Thornton, white	John Floyd
Dick	Black		M	July 29, 1831	Loudoun	Rape	Pleasant Cole, white	John Floyd
Daniel	Black		M	September 5, 1831	Southampton	Slave revolt		John Floyd
Moses	Black		M	September 5, 1831	Southampton	Slave revolt		John Floyd
Davy	Black		M	September 9, 1831	Southampton	Slave revolt		John Floyd
Nat	Black		M	September 9, 1831	Southampton	Slave revolt		John Floyd
Nelson	Black		M	September 9, 1831	Southampton	Slave revolt		John Floyd
Davy	Black		M	September 12, 1831	Southampton	Slave revolt		John Floyd
Jack	Black		M	September 12, 1831	Southampton	Slave revolt		John Floyd
Nathan	Black		M	September 21, 1831	Southampton	Slave revolt		John Floyd
Dred	Black		M	September 21, 1831	Southampton	Slave revolt		John Floyd
Curtis	Black		M	September 21, 1831	Southampton	Slave revolt		John Floyd
Stephen	Black		M	September 21, 1831	Southampton	Slave revolt		John Floyd
Sam	Black		M	September 21, 1831	Southampton	Slave revolt		John Floyd
Hark	Black		M	September 21, 1831	Southampton	Slave revolt		John Floyd
Jack Niles	Black		M	September 23, 1831	Suffolk City	Slave revolt		John Floyd
Ned	Black		M	September 23, 1831	Sussex	Slave revolt		John Floyd
Solomon	Black		M	September 23, 1831	Sussex	Slave revolt		John Floyd
Nicholas	Black		M	September 23, 1831	Sussex	Slave revolt		John Floyd
Booker	Black		M	September 23, 1831	Sussex	Slave revolt		John Floyd
Jarrett	Black		M	October 14, 1831	Spotsylvania	Murder	Rose and Jarrett, adult and child, black	John Floyd
Ned	Black		M	October 21, 1831	Sussex	Slave revolt		John Floyd
Solomon	Black		M	October 21, 1831	Sussex	Slave revolt		John Floyd
Nicholas	Black		M	October 21, 1831	Sussex	Slave revolt		John Floyd
Booker	Black		M	October 21, 1831	Sussex	Slave revolt		John Floyd
Joe	Black		M	October 24, 1831	Southampton	Slave revolt		John Floyd
Lucy	Black		F	October 24, 1831	Southampton	Slave revolt		John Floyd
Dick	Black		M	October 27, 1831	Westmoreland	Rape		John Floyd
Sam	Black		M	November 4, 1831	Southampton	Slave revolt		John Floyd
Nat Turner	Black		M	November 11, 1831	Southampton	Slave revolt		John Floyd
Elleck	Black		M	November 16, 1831	Prince George	Murder	John H. Lewis, white (owner)	John Floyd
Ephraim	Black		M	November 16, 1831	Prince George	Murder	John H. Lewis, white (owner)	John Floyd
Dennis	Black		M	November 16, 1831	Prince George	Murder	John H. Lewis, white (owner)	John Floyd
Anthony	Black		M	November 16, 1831	Prince George	Murder	John H. Lewis, white (owner)	John Floyd
Preston	Black		M	November 16, 1831	Prince George	Murder	John H. Lewis, white (owner)	John Floyd
Ben	Black		M	December 20, 1831	Southampton	Slave revolt		John Floyd
Elizabeth	Black		F	March 9, 1832	Norfolk City	Conspiracy to poison		John Floyd
John	Black		M	May 4, 1832	Richmond	Murder	William Davis, white	John Floyd
Barry Newsome	Black		M	May 11, 1832	Southampton	Sedition	(Note: Free black, supported Nat Turner's rebellion.)	John Floyd
Renah	Black		F	October 5, 1832	Prince Edward	Poisoning	Orford, black	John Floyd
Fanny	Black		F	October 5, 1832	Prince Edward	Poisoning	Orford, black	John Floyd
Joshua	Black		M	November 2, 1832	Prince Edward	Rape		John Floyd
John Tumns	White		M	November 9, 1832	Scott	Murder	John Wright, white	John Floyd
Sam	Black		M	March 22, 1833	Northumberland	Highway robbery		John Floyd
Bob	Black		M	April 19, 1833	Chesterfield	Rape	Catharine Lockett, white	John Floyd
John	Black		M	June 14, 1833	King and Queen	Murder		John Floyd
Ben	Black		M	June 21, 1833	Frederick	Rape	Charlotte Middleton, white	John Floyd
Mary	Black		M	June 21, 1833	Southampton	Attempted murder		John Floyd
Lee	Black		M	October 18, 1833	Albemarle	Murder-Robbery	Peter U. Ware, white	John Floyd
Peter	Black		M	October 18, 1833	Albemarle	Murder-Robbery	Peter U. Ware, white	John Floyd
Sim	Black		M	November 8, 1833	Madison	Murder		John Floyd
Peter	Black		M	July 11, 1834	Grayson	Rape	Eve Haga, white	Littleton Waller Tazewell
Caleb Watts	Black		M	July 18, 1834	Westmoreland	Attempted rape		Littleton Waller Tazewell
Nelly	Black		F	August 1, 1834	Bedford	Murder	Joseph F. Wheat, infant, white	Littleton Waller Tazewell
George	Black		M	August 3, 1834	Prince Edward	Murder	John and Jesse Kirby, white (owners)	Littleton Waller Tazewell
Littleton	Black		M	August 3, 1834	Prince Edward	Murder	John and Jesse Kirby, white (owners)	Littleton Waller Tazewell
Nelson	Black		M	October 31, 1834	Lynchburg City	Murder	Edward Jones, white	Littleton Waller Tazewell
Ben	Black		M	March 6, 1835	Fauquier	Murder	Samuel Woodall, white	Littleton Waller Tazewell
Thomas Jones	White		M	July 3, 1835	Westmoreland	Murder	Female, white (wife)	Littleton Waller Tazewell
Pleasant Gillis	Black		M	July 24, 1835	Petersburg City	Rape	Female, white	Littleton Waller Tazewell
Robert Hoy	White		M	July 24, 1835	Rockingham	Murder	Mrs. Smoot, white	Littleton Waller Tazewell
Ephraim	Black		M	July 31, 1835	Accomack	Highway robbery		Littleton Waller Tazewell
Lewis	Black		M	July 31, 1835	Accomack	Highway robbery		Littleton Waller Tazewell
Spencer	Black		M	July 31, 1835	Accomack	Highway robbery		Littleton Waller Tazewell
Humphrey	Black		M	April 15, 1836	Caroline	Murder	Samuel Kendall, white	Wyndham Robertson
Phoebe	Black		F	May 13, 1836	Essex	Murder	Carter Lumpkin, white (owner)	Wyndham Robertson
Simmons	Black		M	April 7, 1837	Nottoway	Murder	Frederick Fowkes, white (owner)	David Campbell
Frank	Black		M	December 1, 1837	Henrico	Murder	Michael Doddy, white	David Campbell
David	Black		M	December 8, 1837	Pittyslvania	Rape		David Campbell
Jackson Henry	Black		M	December 15, 1837	Fairfax	Rape	Female, white	David Campbell
Orange	Black		M	December 15, 1837	Lunenburg	Attempted murder	John McFarland, white	David Campbell
Jacob Crabtree	White		M	December 29, 1837	Botetourt	Murder	George Blaze, white	David Campbell
William Bennett	White		M	January 19, 1838	Pittsylvania	Murder	Dr. J. H. Echols, white	David Campbell
Randolph	Black		M	July 13, 1838	Louisa	Murder	George Thornley, white (owner)	David Campbell
George	Black		M	September 14, 1838	Powhatan	Murder	James Lovell, white	David Campbell
Andrew	Black		M	September 24, 1838	Bath	Murder	Mary Mayse Deed, child, white (Note: Also murdered her sibling, both children of their owner, George Mayse.)	David Campbell
Lucinda	Black		F	September 24, 1838	Bath	Murder	Mary Mayse Deed, child, white	David Campbell
Jim	Black		M	October 12, 1838	Bedford	Murder	Esther, black	David Campbell
Mehegan	Black		M	November 30, 1838	Suffolk City	Murder	Mr. Bird, white (constable)	David Campbell
Benjamin Puller	Black		M	December 28, 1838	Frederick	Murder	William Brent, white	David Campbell
Frank	Black		M	March 13, 1839	Southampton	Rape	Polly Oney, white	David Campbell
Jeff	Black		M	March 13, 1839	Southampton	Rape	Polly Oney, white	David Campbell
Bob	Black		M	May 3, 1839	Cumberland	Arson	N/A	David Campbell
Henry	Black		M	May 22, 1839	Wythe	Arson	N/A	David Campbell
Henry	Black		M	September 6, 1839	Spotsylvania	Attempted murder	Eldridge Satterwhite, white	David Campbell
Jacob	Black		M	November 8, 1839	Madison	Arson	N/A	David Campbell
Henry Morris	Black		M	December 10, 1839	York	Aggravated assault		David Campbell
Henry	Black		M	December 20, 1839	?	Murder		David Campbell

=== 1840s ===
Name	Race	Age	Sex	Date of execution	County or Independent City	Crime	Victim(s)	Governor
Henry	Black		M	February 18, 1840	Orange	Attempted rape		David Campbell
Spencer	Black		M	May 22, 1840	Fairfax	Insurrection		Thomas Walker Gilmer
Random	Black		M	July 14, 1840	Nottoway	Murder		Thomas Walker Gilmer
Lewis	Black		M	September 11, 1840	Nottoway	Murder		Thomas Walker Gilmer
Betsy	Black		F	September 25, 1840	Fauquier	Murder	John Somerfield Wilson, infant, white	Thomas Walker Gilmer
Anthony	Black		M	October 16, 1840	Lunenburg	Highway robbery		Thomas Walker Gilmer
Nicholas	Black		M	October 20, 1840	Southampton	Insurrection		Thomas Walker Gilmer
Ampey	Black		M	November 27, 1840	Dinwiddie	Rape		Thomas Walker Gilmer
Diana	Black		F	March 1, 1841	Greensville	Attempted poisoning		Thomas Walker Gilmer
Stephen	Black		M	March 12, 1841	Chesterfield	Murder		Thomas Walker Gilmer
John	Black		M	October 1, 1841	Norfolk City	Attempted murder	Rebecca Cooper, white (Note: Also attempted to murder another white woman.)	John Rutherfoord
Captain	Black		M	April 8, 1842	Page	Murder	John W. Bell, white (owner)	John Munford Gregory
Martin	Black		M	April 8, 1842	Page	Murder	John W. Bell, white (owner)	John Munford Gregory
David Lucas	White		M	August 12, 1842	Giles	Murder-Robbery	John Ruff, white	John Munford Gregory
Daniel Wright	Black		M	August 12, 1842	Alleghany	Murder	John Punsinger, white (owner)	John Munford Gregory
Robin	Black		M	September 16, 1842	Northampton	Attempted murder	William Harmonson, white	John Munford Gregory
Ephraim	Black		M	December 23, 1842	Dinwiddie	Arson		John Munford Gregory
Matthew	Black		M	December 23, 1842	Dinwiddie	Arson		John Munford Gregory
Benjamin Stegall	White		M	January 6, 1843	Halifax	Murder		James McDowell
Flemming	Black		M	January 20, 1843	Chesterfield	Murder		James McDowell
Beverly	Black		M	May 19, 1843	Halifax	Rape	Mrs. Phelps, white	James McDowell
Arthur	Black		M	November 10, 1843	Albemarle	Rape		James McDowell
George	Black		M	November 24, 1843	King William	Rape	Elizabeth Quarles, white	James McDowell
Jerry	Black		M	December 22, 1843	Lunenburg	Rape	Eliza Benfield, white	James McDowell
George	Black		M	January 5, 1844	Fluvanna	Murder	Andrew Bruce, white (owner)	James McDowell
Lewis	Black	19	M	February 2, 1844	Cumberland	Rape		James McDowell
Robin	Black		M	March 29, 1844	Pittsylvania	Murder	Female, black (wife)	James McDowell
Willis	Black		M	April 12, 1844	Pulaski	Attempted rape		James McDowell
Andrew	Black		M	August 9, 1844	Albemarle	Rape		James McDowell
John	Black		M	September 27, 1844	Accomack	Rape	Sarah Broadwater, white	James McDowell
Frederick	Black		M	January 15, 1845	Rappahannock	Poisoning	James Green, white (owner)	James McDowell
Jack	Black		M	March 28, 1845	Suffolk City	Attempted rape	Nancy Cutherell, white	James McDowell
Jerry	Black		M	June 20, 1845	Campbell	Attempted murder	Mrs. John A. Mohr, white	James McDowell
Moses Johnson	Black		M	December 19, 1845	Henrico	Murder	Felix Ferguson, white (guard)	James McDowell
George Freeman	Black		M	December 19, 1845	Augusta	Rape	Malvina Whittock, white	James McDowell
Jim	Black		M	December 19, 1845	Augusta	Rape	Malvina Whittock, white	James McDowell
George	Black		M	December 19, 1845	Augusta	Rape	Malvina Whittock, white	James McDowell
John	Black		M	January 31, 1846	Petersburg City	Attempted murder	George L. Taylor, white	William Smith
Moses Henry	Black		M	March 24, 1846	Henrico	Murder	Delia Fisher, black	William Smith
Bob	Black		M	May 7, 1847	Nottoway	Murder		William Smith
Peter	Black		M	May 21, 1847	Goochland	Murder	John Trice, 14, white	William Smith
Posey	Black		M	May 21, 1847	Goochland	Murder	John Trice, 14, white	William Smith
Everett Day	Black		M	June 4, 1847	Chesterfield	Attempted rape	Female, white	William Smith
Daniel	Black		M	July 30, 1847	Halifax	Murder		William Smith
Willis	Black		M	July 30, 1847	Sussex	Murder		William Smith
Giles	Black	20	M	December 10, 1847	Henrico	Murder	Thomas B. Goodman, white (overseer)	William Smith
Billy	Black		M	April 28, 1848	Petersburg City	Murder	John Mingeon, black	William Smith
King	Black		M	May 12, 1848	Henrico	Murder	Moses, black	William Smith
Jefferson	Black		M	July 28, 1848	Wythe	Murder	Reuben, black	William Smith
William	Black		M	September 16, 1848	Gloucester	Murder	James B. Catlett, white	William Smith
Simon	Black		M	October 6, 1848	Prince Edward	Conspiracy to murder	Charles A. Scott, white	William Smith
Simon	Black		M	October 6, 1848	Prince Edward	Conspiracy to murder	Charles A. Scott, white	William Smith
Reuben	Black		M	November 10, 1848	Albemarle	Attempted murder	Dr. Garland A. Garth, white (owner)	William Smith
Neal Lewis (Note: Tried and executed as a free man, but retroactively determined to have actually been a slave in 1855.)	Black		M	December 15, 1848	Loudoun	Murder		William Smith
William Epes	White		M	December 22, 1848	Dinwiddie	Murder-Robbery	Francis Adolphus Muir, white	William Smith
Jim Mays	Black		M	September 28, 1849	Pittsylvania	Murder		John B. Floyd
Eliza	Black		F	October 12, 1849	Brunswick	Poisoning	Noble, infant, white	John B. Floyd
Roberta	Black		F	October 12, 1849	Brunswick	Poisoning	Noble, infant, white	John B. Floyd
Bob	Black		M	October 19, 1849	Halifax	Aggravated assault	Unknown, white	John B. Floyd
Wesley	Black		M	December 28, 1849	Mecklenburg	Rape	Martha Brame, white	John B. Floyd

=== 1850s ===
Name	Race	Age	Sex	Date of execution	County or Independent City	Crime	Victim(s)	Governor
Peter	Black		M	February 8, 1850	Prince George	Arson	N/A	John B. Floyd
Henry	Black		M	April 5, 1850	Southampton	Murder	Thomas H. Artis, white	John B. Floyd
Henry	Black		M	June 25, 1850	Franklin	Attempted rape		John B. Floyd
Henry Gunn	Black		M	June 28, 1850	Henrico	Murder	Richard Whichells, white (owner)	John B. Floyd
Agnes	Black		F	July 19, 1850	Prince William	Murder	Gerard Mason, white (owner)	John B. Floyd
Robert	Black		M	August 16 or 17, 1850	Lancaster	Murder	Victor Snead, white	John B. Floyd
Ben	Black		M	November 29, 1850	Rockbridge	Rape	Female, white	John B. Floyd
Dick	Black		M	March 7, 1851	Mecklenburg	Poisoning		John B. Floyd
Simon	Black		M	October 31, 1851	Grayson	Murder	Samuel Bartlett and John Clements, white	John B. Floyd
Lewis	Black		M	October 31, 1851	Grayson	Murder	Samuel Bartlett and John Clements, white	John B. Floyd
Jack	Black		M	October 31, 1851	Grayson	Murder	Samuel Bartlett and John Clements, white	John B. Floyd
Bickerton	Black		M	December 19, 1851	Louisa	Murder	Robert T. Talley, white	John B. Floyd
Frank	Black		M	December 19, 1851	Louisa	Murder		John B. Floyd
Andrew	Black		M	December 26, 1851	Middlesex	Attempted rape	Female, white	John B. Floyd
Edmund Clore	White		M	March 26, 1852	Madison	Murder	Thomas Carpenter, white	Joseph Johnson
Edward Clements	White		M	April 23, 1852	Henrico (Federal)	Piracy		Joseph Johnson
Thomas Reid	White		M	April 23, 1852	Henrico (Federal)	Piracy		Joseph Johnson
Mahalia	Black		F	May 14, 1852	Giles	Murder	Sally, elderly, black	Joseph Johnson
Molly	Black		F	September 10, 1852	Sussex	Attempted murder	John R. Magee, white	Joseph Johnson
Jane	Black		F	September 10, 1852	Powhatan	Murder	Mrs. Tamzin H. Beasley, white	Joseph Johnson
Jane Williams	Black		F	September 10, 1852	Henrico	Murder	Winston family, white (Note: Their owner, his wife, and their child.)	Joseph Johnson
Jerry	Black		M	September 24, 1852	Page	Aggravated assault	Unknown, white	Joseph Johnson
John Williams	Black		M	October 22, 1852	Henrico	Murder	Winston family, white (Note: Their owner, his wife, and their child.)	Joseph Johnson
Miles	Black		M	November 12, 1852	Virginia Beach City	Rape		Joseph Johnson
Sydney	Black		M	January 7, 1853	Nottoway	Murder	Thomas Dean, white	Joseph Johnson
Andrew	Black		M	June 10, 1853	Charlotte	Rape		Joseph Johnson
John S. Wormley	White		M	June 24, 1853	Chesterfield	Murder	Anthony T. Robiou, white	Joseph Johnson
Tom	Black		M	July 1, 1853	Mecklenburg	Arson	N/A	Joseph Johnson
Margaret Buckner	Black		F	August 12, 1853	Culpeper	Murder	Reuben Gaines, white	Joseph Johnson
Jim Phillips	Black		M	August 12, 1853	Culpeper	Murder	Reuben Gaines, white	Joseph Johnson
Joshua Goings	Black		M	August 12, 1853	Albemarle	Murder	Female, black (daughter)	Joseph Johnson
Buck	Black		M	September 9, 1853	Sussex	Murder	Mr. Birdson, child, white	Joseph Johnson
Harris	Black		M	September 9, 1853	Sussex	Murder	Mr. Birdson, child, white	Joseph Johnson
John	Black		M	September 9, 1853	Sussex	Murder	Mr. Birdson, child, white	Joseph Johnson
Benjamin Smith	Black		M	December 9, 1853	Washington	Rape	Ms. Trent, minor, white	Joseph Johnson
Hemphill Trayer	White		M	January 6, 1854	Augusta	Murder-Robbery	William Coleman, elderly, white	Joseph Johnson
Sally	Black		F	February 17, 1854	Halifax	Murder	Female, black	Joseph Johnson
Jim Gooch	Black		M	March 10, 1854	Rockbridge	Murder	Sam, black	Joseph Johnson
Jack	Black		M	August 22, 1854	Henry	Murder	John Barrow, white	Joseph Johnson
William	Black		M	October 6, 1854	Surry	Rape	Julia Ann Rogers, white	Joseph Johnson
Washington	Black		M	November 17, 1854	Henrico	Arson	N/A	Joseph Johnson
Frank	Black		M	April 27, 1855	Prince Edward	Murder	Violet, black (wife)	Joseph Johnson
Henry	Black		M	June 29, 1855	Buckingham	Murder	Franklin Deane and Thomas Shenault, white	Joseph Johnson
Ned	Black		M	August 31, 1855	Dinwiddie	Murder	Unknown, black	Joseph Johnson
Joe Jones	Black		M	October 26, 1855	Chesterfield	Attempted rape	Ms. Dassonville, white	Joseph Johnson
Jim Jones	Black		M	November 1855	Bedford	Murder	Mr. Woodson, white	Joseph Johnson
John	Black		M	November 16, 1855	Dinwiddie	Murder	Tom, black	Joseph Johnson
George	Black		M	February 1, 1856	Wythe	Aggravated assault	Mrs. Stone, white	Henry A. Wise
Farriss	Black		M	April 11, 1856	Bedford	Murder	Capt. James H. Robinson, white	Henry A. Wise
Jacob	Black		M	April 21, 1856	Charles City	Murder	E. W. Harwood, white	Henry A. Wise
Julius	Black		M	May 28, 1856	Charlotte	Murder	Unknown, black	Henry A. Wise
Anna	Black		F	June 20, 1856	Charles City	Arson		Henry A. Wise
Smith	Black		M	August 1, 1856	Goochland	Murder	Thomas W. Terry, white (Note: Smith was a slave of Terry, and Henry was a slave of John Johnson.)	Henry A. Wise
Henry	Black		M	August 1, 1856	Goochland	Murder	Thomas W. Terry, white	Henry A. Wise
Amelia	Black		F	September 12, 1856	Caroline	Murder	Isabella Atkins, minor, black	Henry A. Wise
Sam	Black		M	September 26, 1856	Highland	Murder	Francis W. Sheridan, white	Henry A. Wise
Jesse	Black		M	October 10, 1856	Buckingham	Rape	Female, 13, white	Henry A. Wise
Anderson	Black		M	November 7, 1856	Spotsylvania	Rape	Female, 12, white	Henry A. Wise
James	Black		M	November 9, 1856	Bedford	Murder	Unknown, black	Henry A. Wise
Nelly	Black	65	F	February 13, 1857	Prince William	Murder	George Green, white (owner)	Henry A. Wise
Betsy	Black	45	F	February 13, 1857	Prince William	Murder	George Green, white (owner)	Henry A. Wise
James	Black	17	M	February 13, 1857	Prince William	Murder	George Green, white (owner)	Henry A. Wise
Arthur	Black	17	M	June 5, 1857	Caroline	Attempted murder	Mrs. John Clift, white	Henry A. Wise
Catharine	Black		F	August 21, 1857	Louisa	Murder	Salena J. Hill, white	Henry A. Wise
Anthony	Black		M	October 23, 1857	Amherst	Attempted murder	John P. Campbell, white	Henry A. Wise
Reuben	Black		M	October 23, 1857	Appomattox	Murder	Tom, black	Henry A. Wise
James Crowley	White		M	November 6, 1857	Caroline	Murder	Mr. Houston, 18, white	Henry A. Wise
Jim	Black		M	November 20, 1857	Suffolk City	Attempted murder	William R. Brothers, white (owner)	Henry A. Wise
Harvey	Black		M	November 20, 1857	Suffolk City	Attempted murder	William R. Brothers, white (owner)	Henry A. Wise
Jenny	Black	30	F	February 26, 1858	Arlington	Murder	Elizabeth Hall, white	Henry A. Wise
Major	Black		M	March 1858	Charles City	Unspecified felony		Henry A. Wise
Henry Bradley	Black		M	March 19, 1858	New Kent	Murder	James C. Grant, white (Note: Henry Bradley was a slave of Grant, Major Morris was a slave of Thomas I. Carter.)	Henry A. Wise
Dick Bradley	Black		M	March 19, 1858	New Kent	Murder	James C. Grant, white	Henry A. Wise
Major Morris	Black		M	March 19, 1858	New Kent	Murder	James C. Grant, white	Henry A. Wise
Jesse Crockett	Black	25	M	April 30, 1858	Stafford	Murder-Robbery	William Griffin, white	Henry A. Wise
B. S. Pate	White		M	June 25, 1858	Scott	Murder	Mr. Lutrell, white	Henry A. Wise
James Catlett	Black		M	August 6, 1858	Frederick	Murder	Sam Brock, elderly, black	Henry A. Wise
Tom Long	Black		M	August 13, 1858	Pittsylvania	Attempted murder	Elisha F. Keen, white	Henry A. Wise
Madison	Black		M	September 3, 1858	Surry	Murder	John W. Watkins, white	Henry A. Wise
Jane	Black		F	September 10, 1858	Bedford	Murder	Christopher Musgrove, white (owner)	Henry A. Wise
Bray Saunders	White		M	January 14, 1859	Southampton	Murder	Female, white (wife)	Henry A. Wise
Henry	Black		M	March 2, 1859	Goochland	Attempted rape		Henry A. Wise
William Brown	White	35	M	March 25, 1859	Alleghany	Murder	Jacob M. Nicely, white	Henry A. Wise
Richard	Black		M	April 19, 1859	Henry	Poisoning	Greenbery B. Nichols, white (owner)	Henry A. Wise
James Johnson	White		M	May 13, 1859	Rappahannock	Murder	Female, white (wife)	Henry A. Wise
Dow	Black		M	May 17, 1859	Henry	Poisoning	Greenbery B. Nichols, white (owner)	Henry A. Wise
Harry	Black		M	May 17, 1859	Henry	Poisoning	Greenbery B. Nichols, white (owner)	Henry A. Wise
Patrick Murphy	White		M	July 1, 1859	Alleghany	Murder	Female, white (wife)	Henry A. Wise
David	Black		M	July 22, 1859	Richmond	Attempted rape	Female, white	Henry A. Wise
Angelina	Black		F	September 30, 1859	Culpeper	Arson	N/A	Henry A. Wise

=== 1860s ===
Note: Executions for military crimes (ex. desertion) during the Civil War, both Union and Confederate, are not listed here.

Name	Race	Age	Sex	Date of execution	County or Independent City	Crime	Victim(s)	Governor
Jim	Black		M	March 2, 1860	Bedford	Murder	Male, white	John Letcher
Henry	Black		M	March 2, 1860	Goochland	Attempted rape		John Letcher
Ann	Black		F	April 6, 1860	Essex	Murder	Dr. William Croxton, white (owner)	John Letcher
Eliza	Black		F	April 6, 1860	Essex	Murder	Dr. William Croxton, white (owner)	John Letcher
Branch	Black		M	May 11, 1860	Nottoway	Murder	Hyram Fowlkes, white	John Letcher
English	Black		M	May 11, 1860	Nottoway	Murder	Hyram Fowlkes, white	John Letcher
Jordan	Black		M	May 18, 1860	Pittsylvania	Murder	Bob, black	John Letcher
Winston	Black		M	May 18, 1860	Greene	Aggravated assault	Male, white (overseer) (Note: The overseer was turned "into a maniac" as a result of his injuries.)	John Letcher
Elisha	Black		M	August 3, 1860	Louisa	Unspecified felony		John Letcher
William Hendricks	White		M	August 31, 1860	Lynchburg City	Murder	Thomas Johnson, white	John Letcher
George	Black		M	August 31, 1860	Halifax	Rape	Mary J. Vaughan, white	John Letcher
Colin	Black		M	November 9, 1860	Lunenburg	Poisoning	Spencer family, white (Note: Dick and John were slaves of M. L. Spencer, Colin was a slave of John A. Johns and implicated due to his wife being a slave of Spencer.)	John Letcher
Dick	Black		M	November 9, 1860	Lunenburg	Poisoning	Spencer family, white	John Letcher
John	Black		M	November 9, 1860	Lunenburg	Poisoning	Spencer family, white	John Letcher
William D. Totty	White	25	M	November 16, 1860	Henrico	Murder	Female, white (sister-in-law)	John Letcher
Nelson	Black		M	January 25, 1861	Caroline	Murder	Unknown, white	John Letcher
Andrew	Black		M	February 28, 1861	Caroline	Arson		John Letcher
Benjamin Lambert	White		M	May 30, 1861	Prince William (Military)	Espionage	N/A	John Letcher
Charles	Black		M	June 29, 1861	Louisa	Aggravated burglary		John Letcher
William Murray	White		M	August 2, 1861	Alexandria City (Military)	Murder	Mary Butler, white	John Letcher
Hiram	Black		M	September 1861	Rockingham	Rape		John Letcher
Mark	Black		M	October 11, 1861	Nottoway	Arson		John Letcher
Harriet	Black		F	November 1861 (Note: Granted a pregnancy respite on June 11, 1861.)	Frederick	Murder	Hetty A. Cooley, white (owner)	John Letcher
Nelson	Black		M	January 1862	Appomattox	Murder		John Letcher
Isaac	Black		M	March 28, 1862	Orange	Murder	Unknown, white	John Letcher
Ben	Black		M	April 18, 1862	Amherst	Rape		John Letcher
Timothy Webster	White	41	M	May 1, 1862	Henrico (Military)	Espionage	N/A	John Letcher
Clara Ann	Black		F	May 23, 1862	Henrico (Note: Crime committed in Culpeper County, transferred to Richmond due to Union advances.)	Murder	Female, white (owner)	John Letcher
John Buck	Black		M	June 20, 1862	Lunenburg	Aggravated assault		John Letcher
John	Black		M	July 15, 1862	Chesterfield	Rape		John Letcher
Martin	Black		M	July 15, 1862	Chesterfield	Rape		John Letcher
Addison	Black		M	July 26, 1862	Dinwiddie	Attempted murder		John Letcher
John Richardson	White	30	M	August 21, 1862	Henrico (Note: Federal death sentence by the Confederate government.)	Counterfeiting	N/A	John Letcher
Charles Mason	White		M	August 22, 1862	Culpeper (Military)	Espionage	N/A	John Letcher
Oscar	Black		M	September 12, 1862	Botetourt	Murder	Mr. Tribbett, white	John Letcher
Bibb	Black		M	September 12, 1862	Sussex	Attempted rape	Alice Spiers, white	John Letcher
Johnson	Black		M	October 10, 1862	Nottoway	Murder		John Letcher
John	Black		M	January 2, 1863	Henrico	Attempted murder		John Letcher
Margaret	Black	20	F	January 9, 1863	Henrico (Note: Crime committed in Oxford, North Carolina, transferred to Richmond by Confederate authorities due to Union advances.)	Murder	Francis Deane Tardy, infant, white	John Letcher
Emanuel	Black		M	January 16, 1863	Lunenburg	Aggravated burglary-Rape	Jane Dodd and Elizabeth Norman, white	John Letcher
Jerry	Black		M	January 23, 1863	Washington	Murder	William McDaniel, white	John Letcher
Jim	Black		M	January 23, 1863	Washington	Murder	William McDaniel, white	John Letcher
Mary Jane	Black		F	February 1863	Hanover	Aggravated assault		John Letcher
William Pace	White		M	February 28, 1863	Caroline (Military)	Espionage	N/A	John Letcher
Herod	Black		M	April 1863	Bedford	Murder	Unknown, black	John Letcher
Alfonso C. Webster	White		M	April 10, 1863	Henrico (Military)	Espionage	N/A	John Letcher
Orris Brown	Black		M	May 15, 1863	Southampton	Arson	N/A	John Letcher
Morgan	Black		M	May 22, 1863	Petersburg City	Arson		John Letcher
Richard	Black		M	May 29, 1863	Henrico (Note: Crime committed in King William County, transferred to Richmond due to Union advances.)	Aggravated assault	Male, white (overseer)	John Letcher
Alsie	Black		F	June 1863	Craig	Attempted murder	Male, white	John Letcher
Henry	Black		M	June 26, 1863	Patrick	Burglary		John Letcher
Armstead	Black		M	July 1, 1863	Amherst	Murder	General Dillard, white (owner)	John Letcher
Bet	Black		F	July 1, 1863	Amherst	Murder	General Dillard, white (owner)	John Letcher
George	Black		M	July 1, 1863	Amherst	Murder	General Dillard, white (owner)	John Letcher
Jane	Black		F	July 1, 1863	Amherst	Murder	General Dillard, white (owner)	John Letcher
Sarah	Black		F	July 1, 1863	Amherst	Murder	General Dillard, white (owner)	John Letcher
Seaton	Black		M	July 1, 1863	Amherst	Murder	General Dillard, white (owner)	John Letcher
Miles	Black		M	July 31, 1863	Amelia	Aggravated assault	J. B. Littlepage, white (owner)	John Letcher
James Stover	White		M	August 14, 1863	Roanoke	Murder-Robbery	John Peyton, white	John Letcher
Charles	Black		M	September 11, 1863	Powhatan	Murder	Robert R. Williams, white (owner)	John Letcher
Jaque	Black		M	September 11, 1863	Powhatan	Murder	Robert R. Williams, white (owner)	John Letcher
Joe	Black		M	September 11, 1863	Powhatan	Murder	Robert R. Williams, white (owner)	John Letcher
Landon	Black		M	September 11, 1863	Powhatan	Murder	Robert R. Williams, white (owner)	John Letcher
David Wright	White		M	October 23, 1863	Norfolk City (Military)	Murder	Lt. A. L. Sanborn, white	John Letcher
William Abraham	White		M	March 7, 1864 (Note: Executed by firing squad.)	York (Military)	Espionage	N/A	William Smith
Emma	Black	16	F	March 11, 1864	Botetourt	Poisoning	Fannie Lewis and Ada Wood, white	William Smith
David Creigh	White		M	June 13, 1864	Rockbridge (Military) (Note: Crime committed in Greenbrier County, now part of West Virginia.)	Murder	Male, white	William Smith
Fed	Black		M	August 26, 1864	Mecklenburg	Insurrection		William Smith
Agnes	Black		F	September 23, 1864	Dinwiddie	Aggravated burglary		William Smith
Henry	Black		M	October 7, 1864	Henrico	Arson (Note: Set a haystack on fire, most likely sentenced to death because he set the fire to attempt to lure a white man, William Day, "into a deadly trap.")	N/A	William Smith
William	Black		M	October 21, 1864	Henrico	Burglary (Note: Robbed the storehouse of James T. Butler & Co., stealing "a large consignment of boots and shoes.")	N/A	William Smith
Ben	Black		M	October 21, 1864	Henrico	Burglary	N/A	William Smith
Nat	Black		M	December 30, 1864	Pittsylvania	Rape		William Smith
Tom	Black		M	January 6, 1865	Bedford	Attempted murder	Male, white (owner)	William Smith
Charles King	White	26	M	January 6, 1865 (Note: Executed by firing squad.)	Frederick (Military)	Espionage	N/A	William Smith
Henry Regley	White	27	M	January 6, 1865	Frederick (Military)	Espionage	N/A	William Smith
Bob	Black		M	February 10, 1865	Nottoway	Insurrection		William Smith
Claiborne	Black		M	March 17, 1865	Franklin	Rape	Female, white	William Smith
Gilley	Black		M	March 24, 1865	Petersburg City	Attempted rape-Robbery	Female, white	William Smith
Marcellus	Black		M	April 21, 1865	Lynchburg City	Burglary		William Smith
Sam	Black		M	April 21, 1865	Lynchburg City	Burglary		William Smith
Thomas Shields	White	28	M	April 20, 1866	Henrico (Military) (Note: Crime committed in James City County.)	Murder-Robbery	Andrew Taylor, white	Francis Harrison Pierpont
Isaac Chaney	Black	31	M	July 16, 1866	Henrico (Military) (Note: Crime committed in Rockbridge County.)	Murder	Richard (ex-owner) and Elizabeth A. Gerald, 53 and 55, white	Francis Harrison Pierpont
Harrison Flood	Black		M	October 26, 1866	Buckingham	Murder	James Sudsbury, 36, white	Francis Harrison Pierpont
Glenroy Baker	Black	19	M	November 16, 1866	Spotsylvania	Murder-Robbery	Judson A. Motley, 23, white	Francis Harrison Pierpont
Solomon Stamper	Black	18	M	November 24, 1866	Grayson	Rape (Note: "Carnal knowledge of a Minor.")	Emma Bland, 9, white	Francis Harrison Pierpont
Caesar Wooldridge	Black		M	December 7, 1866	Chesterfield	Rape	Mary Cogbill, 14, white	Francis Harrison Pierpont
John G. Robertson	White	24	M	December 28, 1866	Stafford	Murder-Burglary	Gustavus and Nancy Limerick, both 50+, white	Francis Harrison Pierpont
Benjamin Harden	White	22	M	June 28, 1867	Tazewell	Murder-Robbery	Dennis T. Burnes, 55, white	Francis Harrison Pierpont
Isaac Yarborough	Black	24	M	November 1, 1867	Lunenburg	Murder-Robbery	Samuel S. Rowlett, 20, white	Francis Harrison Pierpont
Thomas H. Laurence	White		M	January 10, 1868	Pittsylvania	Murder	Lucy A. Prewitt, 42, white	Francis Harrison Pierpont
Abel Anthony	Black		M	July 24, 1868	Northampton	Rape	Female, white	Henry H. Wells
Harrison Young	Black	35	M	August 25, 1868	Newport News City	Murder-Robbery	John Wootten, 31, white	Henry H. Wells
John Perkins	White	36	M	October 9, 1868	Portsmouth City	Rape	Sarah Elizabeth Ford, 27, white	Henry H. Wells
Adam Franklin	Black	44	M	May 28, 1869	Appomattox	Murder	Haxall Johnson, 59, black	Henry H. Wells
Albert Taylor	Black	30	M	May 29, 1869	Henrico	Murder	Paulina Hubbard, black	Henry H. Wells
Peter Riddick	Black	41	M	July 23, 1869	Chesapeake City	Murder-Robbery	Cornelius Hays, 28, white	Henry H. Wells

=== 1870s ===
Name	Race	Age	Sex	Date of execution	County or Independent City	Crime	Victim(s)	Governor
Alexander Gardiner	Black	35	M	February 11, 1870	New Kent	Murder-Rape-Burglary	John Baker and Julia Hookady Stewart, 54 and 31, black and white	Gilbert Carlton Walker
Spencer Wright	Black		M	June 3, 1870	Northampton	Murder-Robbery	Joshua P. Wescoat, 52, white	Gilbert Carlton Walker
William Taylor	Black		M	June 17, 1870	King George	Murder-Robbery	Willie H. Jett, 16, white	Gilbert Carlton Walker
Lewis Kennedy	Black	25	M	July 1, 1870	New Kent	Murder-Rape-Burglary	John Baker and Julia Hookady Stewart, 54 and 31, black and white	Gilbert Carlton Walker
James Phillips	White	27	M	July 22, 1870	Henrico	Murder	Mary Emily Pitts Phillips, 30, white (wife)	Gilbert Carlton Walker
John Walkabout	Black		M	August 5, 1870	Accomack	Murder	Ayres Latham, 46, white	Gilbert Carlton Walker
York Campbell	Black	25	M	August 5, 1870	Culpeper	Murder	Pollux Patrick, 60+, black	Gilbert Carlton Walker
Warner Taylor	Black		M	August 12, 1870	King George	Murder-Robbery	Willie H. Jett, 16, white	Gilbert Carlton Walker
Henry East	Black	20	M	September 16, 1870	Isle of Wight	Murder-Robbery	Josiah P. Gray, 67, white	Gilbert Carlton Walker
Peter Lawrence	Black	35	M	September 16, 1870	Isle of Wight	Murder-Robbery	Josiah P. Gray, 67, white	Gilbert Carlton Walker
Moses Newby	Black	27	M	September 16, 1870	Isle of Wight	Murder-Robbery	Josiah P. Gray, 67, white	Gilbert Carlton Walker
Jacob Wallace	Black	18	M	September 16, 1870	Isle of Wight	Murder-Robbery	Josiah P. Gray, 67, white	Gilbert Carlton Walker
Archer Hines	Mixed	26	M	October 7, 1870	Prince Edward	Murder	Anderson Fowlkes, 35, black	Gilbert Carlton Walker
Kit Hubbard	Black	32	M	November 25, 1870	Pittsylvania	Murder-Robbery	Joseph E. Anderson, 62, white	Gilbert Carlton Walker
John Jackson	Black	27	M	February 24, 1871	Pittsylvania	Murder-Robbery	Joseph E. Anderson, 62, white	Gilbert Carlton Walker
Thomas McGriffin	White	22	M	July 21, 1871	Greensville (Note: Change of venue from Brunswick County.)	Murder	John B. Drummond, 70, white (sheriff's constable)	Gilbert Carlton Walker
Richard Green	Black	28	M	July 28, 1871	Prince George	Murder-Robbery	Charles Friend, 53, white	Gilbert Carlton Walker
William Henry	Black	27	M	July 28, 1871	Prince George	Murder-Robbery	Charles Friend, 53, white	Gilbert Carlton Walker
Jacob Brock	Black	45	M	December 8, 1871	Louisa	Murder	Judy Brock, 31, black (wife)	Gilbert Carlton Walker
Charles Manley	Black		M	March 28, 1873	Alexandria City	Murder-Robbery	John Monroe, 60, white	Gilbert Carlton Walker
Archie Johnson	Black		M	June 13, 1873	Russell	Murder	John Hurt, 33, white	Gilbert Carlton Walker
Jim Brown	Black	21	M	July 11, 1873	Suffolk City	Murder	Elizabeth Jones and Sarah Dozier, 47 and 59, white	Gilbert Carlton Walker
William Jackson	Black	40	M	August 15, 1873	Alexandria City	Murder	Mary Fletcher, 27, black (wife)	Gilbert Carlton Walker
Edward Brown	Black	35	M	June 12, 1874	Culpeper	Murder-Robbery	William C. Durkin, 23, white	James L. Kemper
John Diggs	Black	34	M	November 13, 1874	Nelson	Murder	Mariah Diggs, black (wife)	James L. Kemper
Lewis Adams	Black	64	M	January 8, 1875	Pittsylvania	Murder	Rice Wilson, 31, black	James L. Kemper
Jesse Fowlkes	Black	18	M	March 19, 1875	Prince William	Murder-Burglary	Jeremiah and Gina Herndon, 70 and 65, white (Note: Former slave of Jeremiah Herndon. Also murdered their houseboy, Addison Russell (18, black).)	James L. Kemper
Joe Clarke	Black	29	M	April 30, 1875	Pittsylvania	Murder	Albert Barksdale, 28, black	James L. Kemper
Thomas Withers	Black	15	M	August 13, 1875	Lynchburg City	Murder	Agnes Thomas, 60, black	James L. Kemper
Isaac Griffin	Black	28	M	March 2, 1876	Norfolk City	Rape	Idavilla Brown Griffin, 25, black (sister-in-law) (Note: Serial rapist, also raped two black women (Adeline Bell and Violet Stone) and attempted to rape a white woman (Mrs. Dr. West).)	James L. Kemper
Hillary Page	Black	17	M	September 1, 1876	Chesterfield	Arson (Note: Serial arsonist, burned numerous buildings starting in 1874.)	N/A	James L. Kemper
Cornelius Coggins	Black	30	M	September 29, 1876	Campbell	Murder	Hattie Coggins, 26, black (wife)	James L. Kemper
Jack Pleasants	Black	51	M	June 8, 1877	Dinwiddie	Murder	Ann Lundy, black	James L. Kemper
Andrew Shifflett	White	29	M	September 25, 1877	Rockingham	Murder	David G. Lawson, 37, white	James L. Kemper
Frank Smith	Black		M	November 9, 1877	Virginia Beach City	Rape	Anne Lovitt, 14, black (Note: Serial rapist, also raped Martha J. Gentry (11, black).)	James L. Kemper
Henry Williams	Black		M	February 22, 1878	Isle of Wight	Rape	Margaret Ann Stephens, child, white	Frederick W. M. Holliday
John Robinson	Black	25	M	May 31, 1878	Caroline	Murder	Eliza Roy, 18, black (love interest)	Frederick W. M. Holliday
Julius Christian	Black	21	M	March 25, 1879	New Kent	Murder-Robbery	John Calvin Lacy, 43, white	Frederick W. M. Holliday
Patrick Smith	Black	20	M	March 25, 1879	New Kent	Murder-Robbery	John Calvin Lacy, 43, white	Frederick W. M. Holliday
Winter Payne	Black	38	M	July 11, 1879 (Note: First private executions.)	Fauquier	Murder	James Adams, 50, black	Frederick W. M. Holliday
John Williams	Black	35	M	July 11, 1879	Fauquier	Murder-Robbery	Howard Holtzclaw, 20, white	Frederick W. M. Holliday
Frank Baker	Black	22	M	December 19, 1879	Sussex	Murder	Agnes and Sarah Shands, 25 years and 18 months, black	Frederick W. M. Holliday
John Dean	White	45	M	December 19, 1879	Scott	Murder	Henry E. Fugate, 25, white	Frederick W. M. Holliday

=== 1880s ===
Name	Race	Age	Sex	Date of execution	County or Independent City	Crime	Victim(s)	Governor
General Webb	White	48	M	January 9, 1880	Carroll	Murder-Robbery	Joshua Nester, 86, white (father-in-law)	Frederick W. M. Holliday
Samuel Robinson	Black	28	M	April 9, 1880	Loudoun	Murder	Edward Thomas, 56, black	Frederick W. M. Holliday
Charles Bolling	Black	17	M	May 28, 1880	Hanover	Rape (Note: "C. K. of a Minor.")	Phelia Gathright, 8, white	Frederick W. M. Holliday
Peter Wright	Black	57	M	October 29, 1880	Bedford	Murder	Robert M. Maupin, 13, white	Frederick W. M. Holliday
Albert Mitchell	Black	23	M	November 5, 1880	Louisa	Murder-Robbery	Charles K. Walton, 33, white	Frederick W. M. Holliday
Marcus Hawley	White	29	M	November 26, 1880	Roanoke	Murder	Zachariah Hays, 29, white	Frederick W. M. Holliday
Lucinda Fowlkes	Black	35	F	April 22, 1881	Lunenburg	Murder	Wilson Fowlkes, 50, black (husband)	Frederick W. M. Holliday
Dock Wright	Black	18	M	March 31, 1882	Pittsylvania	Murder	J. Coleman Arthur, 32, white	William E. Cameron
Armistead Gray	Black	40	M	June 9, 1882	Powhatan	Murder	Abraham Lincoln Gray, 10, black (son)	William E. Cameron
Walter Yates	White	26	M	August 4, 1882	Pittsylvania	Murder-Robbery	Presley Edward Atkinson, 24, white	William E. Cameron
Charles Beaver	Black	16	M	March 30, 1883	Loudoun	Rape	Annie Hunt, 10, white	William E. Cameron
Louis Carter	Black		M	June 22, 1883	Southampton	Murder	Fanny Carter, black (wife)	William E. Cameron
Charles Lee	Black	21	M	August 3, 1883	Henrico	Murder	Daniel Miller, 37, black (Barbara's husband)	William E. Cameron
Barbara Miller	Black	28	F	September 14, 1883	Henrico	Accessory to murder	Daniel Miller, 37, black (Barbara's husband)	William E. Cameron
Isaac Evans	Black	18	M	September 28, 1883	Pittsylvania	Murder-Robbery	William F. Shappard, 40, white	William E. Cameron
Reuben King	Black	20	M	September 28, 1883	Pittsylvania	Murder-Robbery	William F. Shappard, 40, white	William E. Cameron
Sawney Younger	Black	20	M	September 28, 1883	Pittsylvania	Murder-Robbery	William F. Shappard, 40, white	William E. Cameron
John Jarvis	White	50	M	January 11, 1884	Virginia Beach City	Murder	Claudius W. Bonney, 38, white	William E. Cameron
Abraham Russell	White	30	M	May 9, 1884	Lee	Murder	Ira Dean, 59, white (father-in-law)	William E. Cameron
George Gibson	White	26	M	February 6, 1885	Scott	Murder-Robbery	William E. Gibson, 28, white	William E. Cameron
Wayne Powers	White	24	M	February 6, 1885	Scott	Murder-Robbery	William E. Gibson, 28, white	William E. Cameron
Joe Barbour	Black	68	M	June 18, 1885	Albemarle	Murder	Randall Jackson, 28, black	William E. Cameron
Horace Terrell	Black	27	M	June 18, 1885	Albemarle	Murder-Rape	Mary Foster, 11, black	William E. Cameron
Jacob Butler	Black	32	M	November 20, 1885	York	Murder	James Griffin, 45, black	William E. Cameron
Wes Honesty	Black	24	M	June 4, 1886	Frederick	Murder	Joseph C. McFaul, 19, white	Fitzhugh Lee
Tably Banks	Black	22	M	June 4, 1886	Frederick	Murder	Joseph C. McFaul, 19, white	Fitzhugh Lee
Thomas Cluverius	White	24	M	January 14, 1887	Henrico	Murder	Fannie Lillian Madison, 22, white (girlfriend)	Fitzhugh Lee
Holmes Puryear	White	26	M	August 12, 1887	Prince George (Note: Change of venue from Dinwiddie County.)	Murder	Emma Webb Puryear, 27, white (wife)	Fitzhugh Lee
William Finchum	White	29	M	December 30, 1887	Rockingham	Murder	Presley Finchum, 32, white (brother)	Fitzhugh Lee
John C. Johnston	Black	35	M	January 6, 1889	Richmond	Rape	Alice Wilson, white	Fitzhugh Lee
John Pritchett	Black	30	M	March 29, 1889	Pittsylvania	Rape	Jennie R. Pollock, 8, white	Fitzhugh Lee
Walter Harris	Black	18	M	May 3, 1889	Greensville	Murder-Robbery	Albert Parham, 35, black	Fitzhugh Lee
Robert Williams	Black	19	M	May 3, 1889	Greensville	Murder	Emerson Mason, 37, black	Fitzhugh Lee
Henry Albert Coleman	Black	31	M	May 31, 1889	Chesapeake City	Murder-Robbery	James Grant, 60+, white	Fitzhugh Lee
Paul Key	Black	33	M	October 4, 1889	Fredericksburg City	Rape	Alice Ballard, 5, white	Fitzhugh Lee

=== 1890s ===
Name	Race	Age	Sex	Date of execution	County or Independent City	Crime	Victim(s)	Governor
Thomas Wilson	Black	25	M	July 25, 1890	Henry	Murder	Jim Davis, black	Philip W. McKinney
John Phillips	Black	35	M	August 15, 1890	Mecklenburg	Murder	Robert Camillus Overby, 52, white (Note: Previously arraigned for another murder in South Carolina but released on a legal technicality.)	Philip W. McKinney
George Early	Black	44	M	August 22, 1890	Franklin	Arson (Note: Convicted of starting a fire that destroyed 22 buildings in Rocky Mount.)	N/A	Philip W. McKinney
Bird Woods	Black	26	M	August 22, 1890	Franklin	Arson	N/A	Philip W. McKinney
William Jordan	Black	18	M	April 21, 1891	Charlottesville City	Murder	George Thomas Seal, 37, white (police officer)	Philip W. McKinney
James B. Craney	Black	24	M	April 24, 1891	Rockbridge	Murder	Charles Oliver, 16, black	Philip W. McKinney
Walter Johnson	Black		M	May 23, 1891	Petersburg City (Note: Change of venue from Nottoway County.)	Rape	Elizabeth Majors, white	Philip W. McKinney
Randall Watson	Black	33	M	July 10, 1891	Greensville	Murder	Joseph Robinson, 27, black	Philip W. McKinney
Henrietta Murrell	Black	41	F	September 28, 1891	Charlotte	Murder	Rice children (two), black	Philip W. McKinney
Robert Jordan	Black	25	M	October 23, 1891	Hampton City	Rape	Martha E. Moore, 23, white (Note: Rendered a "lifetime invalid" from her injuries and died of "acute phithisis" (general weakening) in 1894.)	Philip W. McKinney
William Henry Custis	Black	30	M	November 10, 1891	Chesapeake City	Murder-Burglary	Tanus L. Waller, 64, white	Philip W. McKinney
Henry Nolan	Black	19	M	November 20, 1891	Botetourt	Murder	Mr. Mosca, white	Philip W. McKinney
Charles Watkins	Black	28	M	January 8, 1892	Roanoke	Murder	Susan Watkins, 37, black (wife)	Philip W. McKinney
Margaret Hashley	Black	22	F	January 22, 1892	Danville City	Accessory to murder	George Hashley, 40+, black (Margaret's husband)	Philip W. McKinney
James Lyles	Black	24	M	January 22, 1892	Danville City	Murder	George Hashley, 40+, black (Margaret's husband)	Philip W. McKinney
George Gaines	Black	26	M	May 27, 1892	Essex	Murder	Percy Carlton, 20, white	Philip W. McKinney
Talton Hall	White	40	M	September 2, 1892	Wise	Murder	Enos B. Hylton, 37, white (Newton constable) (Note: Suspected, but not convicted, of murdering the man whose wife he later married. Hylton was this man's brother-in-law.)	Philip W. McKinney
Bill Davis	Black		M	September 9, 1892	Tazewell	Murder	Charles Jones, black (police officer)	Philip W. McKinney
John Royster	Black	50	M	February 9, 1893	Suffolk City	Murder	John P. Eppes, 25, white	Philip W. McKinney
Silas Nash	Black	22	M	February 24, 1893	Buckingham	Murder	Charles Nash, 57, black (father)	Philip W. McKinney
George Drier	White	30	M	June 16, 1893	Northampton	Murder-Burglary	Fanny McFadden, 70, white	Philip W. McKinney
Marshall W. Taylor	White	58	M	October 27, 1893	Wise	Murder-Robbery	Five people, white (Note: Ira Mullins (35), his wife Louranza Estep (31), his brother John Wilson Mullins (36), and John Chappell and Greenbury Harris,)	Philip W. McKinney
William Foreman	Black	24	M	November 24, 1893	Portsmouth City	Murder	Carrie Carrington, 22, black	Philip W. McKinney
Jim Robinson	Black	20	M	April 27, 1894	Prince William	Rape	Elizabeth Elliott Hefflin and Mrs. Elliott, 45 and 20, white	Charles Triplett O'Ferrall
Benjamin White	Black	20	M	April 27, 1894	Prince William	Rape	Elizabeth Elliott Hefflin and Mrs. Elliott, 45 and 20, white	Charles Triplett O'Ferrall
Lawrence Spiller	Black	46	M	June 8, 1894	Augusta	Murder-Rape	Lettie Rowe, 14, white	Charles Triplett O'Ferrall
Madison Brown	Black	16	M	July 31, 1894	Norfolk City	Murder-Burglary	John Dollard, 52, white	Charles Triplett O'Ferrall
William G. Taylor	White	49	M	August 17, 1894	Pulaski	Murder	Nancy Taylor, 42, white (wife)	Charles Triplett O'Ferrall
Moses Christopher	Black	19	M	November 14, 1894	Caroline	Rape	Moselle Carter, 7, white	Charles Triplett O'Ferrall
William Robertson	White	21	M	January 25, 1895	Franklin	Murder-Robbery	Jerry Barbour, 68, white	Charles Triplett O'Ferrall
Sam Marshall	Black		M	March 1, 1895	Lee	Murder	Joshua Ingle, 24, white	Charles Triplett O'Ferrall
Thornton Parker	Black	21	M	April 19, 1895	Frederick	Rape	Mary V. Melton, 19, white	Charles Triplett O'Ferrall
Morris Hopkins	Black	20	M	April 24, 1895	Henrico	Murder	Henry S. Parsons, 48, white	Charles Triplett O'Ferrall
Philip Nicholas	White	48	M	July 25, 1895	Henrico	Murder	William J. Wilkerson and James Mills, 44 (Mills), white	Charles Triplett O'Ferrall
James Harris	Black	22	M	August 23, 1895	King and Queen	Attempted rape	Emma B. Fleet, 6, white	Charles Triplett O'Ferrall
Kit Leftwich	Black	25	M	October 11, 1895	Bristol City	Rape	Annie Fogarty, 13, white (Note: Fugitive from Bedford County for another rape at the time of this crime.)	Charles Triplett O'Ferrall
Robert Ridley	Black	31	M	October 18, 1895	Sussex	Murder	William S. Williams, 48, white	Charles Triplett O'Ferrall
Ed Hubbard	Black	21	M	November 1, 1895	Halifax	Murder	Isaac Calland, 21, black	Charles Triplett O'Ferrall
John Weatherman	White	38	M	February 14, 1896	Carroll	Murder	Rachel Malinda Rorer Weatherman, 40, white (wife)	Charles Triplett O'Ferrall
John Johnson	Black	19	M	June 12, 1896	Lancaster	Murder-Robbery	Charles L. Carter, 20, white	Charles Triplett O'Ferrall
Henry Magruder	Black	37	M	June 19, 1896	Alleghany	Attempted rape	Nancy Putnam Ballinger, 22, white (Note: Also attempted another rape, assaulted and murdered Ellen Wallace (14, black), and attempted to murder a man within the same 2 hour period as this crime.)	Charles Triplett O'Ferrall
Taylor Harmon	Black	45	M	June 27, 1896	Albemarle	Murder-Robbery	Thomas W. Thompson, 23, white	Charles Triplett O'Ferrall
Solomon Marable	Black	25	M	July 3, 1896	Prince Edward	Murder	Lucy Jane Fowlkes Pollard, 50, white	Charles Triplett O'Ferrall
America Snodgrass	White	18	F	July 10, 1896	Wise	Murder (Note: Last woman to be executed for the infanticide of her own child in the United States.)	Unknown, 6 months, mixed (child) (Note: Mulatto.)	Charles Triplett O'Ferrall
Harry Chapman	Black	21	M	August 7, 1896	Culpeper	Murder	Henry Pendleton, 62, black	Charles Triplett O'Ferrall
William Downing	Black	22	M	January 5, 1897	Norfolk City	Murder	Emma Lane, 22, black	Charles Triplett O'Ferrall
Charles Williams	Black	21	M	January 5, 1897	Norfolk City	Murder-Robbery	George Bess, 25, black	Charles Triplett O'Ferrall
James Lewis	Black	24	M	June 4, 1897	Halifax	Rape	Ida Reidel, 62, white (Note: Serial rapist, confessed to raping three other women before his execution: Lucy Meade (17, black), Edmonia Gardner (18, black), and a 25-year-old white female.)	Charles Triplett O'Ferrall
Joseph Fife	Black	19	M	August 26, 1897	Henrico	Attempted rape	Nina Russell and Mary Griffith Marks, 27, white	Charles Triplett O'Ferrall
Edward Hankins	White	52	M	November 11, 1897	Pittsylvania	Murder	Dr. John Roy Cabell, 74, white	Charles Triplett O'Ferrall
John Hardin	White	22	M	December 17, 1897	Buchanan	Murder	George Mounts, 35, white	Charles Triplett O'Ferrall
Peter Coleman	Black		M	December 24, 1897	Hanover	Murder	Louvisa White, 29, black	Charles Triplett O'Ferrall
Archie Lockley	Black	31	M	January 14, 1898	King and Queen	Murder	Three people, black (Note: Ellen Banks Chapman (67), Eddie Chapman (12), and George Lee (8).)	James Hoge Tyler
James Eskins	Black		M	May 18, 1898	Fauquier	Attempted rape	Barbara S. Waggler, 10, white	James Hoge Tyler
Isaac Paylor	Black	23	M	May 20, 1898	Mecklenburg	Murder	Della Paylor, black (wife)	James Hoge Tyler
Anthony Mayfield	Black	51	M	September 16, 1898	Sussex	Murder	Etta Wells (wife) and Robert Harris, 43 and 48, black	James Hoge Tyler
Joseph Terrell	Black	19	M	September 23, 1898	Albemarle	Murder	Malinda Brown, 41, black (mother-in-law)	James Hoge Tyler
Robert Morton	Black	24	M	November 4, 1898	Petersburg City	Murder	George H. Westmoreland, 24, white	James Hoge Tyler
John Andersen	White	43	M	December 9, 1898	Norfolk City (Federal)	Murder-Mutiny	John W. Whitman, 44, white (captain of Oliver Pecker) (Note: Murdered in the Atlantic Ocean off the coast of Brazil, en route from the River Platte to Boston. Also shot the first mate, William Wallace Saunders (39, white) and ordered the other crew to throw him overboard while still alive.)	James Hoge Tyler
Jordan Webb	Black	25	M	December 9, 1898	Southampton	Rape	Lucy Bowden, 65, white (Note: Her husband Billie (70, white) died from shock shortly afterwards.)	James Hoge Tyler
Arthur Lovitt	Black	19	M	December 16, 1898	Virginia Beach City	Murder	Malachi J. Beasley, 40, white (special constable)	James Hoge Tyler
John Hancock	Black	18	M	December 30, 1898	Lynchburg City	Rape	Rosa Cohn, 11, white (Note: Serial rapist, assaulted two other girls.)	James Hoge Tyler
James Webster	Black	18	M	January 6, 1899	Bedford	Rape	Mary Aunspaugh, 71, white	James Hoge Tyler
George W. Hite	White	65	M	January 23, 1899	Mecklenburg	Murder	William Bowers, 66, black	James Hoge Tyler
Noah Finley	Black	25	M	September 15, 1899	Pulaski	Highway robbery (Note: Also attempted to murder the victim.)	James H. Darst 61, white	James Hoge Tyler

=== 1900s ===
Name	Race	Age	Sex	Date of execution	County or Independent City	Crime	Victim(s)	Governor
Junius Robinson	Black	21	M	January 2, 1900	Dinwiddie	Murder	William M. Jolly, 27, white	James Hoge Tyler
Reuben Griggs	Black	17	M	March 23, 1900	Cumberland	Rape	Martha Hatcher, 6, black	James Hoge Tyler
Charles Hairston	Black	20	M	June 20, 1900	Henry	Attempted rape	Susan Jane Gauldin, 18, white	James Hoge Tyler
Stephen Baptist	Black	18	M	July 10, 1900	Mecklenburg	Murder-Robbery	Peter Jones, 79, white	James Hoge Tyler
Grant Reed	Black	36	M	August 4, 1900	Madison	Murder	Minnie Jackson Reed and Peter Jackson, 26 and 54, black (wife and father-in-law)	James Hoge Tyler
William Woodson	Black	38	M	December 13, 1900 (Note: Only hanging to take place at the state penitentiary.)	Richmond City	Murder	Ambrose Ferrebee, 23, black (cellmate)	James Hoge Tyler
John Holden	Black	20	M	December 21, 1900	Accomack	Attempted rape	Virginia Clayton, 10, white (Note: Serial rapist, confessed to several similar crimes before his execution.)	James Hoge Tyler
Sylvester Griffin	Black	22	M	December 28, 1900	Danville City	Murder	Georgia King, 22, black	James Hoge Tyler
Archie Hunt	Black	23	M	January 25, 1901	Lynchburg City	Murder	Thomas Gills, 38, black	James Hoge Tyler
Edward Payne	Black	20	M	July 12, 1901	Pulaski	Attempted rape	Cynthia Duncan, 18, white	James Hoge Tyler
John Fugate	Black	21	M	August 23, 1901	Wise	Murder	Martha Wells, 26, black (girlfriend)	James Hoge Tyler
Cicero Harris	Black	46	M	December 20, 1901	Bristol City	Murder	Samuel Ware, 33, black	James Hoge Tyler
Joe Higginbotham	Black	20	M	February 24, 1902	Lynchburg City	Rape (Note: Also attempted to murder the victim.)	Bertha Webber, 21, white	Andrew Jackson Montague
Neal Stanback	Black	18	M	March 12, 1902	Portsmouth City	Attempted rape	Elizabeth H. Preufer, 60, white	Andrew Jackson Montague
George Robinson	Black	35	M	August 1, 1902	Wise	Murder	Thomas Bates, 24, black (brother-in-law)	Andrew Jackson Montague
George Easter	Black	49	M	August 22, 1902	Greensville	Murder	Thomas Woodruff, 67, white	Andrew Jackson Montague
Robert Foy	Black	24	M	August 29, 1902	Wise	Murder	Dayton H. Miller, 28, white	Andrew Jackson Montague
John Lomax	Black	18	M	September 9, 1902	Westmoreland	Attempted rape	Susie Costenbader, 15, white	Andrew Jackson Montague
Burrell Johnson	Black	17	M	September 23, 1902	New Kent	Attempted rape	Addie Clow, 25, white	Andrew Jackson Montague
John Hicks	White	47	M	October 3, 1902	Louisa	Murder	Milton Bourne, 25, white (son-in-law)	Andrew Jackson Montague
John Evans	Black	32	M	October 24, 1902	Brunswick	Murder	Harriet Evans, 27, black (wife)	Andrew Jackson Montague
Jerry Kimbrough	Black	23	M	December 22, 1902	Hanover	Attempted rape	Muriel Taylor, 22, white (Note: Taylor was pregnant at the time of the crime.)	Andrew Jackson Montague
Jack Brown	Black	26	M	January 2, 1903 (Note: Hanged at the state prison farm.)	Goochland	Murder	James H. Parker, 30, black (inmate)	Andrew Jackson Montague
Ernest Davis	Black	29	M	January 9, 1903	Chesterfield	Murder	John Henry Stokes, 53, black	Andrew Jackson Montague
William Treadwell	Black	27	M	January 16, 1903	Portsmouth City	Murder	Sarah Treadwell, 25, black (wife)	Andrew Jackson Montague
Arthur Wilton	Black	20	M	February 6, 1903	Danville City	Murder	Jake Lee, 50+, black	Andrew Jackson Montague
Alex Spencer	Black	18	M	April 10, 1903	Halifax	Murder-Rape	Sallie A. Wilborn, 47, white	Andrew Jackson Montague
Samuel Waters	Black		M	April 23, 1903	Norfolk City	Murder-Robbery	Unidentified male, white (Note: Name possibly Charles R. Hunter or T. H. Allen.)	Andrew Jackson Montague
Evans A. Hopson	White	34	M	June 12, 1903	Wise	Murder-Burglary	John Salyers, 46, white	Andrew Jackson Montague
Anderson Finch	Black	18	M	September 2, 1903	Mecklenburg	Attempted rape	Fannie W. Geohegan, 29, white	Andrew Jackson Montague
Julian Warren	Black	35	M	September 4, 1903	Southampton	Murder	Allen Wilson, 31, black	Andrew Jackson Montague
Sherman Stevens	Black		M	September 25, 1903	Roanoke City	Murder	Male, black (father)	Andrew Jackson Montague
Clifton Branham	White	40	M	September 25, 1903	Wise	Murder	Nancy J. Branham, 40, white (wife) (Note: Previously murdered Harry Vanover in Letcher County, Kentucky and was sentenced to life in prison in 1887, but was pardoned 15 years later. Also confessed to the murder of Anderson Moore (51, white) in Floyd County, Kentucky.)	Andrew Jackson Montague
Doc Bacon	Black		M	October 3, 1903	Mecklenburg	Attempted rape	Fannie W. Geohegan, 29, white	Andrew Jackson Montague
Will Jones	Black		M	October 9, 1903	Danville City	Murder-Robbery	Jake Lee, 50+, black (Note: Confessed to murdering a freight brakeman in Clifton Forge, a man in the suburbs of Charlotte, North Carolina, and an unidentified man found dead near Danville; denied murdering Jake Lee.)	Andrew Jackson Montague
Robert Gleeson	Black	55	M	December 30, 1903	Amherst	Murder	James C. Reed, 33, white	Andrew Jackson Montague
Frank Bradley	Black	22	M	January 30, 1904	Nelson	Murder-Robbery	William P. Harris, 44, white	Andrew Jackson Montague
Parker Robinson	Black	27	M	March 4, 1904	Brunswick	Murder	Sarah Robinson, 58, black (mother)	Andrew Jackson Montague
John Clements	Black		M	March 11, 1904	King William	Murder	George W. Hobaugh, 42, white	Andrew Jackson Montague
Henry Williams	Black	29	M	March 18, 1904	Roanoke City	Rape	Alice Shields, 21, white (Note: Confessed to murdering two other women in Ohio and Pennsylvania respectively as well as attacking numerous women. Alice's daughter Mildred (2) was severely injured during the crime and subsequently died.)	Andrew Jackson Montague
Chesley Peoples	White	47	M	March 25, 1904	Wythe	Murder	John Seagle, 29, white (Note: Possible serial killer, suspected in three other murders.)	Andrew Jackson Montague
Henry Woodward	Black		M	May 6, 1904	Tazewell	Murder	Frank Tabor, 28, white	Andrew Jackson Montague
Leonard Clark	Black	20	M	May 27, 1904	Amherst	Murder-Robbery	Lloyd Morris, 20, black	Andrew Jackson Montague
James Caul	Black	21	M	September 17, 1904	Nelson	Murder	Sallie Thompson, 20, black (love interest)	Andrew Jackson Montague
James Bailey	Black	18	M	September 26, 1904	Southampton	Murder	Cadmus Williams, 19, black	Andrew Jackson Montague
John H. Banks	Black	22	M	September 30, 1904	Buckingham	Murder	John J. Brown, 74, black	Andrew Jackson Montague
James Goode	Black	28	M	January 6, 1905	Richmond City	Murder	John F. Shinberger, 63, white (police inspector) (Note: Murdered Shinberger while he was attempting to arrest Goode for murdering Richard Fox (black).)	Andrew Jackson Montague
Benjamin Lipkin	Black	57	M	January 27, 1905	Clarke	Murder	Richard Ellerson, 33, black	Andrew Jackson Montague
J. Samuel McCue	White	46	M	February 10, 1905	Charlottesville City	Murder	Frances Crawford McCue, 33, white (wife)	Andrew Jackson Montague
Edwin Austin	Black	20	M	March 16, 1905	Richmond City	Rape	Lillie Ross, 8, black	Andrew Jackson Montague
Peter Dancy	Black	35	M	March 16, 1905	Richmond City	Murder	Inez Ledbetter, black	Andrew Jackson Montague
Robert Bowles	Black		M	March 17, 1905	Alleghany	Murder	John A. Ruff, white	Andrew Jackson Montague
James Linkous	White	55	M	March 17, 1905	Radford City	Murder	Virginia Cundiff Linkous, 48, white (wife) (Note: Also convicted of murdering their adopted son, Willie Vaughn Linkous (7); denied committing either murder.)	Andrew Jackson Montague
Robert Turner	Black	35	M	March 24, 1905	Washington	Murder	Lou Jefferson, 29, black (girlfriend)	Andrew Jackson Montague
Cloyd Hale	Black	51	M	May 12, 1905	Pulaski	Murder	John Hart, white	Andrew Jackson Montague
William Hansboro	Black	32	M	June 15, 1905	Bath	Murder	James R. McKeen, white	Andrew Jackson Montague
Charles Dean	Black		M	September 13, 1905	Craig	Murder	Fletcher Hawkins, black	Andrew Jackson Montague
Winston Gaines	Black	33	M	November 22, 1905	Charles City	Murder	Laura Ennis, 80, black	Andrew Jackson Montague
Cephas Poindexter	Black		M	November 24, 1905	Franklin	Murder	Zachary Taylor Wade, 56, white (U.S. deputy marshal)	Andrew Jackson Montague
Morris Cremeans	White	42	M	April 6, 1906	Giles	Murder	George A. Kidd, 60+, white (Note: Serial killer, confessed to four other murders.)	Claude A. Swanson
Robert Booker	Black	32	M	May 18, 1906	Prince Edward	Murder	Charles Brown, 27, black	Claude A. Swanson
Gabriel Battaile	Black	16	M	June 8, 1906	King George	Rape	Lena Rogers, 16, white	Claude A. Swanson
Ben Hubbard	Black		M	June 28, 1906	Alleghany	Murder	Robert Brown, black	Claude A. Swanson
Andrew Davenport	Black	31	M	July 13, 1906	Newport News City	Murder	William Thomas, black	Claude A. Swanson
Thomas Jones	Black	25	M	July 13, 1906	Grayson	Murder	Wiley Jones, 45, black (Jones' father)	Claude A. Swanson
Charles Woodruff	Black	29	M	July 13, 1906	Grayson	Accessory to murder	Wiley Jones, 45, black (Jones' father)	Claude A. Swanson
William Wilshire	White	22	M	August 3, 1906	Rockbridge	Murder	Henry J. Smith, white	Claude A. Swanson
Sim Bagby	Black	16	M	September 28, 1906	Middlesex	Attempted rape	Cora Stanley, 22, white	Claude A. Swanson
James Ward	Black	30	M	January 18, 1907	Richmond City	Murder	Carrie Meekins, 19, black (girlfriend)	Claude A. Swanson
Massie Hill	Black	22	M	February 15, 1907	Prince Edward	Murder-Burglary	John E. Grubb, 78, white (postmaster)	Claude A. Swanson
William Ruffin	Black	38	M	February 15, 1907	Prince Edward	Murder-Burglary	John E. Grubb, 78, white (postmaster)	Claude A. Swanson
Arthur Davis	Black	20	M	March 8, 1907	Surry	Murder-Robbery	J. F. Saleby, Syrian	Claude A. Swanson
Peter Good	White	25	M	March 22, 1907	Page	Murder	Fannie Stroop, 22, white (girlfriend)	Claude A. Swanson
James King	Black	19	M	June 7, 1907	Giles	Murder	Charles B. Early, 43, white	Claude A. Swanson
John Hardy	Black	34	M	June 14, 1907	Roanoke City	Murder	Robert M. Beard, 52, white (police officer)	Claude A. Swanson
Frank Allen	Black		M	August 22, 1907	Mecklenburg	Attempted rape	Ella Ellis Callis, 21, white	Claude A. Swanson
William McIntosh	Black		M	September 5, 1907	Norfolk City	Murder-Robbery	Charles W. Parks, 48, white (Note: Also murdered Miles Newby (40, black) during the same crime.)	Claude A. Swanson
William Harris	Black	22	M	October 18, 1907	Chesterfield	Attempted rape	Lena Rowland, 18, white	Claude A. Swanson
George Peters	White	35	M	October 18, 1907	Carroll	Murder	Rev. Joseph Easter, 49, white	Claude A. Swanson
John Taylor	Black	18	M	November 22, 1907	Caroline	Murder	Jenifer Coleman, 20, black (cousin)	Claude A. Swanson
John Gillison	Black	32	M	November 29, 1907	Madison	Murder	Pearl Thomas Gillison, black (wife)	Claude A. Swanson
Thomas Johnson	Black		M	December 13, 1907	King William	Murder-Robbery	Chapman P. Snead, 57, white	Claude A. Swanson
Noah Fulton	White	19	M	December 13, 1907	Washington	Murder	John Johnson, 21, white	Claude A. Swanson
George Midgets	Black		M	February 14, 1908	Alexandria City	Murder-Robbery	Charles T. Smith, 36, white (Note: Confessed to murdering a Romani man, Joseph Smith, in Pennsylvania; denied killing Charles Smith.)	Claude A. Swanson
Walter Rippey	Black	27	M	March 27, 1908	Tazewell	Rape	Mary Dancey, 26, white (Note: Serial rapist, also raped a 14-year-old white girl and three black girls.)	Claude A. Swanson
Grant Goode	Black	16	M	April 3, 1908	Brunswick	Murder	Samuel Rivers, 24, black	Claude A. Swanson
Leo Thurman	White	25	M	April 10, 1908	Norfolk City	Murder-Robbery	Walter P. Dolsen, 21, white	Claude A. Swanson
Daniel Jackson	Black	37	M	April 24, 1908	Greensville	Murder	Lizzie Jackson, 30, black (wife)	Claude A. Swanson
Lee Strother	Black	22	M	September 11, 1908	Madison	Attempted rape	Leola Frye, 26, white (Note: Confessed to an earlier similar crime before his execution.)	Claude A. Swanson
Joel Payne	Black	31	M	April 9, 1909	Bedford	Murder	Reed Swain, 54, black (father-in-law)	Claude A. Swanson

== Electrocution ==
On March 6, 1908, the state senate passed a house bill replacing local hangings with centralized electrocution at the state penitentiary. The state's final hanging took place on April 9, 1909, when Joel Payne, a black man, was hanged for the murder of his father-in-law Reed Swain in Bedford. However, William Turner was hanged in Henrico County on June 24, 1921, for a federal murder conviction as hanging was mandatory for all federal executions at the time. Virginia was the first Southern state to switch from hanging to electrocution.

Name	Race	Age	Sex	Date of execution	County or Independent City	Crime	Victim(s)	Governor
Henry Smith	Black	22	M	October 13, 1908	Portsmouth City	Rape	Catherine Powell, 78, white	Claude A. Swanson
Winston Green	Black	17	M	October 30, 1908	Chesterfield	Attempted rape	Alice Larsen, 13, white	Claude A. Swanson
Frank Davenport	Black	23	M	January 4, 1909	Norfolk City	Murder	John Taylor, 25, black	Claude A. Swanson
Charles Gillespie	Black	24	M	February 18, 1909	Henrico	Attempted rape-Robbery	Marie Louise Stumpf, 19, white	Claude A. Swanson
Benjamin Gilbert	White	19	M	March 19, 1909	Norfolk City	Murder	Amanda B. Morse, 21, white (love interest)	Claude A. Swanson
Aurelius Christian	Black	17	M	March 22, 1909	Botetourt	Murder-Rape	Mary Dobbs, 14, white	Claude A. Swanson
James Smith	Black	24	M	April 8, 1909	Henrico	Murder-Robbery	James Flynn, 65, white	Claude A. Swanson
Harry Seaborne	Black	22	M	April 16, 1909	Greensville	Rape	Rebecca Turner, 33, black	Claude A. Swanson
John Brown	Black	57	M	April 30, 1909	Powhatan	Murder-Burglary	Mary Bolling Skipwith and Walter G. Johnson, 72 and 38, white	Claude A. Swanson
William Brown	Black	33	M	April 30, 1909	Powhatan	Murder-Burglary	Mary Bolling Skipwith and Walter G. Johnson, 72 and 38, white	Claude A. Swanson
Isham Taylor	Black	32	M	May 5, 1909	Powhatan	Murder-Burglary	Mary Bolling Skipwith and Walter G. Johnson, 72 and 38, white	Claude A. Swanson
Joe Taylor	Black	34	M	May 5, 1909	Powhatan	Murder-Burglary	Mary Bolling Skipwith and Walter G. Johnson, 72 and 38, white	Claude A. Swanson
Lewis Jenkins	Black	40	M	May 7, 1909	Powhatan	Murder-Burglary	Mary Bolling Skipwith and Walter G. Johnson, 72 and 38, white	Claude A. Swanson
John Flemming	Black	27	M	July 30, 1909	Lunenburg	Murder	Rosa Flemming, black (wife)	Claude A. Swanson
William H. Wise	Black	29	M	August 27, 1909	Petersburg City	Murder-Robbery	Thomas Walker, black	Claude A. Swanson
Howard Bragg	White	24	M	September 24, 1909	Rockbridge	Murder-Robbery	Thomas E. Drawbond, 50, white (brother-in-law)	Claude A. Swanson
Jack Traynham	Black	24	M	November 12, 1909	Lynchburg City	Murder	Edgar Turner, 30, black	Claude A. Swanson
Harry Robinson	Black	23	M	December 9, 1909	Warren	Murder	William Larkin Sealock, 46, white	Claude A. Swanson
Clifton Breckenridge	Black	20	M	December 17, 1909	Staunton City	Attempted rape	Dorothy Powell, 6, white	Claude A. Swanson
Thurman Spinner	Black	18	M	January 14, 1910	Bedford	Murder	Charles W. Noell, 19, white	Claude A. Swanson
W. P. Parker	Black	25	M	January 25, 1910	Norfolk City	Murder	Samuel Fisher, black	Claude A. Swanson
William Goins	Black	38	M	January 28, 1910	Roanoke	Murder	Thomas Walker, black	Claude A. Swanson
Howard Little	White	38	M	February 11, 1910	Buchanan	Murder-Robbery	Six people, white (Note: Elizabeth Baker Justus (66), her son-in-law George Meadows (24), his wife Lydia (21, Elizabeth's daughter), and their three children Will (8), Noah (5), and Lafayette (2). Previously given a life sentence (and pardoned) for the murder of Jacob Kinney (20, white) in Pike County, Kentucky.)	William Hodges Mann
Willie Blake	Black	23	M	February 11, 1910	Norfolk City	Rape	Alice Jernigan, 60, white	William Hodges Mann
Elijah Rouse	Black	28	M	April 25, 1910	Norfolk City	Murder	Benjamin Taylor, black	William Hodges Mann
Henry Smith	Black	45	M	June 3, 1910	Alexandria City	Murder-Robbery	Walter F. Schultz, 35, white	William Hodges Mann
Thomas Noel	Black	25	M	June 10, 1910	Norfolk City	Murder	Joseph W. Sykes, 41, white (deputy sheriff)	William Hodges Mann
Angelo Hamilton	White	27	M	July 1, 1910	Lynchburg City	Murder	Sallie B. Hicks, 23, white (girlfriend)	William Hodges Mann
Arch Brown	White	32	M	September 22, 1910	Augusta	Murder	William Peter Hoy and Cletus Higgs, 23 and 8, white	William Hodges Mann
Pink Barbour	Black	22	M	September 23, 1910	Rockbridge	Murder-Robbery	James M. Lee, 59, white	William Hodges Mann
John Eccles	Black	17	M	November 11, 1910	Henry	Murder	Sidney Woods, black	William Hodges Mann
Waverly Coles	Black	20	M	November 25, 1910	Henrico	Murder	Edward Fuller, black	William Hodges Mann
John Smyth	White	34	M	December 16, 1910	Norfolk City	Murder	Beatrice and Rita A. Smyth, 29 and 12, white (wife and daughter)	William Hodges Mann
Harry Sitlington	Black	17	M	December 16, 1910	Rockbridge	Murder	Fannie Brown, 62, white	William Hodges Mann
Richard Biggs	Black	28	M	January 7, 1911	Newport News City	Murder	Annie Davis, 25, black (love interest)	William Hodges Mann
Alex Holloman	Black	24	M	June 2, 1911	Virginia Beach City	Murder	Martha Holloman and her child, 20 and <1, black (wife and child)	William Hodges Mann
Henry Beattie Jr.	White	26	M	November 24, 1911	Chesterfield	Murder	Louise Owen Beattie, 21, white (wife)	William Hodges Mann
John Williamson	Black	20	M	March 15, 1912	Halifax	Murder	Ellis Watkins, 28, black	William Hodges Mann
William Price	Black	19	M	June 14, 1912	Chesterfield	Murder	General Thomas Belcher, 47, white (guard)	William Hodges Mann
John Furby	Black	19	M	June 14, 1912	Chesterfield	Murder	General Thomas Belcher, 47, white (guard)	William Hodges Mann
Byrd Jackson	Black	18	M	June 21, 1912	Caroline	Robbery (Note: Also attempted to murder the victim. Jackson beat him in the head with a brick and then an iron bar, after which he slit his mouth with a knife, cut off one of his ears, and left him for dead. The victim was conscious during the entire attack.)	Jacob L. Farmer, 42, white	William Hodges Mann
Clarence Nixon	Black	24	M	June 21, 1912	Norfolk City	Attempted rape	Lizzie Skiles, 36, white	William Hodges Mann
Virginia Christian	Black	17 (Note: Last female juvenile offender to be executed in the United States.)	F	August 16, 1912	Hampton City	Murder-Robbery	Ida E. Belote, 51, white	William Hodges Mann
Herbert Peyton	Black	20	M	November 8, 1912	King George	Murder	Caroline Jackson, 23, black	William Hodges Mann
Richard Quarles	Black	29	M	January 3, 1913	Hanover	Rape-Robbery	Myrtle Rouse, 16, white (Note: Also charged with the attempted rape of Maggie Robinson, white.)	William Hodges Mann
Roy Sullivan	White	32	M	February 28, 1913	Pittsylvania	Murder	John C. Howard, 24, white (guard)	William Hodges Mann
Floyd Allen	White	56	M	March 28, 1913	Wythe (Note: Change of venue from Carroll County.)	Murder	William McDonald Foster, 57, white (state attorney) (Note: Also murdered judge Thornton Lemmon Massie (45), sheriff Lewis Franklin Webb (64), juror Augustus Cezar Fowler (55), and spectator Nancy Elizabeth Ayers (18) during the crime.)	William Hodges Mann
Claude Allen	White	23	M	March 28, 1913	Wythe	Murder	William McDonald Foster, 57, white (state attorney)	William Hodges Mann
James Goode	Black	28	M	May 2, 1913	Newport News City	Murder-Robbery	Julius Smith, 24, white	William Hodges Mann
Alfred Wright	Black	21	M	May 16, 1913	Appomattox	Rape	Bertha Ferguson, 31, white	William Hodges Mann
F. L. Hargrove	Black	39	M	June 20, 1913	Spotsylvania	Murder	Mansfield and Melvina Thornton, 40 and 41, black	William Hodges Mann
Owen Goggin	Black	36	M	June 27, 1913	Bedford	Attempted rape	Elizabeth M. Nance, 32, white	William Hodges Mann
Nelson Carter	White	47	M	June 27, 1913	Spotsylvania	Murder	Hattie B. Carter, 33, white (wife)	William Hodges Mann
Benjamin Bailey	Black	21	M	August 8, 1913	Fairfax	Rape	Helen Mary Follin, 6, white	William Hodges Mann
William Glenn	Black	26	M	August 16, 1913	Norfolk City	Murder	Rosa Pitts, 20, black (girlfriend) (Note: Also killed Elijah Hackett, black, at a woman's home in Greenwood, South Carolina, later killing Pitts while a fugitive.)	William Hodges Mann
Minnie Collins	Black	20	M	October 31, 1913	Northampton	Attempted rape	Sarah B. Gayle, 15, white	William Hodges Mann
Lee Archer	Black	22	M	December 5, 1913	Virginia Beach City	Rape	Cora Whitehurst, 15, white	William Hodges Mann
Newell Walker	White	29	M	December 5, 1913	Charles City	Murder	Mary L. Walker, 25, white (wife)	William Hodges Mann
Charlton Moore	Black	54	M	January 16, 1914	King William	Murder	Hannah Hill Moore, 45, black (wife)	Henry Carter Stuart
Willie Rhodes	Black	27	M	January 30, 1914	Charlotte	Murder	Sam Morton, 79, black	Henry Carter Stuart
Marion Lee	Black	30	M	March 19, 1914	Williamsburg City	Murder	Delaware Brown, 38, black	Henry Carter Stuart
Walter Boyd	Black	24	M	March 27, 1914	Henrico	Murder	Benjamin Franklin, 30, black	Henry Carter Stuart
George Woods	Black	32	M	May 22, 1914	Danville City	Murder	Mariah Woods, 32, black (wife)	Henry Carter Stuart
Will Calloway	Black	48	M	July 10, 1914	Lee	Murder	"Little Boy" Mason, 5, black (nephew)	Henry Carter Stuart
Willie Puryear	Black	19	M	August 7, 1914	Mecklenberg	Attempted rape	Cora Z. Hite, 32, white	Henry Carter Stuart
Henry Coach	Black	33	M	August 21, 1914	Nottoway	Highway Robbery (Note: Also assaulted the victim, who later died from his injuries.)	Alexander Murdock, 62, white	Henry Carter Stuart
John Edmunds	Black	27	M	December 18, 1914	Prince Edward	Murder	Henry Morton, 49, black	Henry Carter Stuart
Arthur Neale	Black	19	M	January 8, 1915	King William	Attempted rape-Robbery	Annie Vitalish, minor, white	Henry Carter Stuart
Charles Miller	Black	29	M	March 26, 1915	Halifax	Murder	John Fountain, black	Henry Carter Stuart
Herbert Caple	Black	24	M	April 30, 1915	Sussex	Highway robbery (Note: Also convicted of assault for beating victim with a rock.)	Joseph M. Fuller, 54, white	Henry Carter Stuart
Skipwith Sydner	Black	25	M	May 21, 1915	Halifax	Murder	Charlie H. Saddle, 80, black	Henry Carter Stuart
Thomas Cole	Black	22	M	June 4, 1915	Mecklenberg	Rape	Georgia Royster, 15, white (Note: Also indicted for the murder of his girlfriend Babe Chandler in Mecklenburg County.)	Henry Carter Stuart
Lem Jones	Black	19	M	June 10, 1915	Norfolk City	Murder-Robbery	Isaac Aleck, 22, Syrian	Henry Carter Stuart
Luther Canter	White	24	M	June 11, 1915	Washington	Murder-Rape	Maude C. Wilson, 27, white	Henry Carter Stuart
George Matthews	Black	32	M	August 20, 1915	Caroline	Rape	Burnley V. and Eulalia Coleman, 49 and 28, white	Henry Carter Stuart
John Rollins	Black	31	M	August 20, 1915	Caroline	Rape	Burnley V. and Eulalia Coleman, 49 and 28, white	Henry Carter Stuart
Ed Pryor	Black	27	M	September 10, 1915	Surry	Highway robbery (Note: Also attempted to murder the victim by hacking him with a meat cleaver and left him for dead.)	Cecil Clyde Pitman, 16, white	Henry Carter Stuart
Sherman Stanfield	Black	18	M	September 17, 1915	Pittsylvania	Attempted rape	Elizabeth Collie, 6, white	Henry Carter Stuart
Percy Ellis	Black	16	M	March 15, 1916	Norfolk City	Murder	Nathan Cohen, 37, white	Henry Carter Stuart
Joe Lee	Black	83	M	April 21, 1916	Caroline	Murder	Jack Grymes, 41, black	Henry Carter Stuart
John Williams	Black	23	M	May 28, 1916	Nottoway	Rape	Mamie Mason, 15, white	Henry Carter Stuart
Milton Mallory	Black	25	M	July 7, 1916	Wise	Rape	Myra Jenkins, 9, white (Note: Serial rapist, also raped five other white girls, aged 5 to 11 years, over several weeks using drugged candy.)	Henry Carter Stuart
Clifford Mickens	Black	19	M	August 25, 1916	Roanoke City	Murder	J. Harvey Leverett, 22, white (police officer)	Henry Carter Stuart
Richard Green	Black	19	M	August 25, 1916	Charlotte	Murder	Gabriel Jones, 11, black	Henry Carter Stuart
Henry Lewis	Black	23	M	September 8, 1916	Lynchburg City	Murder	Mary Willie Crawford, 22, black	Henry Carter Stuart
James Corbett	Black	22	M	October 2, 1916	Norfolk City	Murder	Ernest C. Manning, 32, white	Henry Carter Stuart
Mincie Harris	Black	19	M	October 2, 1916	Buckingham	Rape	Lucretia Branch, 60+, white	Henry Carter Stuart
Hansom Warren	Black	23	M	June 15, 1917	Isle of Wight	Murder	Thomas Jefferson Seward, 35, white	Henry Carter Stuart
Robert Jones	Black	32	M	June 20, 1917	Charlottesville City	Murder	Meredith A. Thomas, 41, white (police officer)	Henry Carter Stuart
Hamilton Cosby	Black	25	M	June 20, 1917	Charlottesville City	Murder	Meredith A. Thomas, 41, white (police officer)	Henry Carter Stuart
Albert Barrett	Black	35	M	August 31, 1917	Charlotte	Murder	William Thomas Roach, 34, white	Henry Carter Stuart
William Burgess	Black	29	M	October 26, 1917	Fairfax	Attempted rape	Mildred Miller, 23, white (Note: Also attacked Mary Davis (17, white) the same day.)	Henry Carter Stuart
Paul Langhorne	Black	39	M	June 7, 1918	Newport News City	Murder	Dorothy Jones, 14, black (stepdaughter)	Westmoreland Davis
Tolson Bailey	Black	17	M	July 2, 1918	Norfolk City	Murder-Robbery	George Frederick Dashiell, 37, white	Westmoreland Davis
Guy Nixon	Black	19	M	July 2, 1918	Norfolk City	Murder-Robbery	George Frederick Dashiell, 37, white	Westmoreland Davis
Horace Williams	Black	21	M	March 26, 1919	Culpeper	Murder-Robbery	Orlando T. Clark, 50, white	Westmoreland Davis
Harvey Stuart	Black	36	M	March 26, 1919	Buena Vista City	Murder	Matt Ross and Monica Evelyn Le Flett, 22 and 21, black	Westmoreland Davis
Jerry Warren	Black	29	M	June 27, 1919	Northampton	Murder	James A. Taylor, 62, white (police officer)	Westmoreland Davis
Emper Jacobs	Black	29	M	October 30, 1919	Portsmouth City	Murder	John Turk, 21, white	Westmoreland Davis
Robert Williams	Black	23	M	November 13, 1920	Lynchburg City	Rape	Annie Ross, 20, white	Westmoreland Davis
John Williams	Black	27	M	March 5, 1921	Lynchburg City	Murder	Leslie Arthur Mann, 38, white (police officer) (Note: Previously killed police detectives Alfred M. Blair and Joseph L. Kitchen (42 and 44, white) in Greenville, South Carolina and was a fugitive at the time of this crime.)	Westmoreland Davis
Giles Sydnor	Black	23	M	April 8, 1921	Halifax	Rape	Lottie V. Cunningham, 24, black	Westmoreland Davis
William Turner	Black	50	M	June 24, 1921 (Note: Executed by hanging at the Henrico County Jail due to federal jurisdiction.)	Henrico (Federal) (Note: Crime committed in Alexandria County (now Arlington County).)	Murder-Robbery	Thomas Morgan Moore, 35, white (Note: Also assaulted Moore's fiancee, Pearl Clark (25, white), during the same crime and was given a capital conviction for this under state jurisdiction.)	Westmoreland Davis
Judge Griffith	Black	22	M	September 30, 1921	Dinwiddie	Murder-Robbery	Stephen G. White, 58, white (Harpers Home postmaster)	Westmoreland Davis
Raleigh Haskins	Black	18	M	September 30, 1921	Dinwiddie	Murder-Robbery	Stephen G. White, 58, white (Harpers Home postmaster)	Westmoreland Davis
Wilmer Hadley	White	39	M	December 9, 1921	Henrico	Murder	Sue Kathleen Tinsley Hadley, 28, white (wife)	Westmoreland Davis
Harry Hart	Black	23	M	January 23, 1922	Augusta	Attempted rape	Virginia Garber, 17, white	Westmoreland Davis
Edmond Thompson	Black	23	M	February 7, 1922	Botetourt	Murder	William Peck Austin, 18, white	Elbert Lee Trinkle
Henry Lockett	Black	34	M	February 23, 1922	Albemarle	Murder-Robbery	Cornelius V. Ward, 37, white	Elbert Lee Trinkle
Thomas Sparks	Black	26	M	February 24, 1922	Albemarle	Murder-Robbery	Cornelius V. Ward, 37, white	Elbert Lee Trinkle
Will Elmore	Black	29	M	March 31, 1922	Henrico (Note: Change of venue from Brunswick County.)	Murder-Robbery	Wilbur Tingley Elmore, 41, white (Tobacco postmaster)	Elbert Lee Trinkle
Henry Barnes	Black	32	M	April 4, 1922	Orange	Murder	Walter E. Snow, 35, white (guard)	Elbert Lee Trinkle
Ernest Brown	Black	20	M	May 26, 1922	Orange	Murder	Walter E. Snow, 35, white (guard)	Elbert Lee Trinkle
Willie Clayton	Black	23	M	January 5, 1923	Henrico	Murder	Three people, black (Note: 21-year-old wife Gertrude Brown Clayton, 44-year-old father-in-law Albert Brown, and 37-year-old aunt Melinda Carter.)	Elbert Lee Trinkle
Alvin Harris	Black	22	M	February 6, 1923	Prince William	Murder	Thomas Semms Meredith, 64, white (Justice of the Peace)	Elbert Lee Trinkle
George Wriggins	Black	31	M	March 2, 1923	Petersburg City	Murder	Alice Wiggins, 30, black (wife)	Elbert Lee Trinkle
Sam Riddick	Black	32	M	June 25, 1923	Newport News City	Murder	Mary Ralls Simmons, 47, black	Elbert Lee Trinkle
Robert Corbett	Black	35	M	September 28, 1923	Roanoke City	Murder	Virgie Martin Griggs, 25, black (girlfriend)	Elbert Lee Trinkle
Otto Clear	Black	18	M	September 12, 1924	Caroline	Murder-Burglary	Thomas Richard Campbell, 68, white	Elbert Lee Trinkle
Fritz Lewis	Black	17	M	September 12, 1924	Caroline	Murder-Burglary	Thomas Richard Campbell, 68, white	Elbert Lee Trinkle
Isaac Cooper	Black	39	M	March 6, 1925	Roanoke	Murder	Australia Wiley, 17, black (stepdaughter)	Elbert Lee Trinkle
Prince Dandridge	Black	33	M	March 12, 1925	Henrico	Murder	Mary Ross Dandridge, 25, black (wife)	Elbert Lee Trinkle
Jesse Carter	Black	30	M	April 17, 1925	Prince Edward	Rape	Ethel Thornton, 16, white	Elbert Lee Trinkle
Percy Lee	Black	34	M	May 1, 1925	Henrico	Attempted rape-Robbery	Elizabeth Hudson, 20, white (Note: Serial rapist, also attacked another white woman and three black women. Fugitive from Louisiana, where he had escaped prison after serving part of a prison term there for attempted rape.)	Elbert Lee Trinkle
Rodney Hoke	White	19	M	July 10, 1925	Alleghany	Murder-Robbery	"Old Man" Brown, 60+, white (Note: Also the main suspect in the disappearance of Brown's son, Robert A. Brown.)	Elbert Lee Trinkle
Horace Allen	Black	45	M	July 17, 1925	Isle of Wight	Murder-Robbery	Sam T. Saunders, 49, white	Elbert Lee Trinkle
Henry Perman	Black	28	M	September 29, 1925	Norfolk City	Attempted rape	Female, 19, white	Elbert Lee Trinkle
Doc Earl McMillan	Black	31	M	October 9, 1925	Norfolk City	Murder-Robbery	Harold W. Gregory, 21, white	Elbert Lee Trinkle
William Spencer	Black	28	M	January 22, 1926	Lee	Murder-Rape	Maxine Kinser, 13, white	Elbert Lee Trinkle
Rudolph Disse	White	20	M	February 19, 1926	Henrico	Murder	Three people, white (Note: 39-year-old police detective Harvey J. Burke, 19-year-old Vivian Tomlin Peers, and 18-year-old Henry Grady Carter.)	Harry F. Byrd
Louis Watkins	Black	28	M	March 19, 1926	Henrico	Murder	Louis Bertucci, 38, white (detective sergeant)	Harry F. Byrd
James Patterson	Black	37	M	August 27, 1926	Petersburg City	Murder-Robbery	Irving Seid, 33, white	Harry F. Byrd
James Satchell	Black	25	M	September 25, 1926	Northampton	Murder	Arletta Belote, 24, black (love interest)	Harry F. Byrd
William Gee	Black	21	M	January 14, 1927	Newport News City	Rape	Female, 67, white	Harry F. Byrd
William Thomas	Black	23	M	April 15, 1927	Madison	Attempted rape	Dora Hudson Clore, 22, white	Harry F. Byrd
Henry Perfey	Black	21	M	April 15, 1927	Norfolk City	Murder-Robbery	Goldie L. Curling, 47, white	Harry F. Byrd
Louis Boersig	White	44	M	July 7, 1927	Fairfax	Murder-Burglary	Loretta and Kathleen Ridgeway, 9 and 6, white	Harry F. Byrd
William Nelson	Black	25	M	November 25, 1927	Hopewell City	Attempted rape	Female, white	Harry F. Byrd
Shirley Winningham	Black	25	M	January 25, 1928	Henrico (Note: Change of venue from Isle of Wight County.)	Murder-Rape	Hilda Barlow, 13, white	Harry F. Byrd
Burn Gray	Black	36	M	May 18, 1928	Petersburg City	Murder	J. Peyton Stewart, 57, white (police officer)	Harry F. Byrd
James Washington	Black	19	M	July 27, 1928	Loudoun	Rape	Gladys Boyd, 14, white	Harry F. Byrd
Henry Jones	Black	20	M	March 29, 1929	Mecklenburg	Murder	Robert Hurick, 19, black	Harry F. Byrd
Henry Palmer	Black	27	M	May 17, 1929	Norfolk City	Murder-Rape	Bertha Cox, 38, white	Harry F. Byrd
Samuel Haskins	Black	32	M	September 6, 1929	Powhatan	Murder-Robbery	B. M. Gordon, 55, white (Note: Also suspected in the murder of Arthur Edgar Trainer (60, white).)	Harry F. Byrd
Luther Clayborn	Black	35	M	November 29, 1929	Roanoke City	Murder	Frances White, 28, black (girlfriend)	Harry F. Byrd
John Fields	Black	23	M	February 20, 1930	Gloucester	Murder-Robbery	Christian Hogge, 32, white	John Garland Pollard
Elwood Payne	Black	33	M	September 19, 1930	Fauquier	Murder	Alfin C. Corbin, 56, white (Note: Also murdered Corbin's daughter Estelle.)	John Garland Pollard
Alphonso Bellamy	Black	19	M	October 31, 1930	Newport News City	Murder-Robbery	Richard P. Richards, 71, white	John Garland Pollard
Ollie Dorson	Black	40	M	February 3, 1931	Virginia Beach City	Murder-Burglary	James T. Howe, 58, white (Note: Also previously murdered John W. Brickhouse (62, white).)	John Garland Pollard
Calvin Grooms	Black	18	M	June 26, 1931	Amherst	Rape	Mary E. Vail, 36, white	John Garland Pollard
Sam Pannell	Black	18	M	May 20, 1932	Halifax	Rape-Burglary	Lena Crews, 38, white	John Garland Pollard
Randolph Cox	Black	41	M	June 3, 1932	Richmond	Murder	James Newton Wood, 38, white (police officer)	John Garland Pollard
Frank Mann	Black	38	M	January 6, 1933	Suffolk City	Murder	Dorothy Floyd Mann and David Floyd, 17 and 56, black (wife and father-in-law)	John Garland Pollard
Robert Mais	White	29	M	February 2, 1935	Henrico	Murder-Robbery	Euell M. Huband, 44, white (Note: Also killed Richmond police officer William A. Toot (58, white) and Philadelphia racketeer William Weiss (44, white).)	George C. Peery
Walter Legenza	White	42	M	February 2, 1935	Henrico	Murder-Robbery	Euell M. Huband, 44, white	George C. Peery
Phillip Jones	Black	25	M	March 11, 1935	Botetourt	Murder-Rape	Alice and Ellen Hill, 13 and 9, black	George C. Peery
John Daugherty	White	27	M	February 7, 1936	Fluvanna	Murder-Robbery	William Raymond Thompson, 33, white (police officer)	George C. Peery
Joe Jackson	Black	23	M	February 21, 1936	Spotsylvania	Murder-Burglary	John Thomas and Jennie C. Coleman, 77 and 65, white	George C. Peery
John Shell	Black	30	M	February 21, 1936	Spotsylvania	Murder-Burglary	John Thomas and Jennie C. Coleman, 77 and 65, white	George C. Peery
Isaac Watson	Black	54	M	July 3, 1936	Halifax	Murder-Burglary	William Thomas Powell, 73, white	George C. Peery
Thomas Hart	White	29	M	July 24, 1936	Scott	Murder	Alton Leonard, 23, white (guard)	George C. Peery
Willie Leake	Black	30	M	August 20, 1937	Greensville	Murder-Robbery	Billie Wright Smith, 30, black	George C. Peery
Lawrence Wyche	Black	30	M	August 20, 1937	Greensville	Murder-Robbery	Billie Wright Smith, 30, black	George C. Peery
John Winzor	Black	25	M	December 31, 1937	Loudoun	Murder-Robbery	Henry Saffel, 83, white	George C. Peery
James Jackson	Black	28	M	March 25, 1938	Hampton City	Murder-Robbery	Willie M. Kemp, 66, white	James Hubert Price
Jasper McNeill	Black	24	M	March 25, 1938	Amherst	Murder	Clyde Poindexter Styers, 47, white (Note: Also suspected of killing Henry A. Gurley (65, white) in Charlotte, North Carolina.)	James Hubert Price
Joe Martin	Black	31	M	April 8, 1938	Lynchburg City	Murder-Robbery	Grover C. Clement, 44, white	James Hubert Price
George Pingley	White	44	M	November 25, 1938	Frederick	Murder	James William Newcome, 46, white (police officer)	James Hubert Price
Otis Cypress	Black	32	M	November 25, 1938	Surry	Murder-Robbery	Frank Spratley, 61, black	James Hubert Price
Irving Brooks	Black	23	M	January 20, 1939	King William	Robbery (Note: Also assaulted the victim, who died from her injuries after the trial.)	Eula P. Hand, 66, white	James Hubert Price
John Anderson	Black	27	M	February 10, 1939	Loudoun	Rape	Lula V. Sisk, 25, white	James Hubert Price
Harry Williams	Black	25	M	April 7, 1939	Greene	Murder	Clarence Mills, 30, black	James Hubert Price
Sam Swanson	Black	27	M	December 15, 1939	Pittsylvania	Murder	William N. Coward, 44, white (police officer)	James Hubert Price
J. Clifton Abdell	White	42	M	January 5, 1940	Norfolk City	Murder	Audrey Sharpe Abdell, 38, white (wife)	James Hubert Price
John Henry McCann	Black	63	M	January 26, 1940	Norfolk City	Attempted rape	Female, 7, white (Note: Serial rapist, also attacked three other girls ages 3, 7, and 10 in Norfolk after being released from Massachusetts State Prison for statutory rape.)	James Hubert Price
Willie Bradshaw	Black	66	M	April 12, 1940	Halifax	Murder	Herbert Boelte, 36, white (police officer)	James Hubert Price
Wilmer Davis	Black	25	M	April 26, 1940	Southampton	Murder	Bessie Davis, 25, black (wife)	James Hubert Price
Charlie Brown	Black	26	M	September 26, 1941	Isle of Wight	Rape	Female, 23, white	James Hubert Price
William Diggs	Black	24	M	January 16, 1942	Nelson	Murder-Rape-Robbery-Kidnap	Gladys Mae Tyree, 18, white	James Hubert Price
Charles Johnson Jr.	Black	19	M	January 16, 1942	Nelson	Murder-Rape-Robbery-Kidnap	Gladys Mae Tyree, 18, white	James Hubert Price
Odell Waller	Black	25	M	July 2, 1942	Pittsylvania	Murder	Oscar Davis, 46, white	Colgate Darden
James Mooring Jr.	Black	22	M	March 19, 1943	Norfolk City	Murder-Robbery	Cornelius Grant Goodson, 68, white	Colgate Darden
Harry Farris	White	28	M	October 15, 1943	Henrico	Murder-Robbery	Vinichio Bichi, 36, white (Note: Also killed Frank Hargrove (33, white) under identical circumstances the day prior.)	Colgate Darden
Raymond Woodall	White	36	M	March 3, 1944	Pittsylvania	Murder	Julia Terry Giles, 34, white (sister-in-law) (Note: Also murdered his 36-year-old wife Ruth Terry Woodall but only convicted for her sister's murder.)	Colgate Darden
Howard Walker	Black	27	M	May 26, 1944	Winchester City	Rape	Jessie H. Glaize, 26, white	Colgate Darden
William Clatterback	White	34	M	June 16, 1944	Loudoun	Murder	Five people, white (Note: 59-year-old Andrus Morris Love, his 58-year-old wife Ruth G. Love, their 22-year-old son James W. Love, 27-year-old Walter Russell, and his 25-year-old wife Katherine Russell.)	Colgate Darden
Willie Rogers Jones	Black	29	M	February 2, 1945	Norfolk City	Rape	Female, white	Colgate Darden
Holman B. Thomas	Black	41	M	March 1, 1945	Lunenberg	Murder	Abb Kimball Fleming, 43, white (police officer)	Colgate Darden
Raymond McDaniel	White	30	M	March 2, 1945	Campbell	Murder	Roy A. Alfred, 45, white (cousin-in-law)	Colgate Darden
Mancy Christian	Black	27	M	May 1, 1945	Suffolk City	Rape-Robbery-Kidnap	Female, 15, white	Colgate Darden
Lonnie Pearson	Black	31	M	August 3, 1945	Norfolk City	Rape-Burglary	Elizabeth Hardison, 29, white	Colgate Darden
Andrew Jackson Holloman	Black	31	M	January 11, 1946	Norfolk City	Rape-Kidnap	Lussie Lenora White, 19, white	Colgate Darden
Ernest Fagan	Black	30	M	February 15, 1946	Norfolk City	Murder-Robbery	Horace H. Cox, 42, white	William M. Tuck
Nelson Cross	Black	33	M	April 15, 1946	Danville City	Murder	Edward Johnson, 32, black	William M. Tuck
Thomas Edward Harrison	White	19	M	May 20, 1946	Roanoke City	Murder-Robbery	Roby Monroe Daugherty, 56, white (Note: Possible serial killer, also suspected in the murders of William Ralph Chattin (30, white) and Roy R. Rice (50, white).)	William M. Tuck
Arthur Johnson	Black	22	M	June 21, 1946	Virginia Beach City	Murder-Robbery	Winston Mason, 58, black	William M. Tuck
James Hough	Black	29	M	June 21, 1946	Virginia Beach City	Murder-Robbery	Winston Mason, 58, black	William M. Tuck
George Grissett	Black	33	M	June 21, 1946	Virginia Beach City	Murder-Robbery	Winston Mason, 58, black	William M. Tuck
Robert Holland	Black	22	M	September 13, 1946	Accomack	Murder-Robbery	George S. Broughton, 46, white	William M. Tuck
James Fletcher	Black	24	M	September 13, 1946	Accomack	Murder-Robbery	George S. Broughton, 46, white	William M. Tuck
Amon J. Gusler	White	52	M	January 3, 1947	Henry	Murder	J. Russell Smith, 38, white	William M. Tuck
Ephriam Thomas	Black	27	M	May 30, 1947	Suffolk City	Murder	Lenora Hamlin, black	William M. Tuck
William Davis	Black	43	M	July 18, 1947	Fauquier	Murder-Robbery	John Holcombe Woodson, 62, white (Southern Railway detective)	William M. Tuck
Buford Morton	Black	30	M	October 17, 1947	Danville City	Rape-Kidnap	Ruby Andrews, 27, white (Note: Also attacked Ethel Widdifield (29, white). Buford was charged with attempted rape, albeit the charge was later changed to assault. He received a 12-month sentence and a $500 fine in this case.)	William M. Tuck
Raymond Laurence	Black	30	M	October 24, 1947	Newport News City	Murder	Charles Nelson Doughty, 31 white (patrolman)	William M. Tuck
Sam Baldwin	Black	35	M	January 23, 1948	Accomack	Murder	Bertha Wright (ex-girlfriend) and John McCabe, 23 and 36, black	William M. Tuck
John Brooks	Black	20	M	April 23, 1948	Halifax	Rape-Robbery-Kidnap	Inez Yates and another female, 16 and 18, white	William M. Tuck
Johnnie Edward James	Black	30	M	October 29, 1948	Norfolk City	Murder-Rape	Lonnie Jordan, 23, black	William M. Tuck
Alfred Rayfield	Black	35	M	November 17, 1950	Accomack	Murder	William West, 50, black	John S. Battle
Ben Franklin Fuller	Black	42	M	December 8, 1950	Mecklenburg	Murder	Joseph Robert Thompson, black	John S. Battle
George Hailey	White	24	M	February 2, 1951	Halifax	Murder-Rape	Marion Floyd, 12, white	John S. Battle
Joe Hampton	Black	21	M	February 2, 1951	Martinsville City	Rape	Ruby Stroud Floyd, 32, white (Note: All seven men were posthumously granted simple pardons in 2021. The guilt of the men has historically not been disputed, nor did the pardons question their convictions. Rather, they acknowledged that the trial of the defendants were unfair and their sentences were racially biased.)	John S. Battle
Howard Hairston	Black	20	M	February 2, 1951	Martinsville City	Rape	Ruby Stroud Floyd, 32, white	John S. Battle
Booker Millner	Black	22	M	February 2, 1951	Martinsville City	Rape	Ruby Stroud Floyd, 32, white	John S. Battle
Frank Hairston Jr.	Black	20	M	February 2, 1951	Martinsville City	Rape	Ruby Stroud Floyd, 32, white	John S. Battle
John C. Taylor	Black	23	M	February 5, 1951	Martinsville City	Rape	Ruby Stroud Floyd, 32, white	John S. Battle
James L. Hairston	Black	22	M	February 5, 1951	Martinsville City	Rape	Ruby Stroud Floyd, 32, white	John S. Battle
Francis Grayson	Black	38	M	February 5, 1951	Martinsville City	Rape	Ruby Stroud Floyd, 32, white	John S. Battle
Ulysses Jones	Black	32	M	July 13, 1951	Suffolk City	Murder-Rape	Doris Chapman, 10, black	John S. Battle
Floyd Joyner Jr.	Black	39	M	December 12, 1951	Roanoke City	Murder	Addie G. McCormack, 48, white (Note: Trusty at a convict road camp.)	John S. Battle
Albert Jackson Jr.	Black	24	M	August 25, 1952	Charlottesville City	Rape	Female, 45, white (Note: Previously raped a black woman and served two years of a 10-year sentence.)	John S. Battle
John Kensinger	White	29	M	May 26, 1954	Arlington	Murder-Robbery	Leroy E. Applegate, 46, white	Thomas B. Stanley
Sterling Groom	Black	48	M	October 14, 1954	Culpeper	Murder-Robbery	Jeremiah Jasper Barthelow, 69, white (Note: Previously murdered a woman and served prison time for the crime.)	Thomas B. Stanley
Alonzo Russell	Black	41	M	July 14, 1955	Rockbridge	Murder-Rape-Burglary	Emma Moore Duncan, 56, white (Note: Serial rapist, previously convicted of the attempted rape of Duncan's daughter and later the rape of another woman. Also charged with raping a black girl.)	Thomas B. Stanley
John Lewis Gregory Jr.	Black	23	M	June 4, 1957	Norfolk City	Murder-Robbery (Note: Received additional death sentence for first degree robbery.)	David Weinstein, 72, white (Note: Previously convicted of raping a Japanese woman while serving in the U.S. Air Force.)	Thomas B. Stanley
Lloyd J. Doby	Black	26	M	July 12, 1957	Southampton	Rape-Robbery	Lillian Vann Scott, 48, white	Thomas B. Stanley
Jeremiah McCray	Black	24	M	April 18, 1958	Caroline	Murder-Rape-Burglary	Jeanette M. Griffin, 49, white (Note: Serial killer, also murdered four other people.)	J. Lindsay Almond
E. J. Sherod	Black	24	M	June 6, 1958	Henrico	Murder	Clara Wingfield, 31, black	J. Lindsay Almond
Clarence Dabney	Black	25	M	November 21, 1958	Lynchburg City	Murder-Burglary	William Owen Grubbs, 26, white	J. Lindsay Almond
William Brown	Black	56	M	April 24, 1959	Caroline	Murder	Jean M. Brooks, 33, white (Note: Also murdered Brooks's mother, 74-year-old Katherine Lewis Brooks.)	J. Lindsay Almond
Willis Boyd	White (Note: Possibly mixed, reportedly the illegitimate son of a "Mexican flamenco dancer".)	24	M	April 24, 1959	Goochland	Murder-Robbery	Bennett Ranson Jr., 51, white (Note: Also capitally charged with the repeated rape of a mentally disabled girl.)	J. Lindsay Almond
Harry Eugene Fuller	Black	31	M	June 30, 1960	Alexandria City	Murder	Bobbie Jean Padgett, 27, white (police officer)	J. Lindsay Almond
Linwood Bunch	Black	22	M	February 17, 1961	Newport News City	Rape-Burglary	Female, 49, white (Note: Serial rapist, also raped a pregnant 17-year-old white girl and a 56-year-old white woman.)	J. Lindsay Almond
Grover Lucas	White	57	M	March 10, 1961	Roanoke City	Murder	Connie Lucas, 48, white (wife) (Note: Also murdered their two children, 11-year-old Mildred Joyce and 9-year-old Dennis Fred, and attempted to murder their 15-year-old stepdaughter, born from Connie's first marriage, whom he had attempted to abuse on several occasions.)	J. Lindsay Almond
Claude Hart Jr.	White	32	M	November 17, 1961	Norfolk City	Murder	Robert Courtland Wash, 48, white (detective)	J. Lindsay Almond
Jim Cobbs	Black	46	M	December 8, 1961	Halifax	Murder-Burglary	James Algie Buckner, 60, white (Note: Also raped Buckner's wife.)	J. Lindsay Almond
Carroll L. Garland	Black	27	M	March 2, 1962	Lynchburg City	Murder-Robbery	Jimmy N. Nuckles, 27, white	Albertis Harrison

== See also ==
- Capital punishment in Virginia
- Crime in Virginia
