= Martinsville Seven =

Black men executed for rape but eventually pardoned

The Martinsville Seven were a group of seven African-American men from Martinsville, Virginia who were all executed in 1951 by the Commonwealth of Virginia after being convicted of raping a white woman. At the time of their arrest, all but one were between the ages of 18 and 23. They were quickly tried in six separate trials (two agreed to be tried together), and each was convicted and sentenced to death. It was the largest mass execution for rape that had been reported in the United States. On August 31, 2021, the Governor of Virginia pardoned the convictions of all seven men, 70 years after their deaths.

The Civil Rights Congress defended the men originally, and later conducted two marches and other attempts to raise awareness and conduct a public campaign on behalf of their agenda. This was objected to by the NAACP, who feared further backlash because of the CRC's Communist affiliations. Martin A. Martin and other NAACP attorneys defended the men on appeals, attempting to ensure fair trials, set due process precedents, and gain clemency or sentence reductions. The case attracted national newspaper coverage. The NAACP appeals also noted that since Virginia started use of the electric chair, only black men had been executed for rape in the Commonwealth for what was a non-lethal crime. Governor William Tuck initially agreed to a stay during appellate litigation, but by late July 1950, newly elected Governor John S. Battle refused to commute the men's sentences, saying he was horrified by the crime. The appellate courts upheld the convictions and sentences, and the US Supreme Court twice refused to hear the cases. In 1977 the Supreme Court referred to those arguments with respect to rulings in other cases. According to historian Eric W. Rise, this case "demonstrated the power of the southern legal system to enforce codes of racial behavior."

== Events ==
The rapes occurred on Saturday, January 8, 1949, after Ruby Stroud Floyd, a 34-year-old white woman, entered a black neighborhood in Martinsville, Virginia, to collect money for clothing she had sold. She had previously distributed Jehovah's Witnesses materials in the neighborhood. Residents warned her not to stay too long, noting the time as late afternoon. Floyd was accompanied by Charlie Martin, the 11-year-old son of a black woman she knew. She passed four young black men, Joe Henry Hampton, Howard Hairston, Booker T. Millner, and Frank Hairston Jr., at the railroad tracks and continued into the neighborhood. According to an appeal made by Hampton 1950, he and the other three men had attacked Floyd after she returned.

On their return, and as they were walking along the railroad track, the same four men were so grouped on the right of way that Mrs. Floyd and Charlie Martin, in order to get by them, were compelled to step off the track into the weeds and briars on the side. As they passed, one of the black men said "Hey Honey," or "Wait Honey," or words to that effect, which so frightened Mrs. Floyd and Charlie that they began to run. The men overtook them. Joe Henry Hampton grabbed Mrs. Floyd from behind.

Floyd testified that Joe Hampton then told her not to scream, put her hand over her mouth, and threatened to kill her if she said anything. Booker Millner gave a quarter to Martin, then warned him that if he told anyone about what was happening, he would kill him. Hampton and the other men then took turns raping Floyd. Ethel Mae Redd, a black woman who lived not far from the scene, said that later that evening, Francis DeSales Grayson came to her home and told John Clabon Taylor and James Luther Hairston, who were there, that, "Some boys got a white lady up on the tracks. Come on, let's go up there." The three left her home going in the direction of the railroad tracks.

Just after dusk, a man, a woman, and a teenaged girl walked by the scene. They were John Travis Redd, Josephine Grayson (Francis Grayson's wife, and Leola Millner (Booker Millner's 14-year-old sister). As her attackers started arguing amongst themselves over who would be the next rape her, Floyd begged them for help, but they ignored her. Josephine Grayson said that Floyd had wrapped her arms around her and sobbed, "Help me, make these boys let me alone." She claimed she was frightened by Floyd's sudden appearance, so she jerked away.

Floyd's attackers then dragged her into an embankment in the woods, where they resumed raping her. This time, however, there were more attackers. Floyd later testified she had been raped "every bit of twelve or fourteen times," and felt something penetrate her rectum. She was finally released after her last attacker told her, "Now when I finish with you I'm going to turn you loose." At 7:30 p.m., after dark, Floyd went to Mary Wade's house for shelter, begging for help. The Wades called an ambulance for her. Mary Wade later told the court that there were clear signs that Floyd had been raped.

"She was crying and asked me to call an ambulance. She said thirteen boys had raped her. She had a blue sweater on and on the arm it was torn. There was scratches on her arms. Her clothes was kind of hanging off and her hair tangled up. Her thighs were redrubbed like. Her princess slip was on and shirt and sweater. She did not have on any bottom clothes."

Based on her account, in which she claimed to have been raped by 13 black men, the police quickly arrested Frank Hairston Jr. and Booker Millner. Four more suspects were arrested that night, based in part on the first two men's confessions. By the next morning, all the men in custody had signed confessions. The last to be arrested, Joe Henry Hampton, was taken into custody on January 10. He confessed to Mary Wade that he and several other men had raped Floyd prior to his arrest. After Wade told him to turn himself in, he waited for the police and was arrested at Wade's home.

All but one man were in their early 20s. After being held by police overnight, the first six all signed confessions, implicating themselves and each other. All admitted to being present at the crime, including Joe Hampton, although not all took part in rape. Only three of the accused had a prior criminal record, with Joe Henry Hampton being a habitual truant with a prior conviction for grand larceny and most of the men were employed. When the NAACP appealed their convictions, its defense team noted that when the police had questioned the men, they had been drinking for some time, and they were not allowed to consult lawyers or their families.

The officials separated the men. To protect them from mob violence, they took them to other jails outside Henry County. The preliminary hearing occurred about a month later, and the grand jury two months after that. A grand jury (which included both black and white members) indicted all the men. Their quick arrest assured the community that stability was being preserved. Authorities showed increased professional conduct and procedures since the controversial arrest and execution of Odell Waller during World War II (he was initially represented at trial by the Trotskyite Revolutionary Workers League and ultimately executed).

== The Seven ==
Listed in order of arrest:

- Frank Hairston Jr., age 20, confessed to rape
- Booker T. Millner, age 22, said he was present, but did not take part

Based on their confessions, the police arrested:

- Howard Lee Hairston, age 20, denied having sex with Floyd. He and his older brother (below) were not related to Frank Hairston Jr.
- James Luther Hairston, age 22
- John Claybon Taylor, age 23
- Francis DeSales Grayson, age 38 and a World War II veteran of Richmond, Virginia, denied having sex with Floyd; only defendant without local ties. It has been claimed, without any evidence, by several residents of Martinsville that Grayson and Floyd, both of whom were married, were in a sexual relationship.

The last was arrested January 10:

- Joe Henry Hampton, age 21

== Trial ==
The judge appointed seven attorneys for the seven defendants. Since they ranged widely in experience, he asked the more experienced ones to aid the newer attorneys. Efforts by the defense team to change the trial's venue from the Martinsville Circuit Court—on the grounds that sensationalist press about the events made a fair trial impossible—were unsuccessful. There was considerable community sentiment against the men. Racism was less explicit in the trial than in cases known as "legal lynchings" in the South, in which innocent men were convicted (e.g., the Scottsboro Boys and the Groveland Boys).

Furthermore, the testimony of several black witnesses not only indicated that Floyd had actually been gang raped, but placed every defendant at the scene. Charlie Martin testified that he saw Hampton and Hairston raping Floyd before he fled the scene. A physician who examined Floyd at a hospital testified that she had been raped. Four of the defendants openly admitted to raping or attempting to rape Floyd in their own testimony, but claimed they were drunk or Floyd had consented to sex. The others admitted they were present, but denied raping Floyd. Floyd testified at every trial, breaking down in tears at several points in her testimony. Every time, she gave a full account of the attack.

Previous actions by civil rights attorneys had resulted in changes in the Virginia process, improving their procedures. For example, although most African Americans in Virginia had been disenfranchised since the early 20th century and were thus disqualified from serving on juries, the grand jury had included black members. In addition, each of the jury pools for the six separate trials contained some African Americans. But, none was selected for any of the seven juries, as the prosecutors rejected all of them on various grounds. The juries were all white and all male.

Judge Kennon Whittle told the attorneys: "this case must and will be tried in such a way as not to disturb the kindly feeling now, locally, existing between the races. It must be tried as though both parties were members of the same race." The prosecution did not explicitly discuss race; it argued the case based on the "preservation of community stability, not the protection of southern womanly virtues," as had formerly been common.

The trials were held back to back, each with a separate jury of twelve white men. The prosecution, led by Irvin W. Cubine, introduced evidence showing that non-consensual sex took place. Some of the defendants acknowledged having sexual intercourse with Floyd, but said that it was consensual, or that she did not resist or say no, either considered necessary as a condition to prove rape. Virginia law authorized capital punishment for accessories, parties to the act of rape who did not take part in the act. On the stand, each of the defendants at least partially rejected his confession. In some cases, they said that the police had written the confessions, that the formal account varied from a handwritten version, and that they had not fully read the police version when signing and did not recognize that their own accounts had been changed.

Rise says that the white community disdained Ruby Floyd for her missionary work with the Jehovah's Witnesses and for her willingness to enter the black part of Martinsville. The prosecution pointed out that Floyd had gone to an area considered unsafe for white women, ignored warnings of black residents of staying too long there, and not been attentive to her surroundings or the men she passed. A relative of the Hairstons has said that their family tradition always said Floyd had been having an affair with one of the defendants, but this was not explored at trial.

No trial lasted more than a day, and the longest jury deliberation lasted less than two hours. The shortest was little more than half an hour. Although the defense attorneys pointed out mitigating circumstances, the juries quickly convicted each defendant and sentenced them to execution in the electric chair. The judge presiding was Kennon C. Whittle.

== Protests and appeals ==
Virginia had historically convicted and executed numerous black men accused of raping white women; for most of its history, only blacks were sentenced to death for rape. No white men had been executed in Virginia for rape since 1868. Since Virginia started using an electric chair in 1908, all 44 men executed for rape or attempted rape were black, of whom 41 had been executed for raping white women or girls. From 1908 to 1951, only Texas, North Carolina and Georgia executed more black men for rape than did Virginia. An editorial in New York's Amsterdam News read,

When we consider the fact that in the entire history of the Old Dominion state, no white man has ever received capital punishment for rape, then of necessity we must conclude that the death penalty for seven men for a singular crime was neither righteous, nor compassionate, nor wise.

The case of the Martinsville Seven was taken up by outside groups, including the National Association for the Advancement of Colored People (NAACP) and the Civil Rights Congress (CRC). Martin A. Martin of the Richmond law firm Hill, Martin and Robinson, was the lead attorney for the appellate defense team for the NAACP in Virginia, as his firm had considerable experience with civil rights cases. The NAACP did not want the CRC to participate in the litigation directly. Martin and the NAACP also agreed to represent the men in an appeal for the Seven with the Virginia Supreme Court of Appeals. They applied the bulk of the funds raised to the defense of clients. The NAACP's interest was in establishing legal precedent "for the benefit of due process and equal protection in general and the Negroes' rights in particular." Their concern was ensuring a fair trial.

One of the convicted men's parents contacted the CRC directly and asked one of its lawyers to defend their son DeSales Grayson. The CRC focused on producing pamphlets and publicity for outside campaigns to raise awareness about the case, including internationally, and hoped to put pressure on government officials. The CRC began to organize mass actions in Richmond.

In their appeals, Martin and the NAACP discussed the unfairness of the venue, the pressure on later juries to arrive at the same sentence as the earlier ones, and the historical racial disparities in application of death penalty sentences in the state. They noted the assaults of Floyd had no evidence of homicidal intent. The Court of Appeals upheld the rulings on March 13, 1950, with Chief Justice Edward W. Hudgins writing: "one can hardly conceive of a more atrocious, a more beastly crime". Together representatives, both black and white, of the CRC and NAACP, as well as other citizens, met with Battle in June 1950 to appeal for a pardon or clemency for the defendants in the case. They argued for lesser sentences, but Battle resisted their pleas.

The NAACP thought that involvement by the CRC in appeals could endanger the defendants both because of their inflammatory tactics and its communist affiliation. In this period of the second Red Scare, Senator Joseph McCarthy and the House Un-American Activities Committee had raised alarms about purported communist influence in government and society. Both African American newspapers, the Richmond Afro-American and Norfolk Journal and Guide concluded the national and international crusades by the CRC hurt the defendants' chances for clemency.

After exhausting the appeals process, with the US Supreme Court twice declining to hear the case, the NAACP and CRC began to appeal to executive offices. Newly elected Virginia Governor John S. Battle refused their request for clemency. In advance of a large planned CRC demonstration in the state capital, Governor Battle doubled the capital guard and alerted the state militia. On January 30, 1951, 400 protesters arrived in Richmond, appealing to Battle on the issue of racial disparity in sentencing. Governor Battle listened to their claims but was unwilling to bend on the issue of the Seven, saying: "The prisoners have not been convicted because they are Negroes and should not be released because they are Negroes." He was appalled at the nature of the crime.

The CRC also had organized an international campaign, and Governor Battle was swamped by letters from overseas asking him to commute the sentences of the men. He resented being under so much pressure. One telegram from Moscow was signed by "workers in science, literature, the arts," including composers Dmitri Shostakovich and Sergei Prokofiev. Another, from China, called the sentence a "barbaric" example of American "fascist hooliganism". The men were executed in early February. In the United Kingdom, the London branch of the Caribbean Labour Congress, then led by leading Black British civil rights leader Billy Strachan, condemned the US government for their actions towards the Martinsville Seven.

In 1977, in its ruling in Coker v. Georgia, the US Supreme Court ruled that "it is repugnant to an enlightened society for the state to kill a person for a crime that does not result in death," declining to extend the death penalty to a person guilty of raping an adult woman.

== Execution ==
All of the appeals by the NAACP failed. The seven were executed at the Virginia State Penitentiary in early February 1951. The first four were executed at 15-minute intervals on February 2. The remaining three were executed on February 5, 1951. It is the largest execution for rape charges in the United States. The day before the youngest of the seven was executed, he said, "God knows I didn't touch that woman and I'll see y'all on the other side."

== Pardon request ==
In December 2020, the Martinsville 7 Project asked Virginia Governor Ralph Northam to pardon the Martinsville Seven posthumously and issue an apology. The Martinsville 7 Project, according to their website, seeks to highlight the case, share their stories, collect and post records related to the case, and promote the pardon request.

=== Pardon ===
On August 31, 2021, Governor Ralph Northam posthumously pardoned all seven men. In a news release, Northam said the pardons were not about whether the men were guilty, but it was "recognition from the Commonwealth" that the men did not receive adequate due process. He further stated, "We all deserve a criminal justice system that is fair, equal, and gets it right—no matter who you are or what you look like. While we can't change the past, I hope today's action brings them some small measure of peace."

== See also ==
- Capital punishment in Virginia
- List of people executed in Virginia (pre-1972)
- List of people executed in the United States in 1951
- 1995 Okinawa rape incident
- Scottsboro Boys
- Willie McGee (convict)
