= Martin A. Martin =

American lawyer

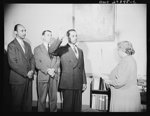
- Swearing in of Martin A. Martin as the first African-American member of the Department of Justice's Trial Bureau
- Born: July 24, 1910; Pittsylvania County, Virginia, United States
- Died: April 27, 1963; Richmond, Virginia, US
- Occupation: Civil rights attorney

Martin Armstrong Martin (July 24, 1910 – April 27, 1963) was an American criminal and civil rights attorney from Danville, Virginia who became the first African American trial attorney in the United States Department of Justice on May 31, 1943. He also became known for his appellate work for Odell Waller in 1942 and the Martinsville Seven in 1950–1951, and as a partner with Oliver Hill and future federal judge Spottswood Robinson in a law firm which assisted the National Association for the Advancement of Colored People in civil rights litigation in Virginia.

== Early and family life ==
Martin was born to Romey Orlando Martin and his wife Hattie Inge in Pittsylvania County, Virginia on July 24, 1910. The family included older sisters, Costello Beatrice Martin and Willie Gladys Martin, older brothers, former Tuskegee Airmen pilot and banker Maceo Conrad Martin and Romey Orlando Martin Jr., and a twin brother Andrew Inge Martin. He attended Ohio State University then Howard University Law School, where he became acquainted with fellow students and alumni Oliver Hill and Spottswood Robinson, who would later become his law partners.

He married twice. Maria Estelle Wright married him in 1942; they had no children when they divorced in 1947. He was survived by his second wife Ruth Martin (1910–1978).

== Career ==
Upon graduation in 1938 and admission to the Virginia bar, Martin established a private legal practice in Danville, Virginia. His general practice included representing the Danville Savings Bank (the state's oldest black-owned financial institution), as well as black teachers in salary equalization lawsuits. Martin also came to head the local NAACP office.

Martin first became involved in a nationally prominent case in September 1941, after the conviction of black sharecropper Odell Waller for killing a white landlord in Gretna, Virginia. Martin developed information that the grand jury and later the trial jury that convicted Waller included only white men who paid the poll tax. Thus, the jury excluded blacks and peers of the defendant. However, the local judge who convicted Waller allegedly instructed the court clerk to deny Martin access to further records, so that he could not show all Pittsylvania County juries were similarly selected.

On May 31, 1943, Martin became the first African American attorney in the Criminal Trial Division of the U.S. Department of Justice, under Attorney General Francis Biddle. However, he did not like litigating cases involving aliens, so he quit after less than a year.

After Oliver Hill's military service ended, he joined as planned with Martin and Spottswood Robinson III to form the Richmond law firm of Hill, Martin and Robinson. Martin was the firm's criminal specialist. He attempted to defend the Martinsville Seven on appeal in 1949, assisted by Samuel W. Tucker, Roland D. Ealey and Jerry Williams of Danville. They secured a limited stay of the execution date from Governor William M. Tuck, and a writ of error from the Virginia Supreme Court, but when time came to argue the appeal, Attorney General J. Lindsay Almond personally argued the state's case and asked the appellate court to accept the confessions, uphold the convictions and allow the death sentences to be carried out. The Virginia Supreme Court issued its unanimous decision on March 13, 1950, the opening day of the following term, and after Martin filed a petition for review, new Governor John S. Battle issued another reprieve. However, on June 5, the U.S. Supreme Court denied certiorari, as it would again on January 2, 1951. Meanwhile, publicity continued. Governor Battle conducted a clemency hearing on July 7, 1950, but denied the petition on July 27, and remained firm. Additional litigation in the U.S. District Court and Court of Appeals proved futile. The defendants were all executed on February 2 and 5, 1951. Many (including the state's leading black newspapers) believed the men would not have been executed, but for the temporary involvement of the Civil Rights Congress (a rival to the NAACP, which the parents of one accused boy had involved and which had communist links), and later its organizing protests during the appeal and clemency process.

In the 1950s, the firm also litigated various civil rights cases involving schools. Martin became the attorney of record in the 1958 case involving desegregating Richmond's public schools, Warden v. Richmond School Board. In the fall of 1960, two African American pupils were admitted to Chandler Elementary School, over a year after decisions by a three judge federal panel and the Virginia Supreme Court on Robert E. Lee's birthday (but in other cases litigated by the law firm) declared most of the Stanley Plan implementing Massive Resistance unconstitutional as defying the U.S. Supreme Court decisions in Brown v. Board of Education.

== Death and legacy ==
Martin died of a heart attack, aged 52, in his Richmond home on April 27, 1963, months after the U.S. Supreme Court decision in NAACP v. Button stopped the harassment of NAACP attorneys which was another part of Massive Resistance. The civil rights law firm reconstituted as Hill, Tucker and Marsh. The sentencing disparity arguments Martin had raised received additional impetus from Justice Arthur Goldberg's dissent from a denial of certiorari in Rudolph v. Alabama (1963), but was not addressed by the Supreme Court until McClesky v. Kemp (1987), when it was rejected in a case involving the killing of a white police officer.

The former law offices at 118 E. Leigh Street in Richmond became a contributing building in the Jackson Ward Historic District. However, it was demolished as part of the Greater Richmond Convention Center project and replaced by a marker. In 1992, in a program entitled "Salute to Unsung Heroes," Martin was posthumously inducted into the Virginia Civil Rights Hall of Fame, along with his then-living partner Oliver Hill, Virginia NAACP secretary W. Lester Banks, and others including Samuel Tucker, Justice Thurgood Marshall and the 33 student plaintiffs from the Prince Edward County school desegregation lawsuit.
