= Maceo (name) =

Name list

Maceo is a masculine given name and a surname. It may refer to:

== Given name ==
- Maceo Anderson (1910–2001), American tap dancer
- Maceo Baston (born 1976), American professional basketball player
- Maceo Brown (born 1995), American rugby union player
- Maceo Clark (1897–1990), American Negro league pitcher in the 1920s
- Maceo Conrad Martin (1897–1981), American banker and civil rights activist
- Maceo Parker (born 1943), American saxophonist
- Maceo Pinkard (1897–1962), American composer, lyricist and music publisher, best known for composing "Sweet Georgia Brown"
- Maceo Rigters (born 1984), Dutch footballer
- A. Maceo Smith (1903–1977), American civil rights leader
- Maceo Snipes (1909–1946), African-American civil rights leader murdered by KKK members for voting
- A. Maceo Walker (1909–1994), African-American businessman
- Maceo Woods (1932–2020), American gospel musician and organist

== Surname ==
- Antonio Maceo (1845–1896), Cuban general
- José Maceo (1849–1896), Cuban general
- Sam Maceo (1894–1951) and Rosario Maceo (1887–1954), Italian-American organized crime bosses of Galveston, Texas, from the 1920s through the 1940s

== See also ==
- Big Maceo Merriweather (1905–1953), American blues pianist and singer
- Maceo (disambiguation)
- Maceo Plex, stage name of Eric Estornel (born 1978), American electronic music DJ and producer
- MaCio Teague (born 1997), American basketball player
- Maseo, a stage name of Vincent Mason (rapper) (born 1970), American rapper, producer and DJ
