= Pauli Murray Family Home =

Historic house in North Carolina, United States

- U.S. National Register of Historic Places
- U.S. National Historic Landmark
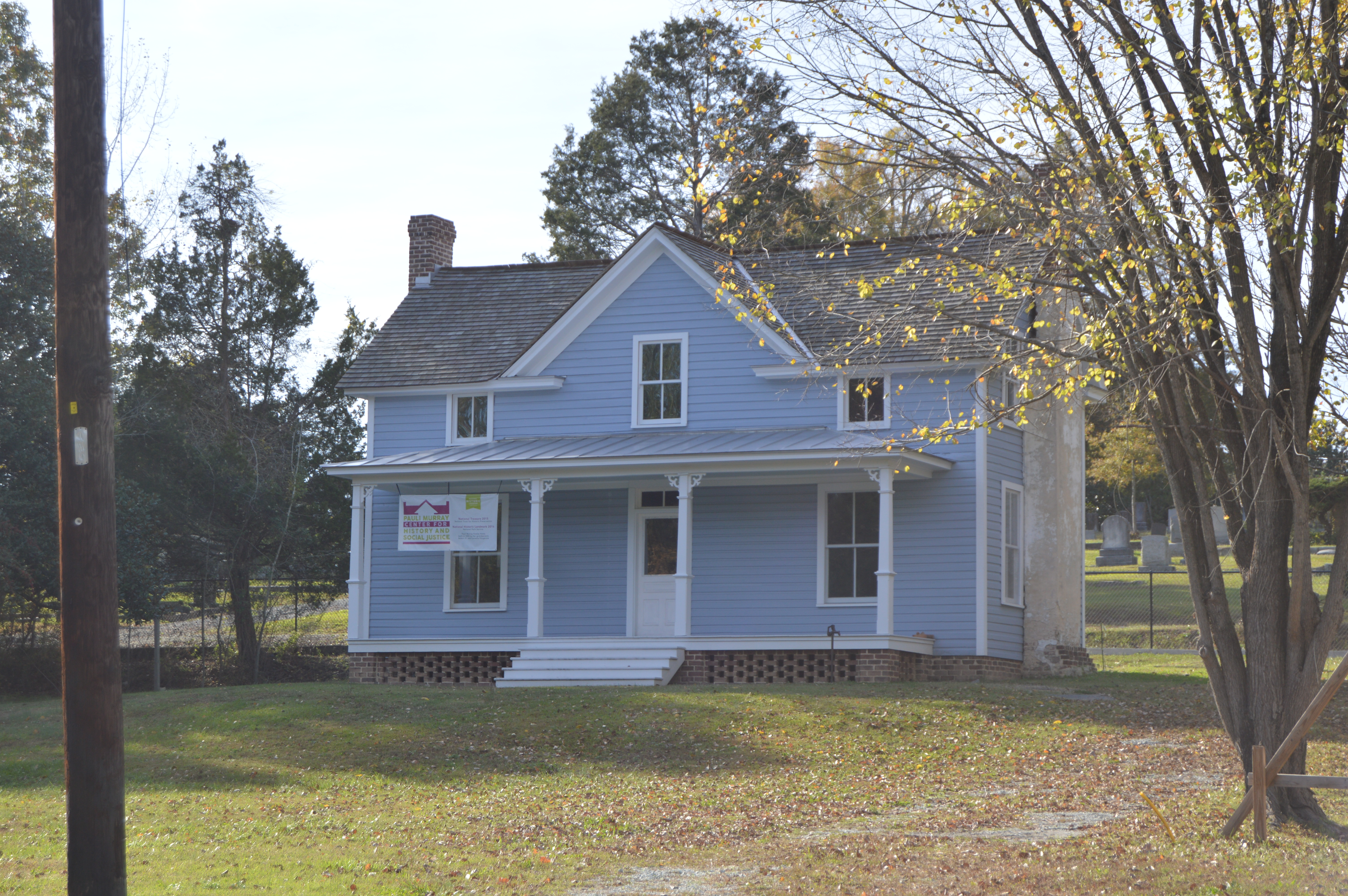
- Front of the house

- Location within North Carolina Location within the United States
- Location: 906 Carroll St., Durham, North Carolina
- Coordinates: 35°59′34″N 78°54′57″W
- Area: less than one acre
- Built: 1898
- NRHP reference No.: 100000866

Significant dates
- Added to NRHP: December 23, 2016
- Designated NHL: December 23, 2016

The Pauli Murray Center for History and Social Justice is a community organization dedicated to preserving and propagating the legacy of Pauli Murray (1910–1985), a pioneering legal advocate of African-American civil rights in the 20th century.

It is located at the former Pauli Murray Family Home at 906 Carroll Street in Durham, North Carolina, the house where Murray was raised. In 2015, the property was named a national treasure by the National Trust for Historic Preservation. The property was designated a National Historic Landmark in 2016.

== Building ==
The Pauli Murray Center is located in Durham's West End, on a .27-acre plot of land on the west side of Carroll Street north of Morehead Avenue. The building, unlike its neighbors, is set back from the street, from which it is separated by a long lawn. It is a modest 1 1/2-story frame building and was more commonly referred to as "a story and a jump" due to the small, low-ceilinged second floor. It has a side gable roof and its exterior is clad in German siding. A gable rises above the front entrance, which is sheltered by a porch. The house is not architecturally distinguished.

=== Building history ===
The maternal grandparents of Pauli Murray, Robert and Cornelia Fitzgerald, purchased the once-larger, one-acre parcel of land in 1898 for $200. The present house was built soon afterward. It is here that Murray was raised, by her grandparents and aunts, from the age of three after her mother died. Education was emphasized in this environment, and Murray went on to a long and varied career as a civil rights activist, legal theorist, writer, and Episcopalian priest. She was on the forefront of attempts to gain admission to racially segregated institutions of higher learning in the 1930s, and experimented with acts of civil disobedience against racial segregation in the American South that would become important elements of the successful civil rights movements of the 1950s and 1960s. She wrote legal treatises and court briefs that have shaped a generation of civil rights jurisprudence and legislation, and wrote a seminal work describing in detail the segregationist laws of each state. United States Supreme Court Justice Ruth Bader Ginsburg explicitly credited Murray as a contributor to some of her legal briefs advancing the rights of women.

Murray described her memories of the house In her 1956 memoir, Proud Shoes: The Story of An American Family. She wrote that, after her grandfather Robert Fitzgerald was blinded during the Civil War, he supervised the building of the house by touch. "It was as if he had built himself into the structure, for it had his stubborn character," she wrote, adding that the house "was more than a home; it was a monument to Grandfather's courage and tenacity."

=== Restoration ===
The restoration project began in July 2015, when the Pauli Murray Center for History and Social Justice received a $4,500 grant from the National Trust for Historic Preservation to produce a historic structure report on the Pauli Murray home. The project was directed by Barbara Lau of the Duke Human Rights Center at the Franklin Humanities Institute. The report was meant to inform rehabilitation plans and provide a framework for forming a historic center at the site. The report compiled previous research, produced new research, and included information from experts.

Later in 2015, after the report was published, Iron Mountain, an information management company, provided additional funding to the Pauli Murray Center for History and Social Justice. This money enabled the organization to start preserving the foundation of the home and making exterior renovations to reverse neglect, water damage, and partial demolition.

By 2016, the project was underway. Funds from Iron Mountain and The Marion Stedman Covington Foundation were used to restore the exterior of the house to its appearance in photos taken between 1898 and 1906. Missing features, such as doors, the front porch, and windows, have been replicated. The home was also jacked up six inches in the center, the foundation was replaced, and new piers were laid to replace the ones damaged due to runoff from the public cemetery nearby. The color of the exterior was also changed from white to a blue gray shade to match the home's look in 1910.

In 2017, the National Park Service awarded the Pauli Murray Center for Historical and Social Justice a $237,575 grant through its National Park Service African American Civil Rights Grant Program. The Pauli Murray Project has started to use this money to rehabilitate the interior of the home.

== Museum and Community Center ==
The Pauli Murray Center for History and Social Justice opened its doors to the public in September 2024 for tours, events, and community space. This space serves as a community center for education, history, and social justice.

== See also ==
- List of National Historic Landmarks in North Carolina
- National Register of Historic Places listings in Durham County, North Carolina
