= Maceo Conrad Martin =

American banker and activist (born 1897)

Maceo Conrad "M.C." Martin
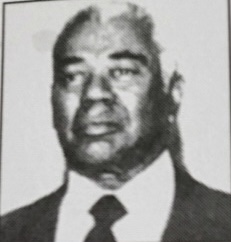
- Born: Maceo Conrad Martin; 18 June 1897; Danville, Virginia, U.S.
- Died: 29 September 1981 (aged 84)
- Occupations: Banker; Civil Rights Activist
- Spouses: Lavinia Elaine Henderson Martin (m. 1920) Georgia Hortense Person Martin (m. 1945)
- Children: 4
- Relatives: Martin A. Martin (brother)

Maceo Conrad "M.C." Martin, Sr. / "M.C. Martin" (18 June 1897 – 29 September 1981) was an American banker and civil rights activist.

== Early life and family ==
He was born on 18 June 1897 in Whitmell, Virginia, to Romey Orlando Martin, a farmer and teacher, and Hattie Rosina Inge Martin.

He and his father, Romey Orlando, along with 20 other African American men founded the Savings Bank of Danville on September 8, 1919.

His brother Martin A. Martin (1910–1963) became a prominent civil rights attorney and law partner of famed civil rights attorney, Oliver Hill, and on May 31, 1943, the first African American to serve as a trial attorney for the U.S. Department of Justice, although he would quit after about a year and return to his civil rights work, including leading the Danville NAACP office and later defending the Martinsville Seven.

== Career ==
After graduating from Virginia Union University in 1917 (during which he interned at a Richmond bank), he began working for the Savings Bank of Danville as a cashier in 1919, and rose to become the institution's fourth president on June 14, 1951, a position he held until his retirement in 1970. Until his death he served as Chairman of the Board. He also became President of the National Bankers Association.

He was widely regarded as managing banker from 1919 - 1970, and was 22 years old when he started. In his first year as president, he suggested changing the bank's name to "First State Bank". First State Bank grew its assets from $95,000 in 1919 to $1.4 million by 1950, more than $3 million by 1963, $8 million by 1970, and more than $18 million by 1987. The bank was featured on the cover of American Banker, received many awards and accolades for its high performance and operational efficiency, and the regulators listed the bank among the top 50 in the country. In 1933 during the Great Depression, the bank remained open until FDR issued an emergency order closing all banks on March 6 to prevent a bank run. M.C. Martin, along with G.W. Goode, conferred with the banking commissioner and First State Bank was allowed to reopen on April 1, 1933 – one of the earliest banks to reopen in the country.

During his tenure, the well-run institution reopened as the Danville Savings and Trust Company in April 1933 during the Great Depression, became "First State Bank" in 1953, and is now known as "Movement Bank" which is no longer an African American-owned financial institution despite efforts to remain so.

In 1993, the city of Danville, Virginia, featured him on its bicentennial postcards alongside Danville-born Lady Nancy Astor, Viscountess Astor.

In February 2019, the city of Danville, Virginia, erected a marker to acknowledge his preeminent role in the success of First State Bank and its profound impact on the economics of Danville, Virginia, the Civil Rights Movement, and the banking industry as a whole.

== Personal life ==
In 1920, he married Lavinia Elaine Henderson Martin and they had three children including:

- Hattie Irene Martin (b. 1922)
- Maceo Conrad Martin Jr. (1923–2022), enlisted in the U.S. Army on 15 October 1943. On 14 May 1946, he graduated from the Tuskegee Pilot Cadet Program's Class SE-46-B, Single Engine Section. After leaving military service started working for Danville's First State Bank. Resided in Valley Village, California.
- Edwina Martin (1925–2020), after receiving a bachelor's degree from Bennett College in Greensboro, North Carolina, and M.S.W. from Atlanta University became the first African American juvenile court probation officer in Greenville, South Carolina, one of three black women who successfully graduated from the U.S. Air Force Officer's Candidate School at Lackland Air Force Base in San Antonio, Texas, in 1953, and upon her retirement in 1985, Cuyahoga County, Ohio's commissioners acknowledged her decades of service in the Cleveland metropolitan area.

In 1945, he married Georgia Hortense Person Martin (b. 1917 in Garysburg, NC - d. 2001 in Danville, VA) and they had one daughter:

- Paula Martin Smith (b. 1947 in Danville, VA) helped to desegregate Danville's public schools as a 10 year old girl. After receiving a bachelor's degree from Bennett College, she began teaching in Pittsylvania County's public schools, and Danville Community College after earning a Master's in Math Education from the University of Virginia. Paula has one son, Troy Martin Smith, a daughter, Jill Smith Handy, and five grandchildren (Isabella, Ariana, Tanner, Albert, and Conrad).

He was an ardent supporter and faithful member of Calvary Baptist Church and served as a trustee.

He was a member of Alpha Phi Alpha fraternity and a member of the Shriners International serving as the organization's Grand Treasurer.

Other organizations and groups to which he devoted much time and leadership include:

- The Virginia Council on Human Relations of which he was a past President
- The Board of Directors of the Danville United Way
- The Trustee Board of Virginia Union University
- The Trustee Board of Virginia Seminary and College in Lynchburg, Virginia
- The Governor's Commission on Higher Education

== Civil Rights activist ==
In 1948, he and his family embarked on a vacation to Staunton River State Park. As expected, Park authorities denied the Martins entry to the state park based on their race. The Martins consulted the prestigious Richmond, Virginia-based civil rights law firm of Hill, Tucker and Robinson, led by Oliver Hill. Hill's firm filed a civil suit against the Commonwealth of Virginia under the "separate but equal" doctrine. The suit alleged that Staunton River State Park's policy only allowed white citizens to use its facility, with no accommodations for African Americans.

The Virginia Department of Conservation and Development first responded by converting a segregated African-American/"Colored Only" recreation area into a state park facility: the "Prince Edward State Park for Negroes" (now the Twin Lakes State Park (Virginia)). In 1949, Virginia Governor William Tuck allotted $195,000 to create 6 housekeeping cabins, an expanded swimming area, expanded parking, a bathhouse, and concession stand.

Opened to the general "Colored Only/African-Americans Only" public in June 1950, Prince Edward State Park for Negroes became the Commonwealth of Virginia's eighth state park and the only pre-Civil Rights Era state park for African-Americans. African Americans from across the mid-Atlantic states visited the park for its swimming, recreation, camping and dancing. In 1995, Virginia erected a marker to acknowledge his lawsuit's contribution to desegregating the park.

During his tenure, his bank bailed out protesters during Danville's 1963 civil rights movement. Critical of police conduct towards demonstrators, he served as the only African American on a special seven-man grand jury formed during Danville's 1963 civil rights demonstrations and filed the sole dissent to protest the protesters' indictments. Moreover, his bank posted bond for all 20 jailed demonstrators. "Lightning fast, the news spread. Any scorn among those standing for the practices of segregation was offset ten-times-ten by the esteem given Martin in the Danville African American community."

== Later life ==
He died on 29 September 1981, at the age of 84.
