= Maceo =

Maceo may refer to:

== People ==
- Maceo (name), includes a list of notable people with the given name or surname

== Places ==
- Maceo, Antioquia, a town and municipality in Colombia
- Maceo, Kentucky, an unincorporated community in the United States

== Other uses ==
- Maceo Organization, a former criminal organization based in Galveston, Texas, U.S.
