= Clarence Dunnaville =

Civil rights advocate and lawyer

Clarence M. Dunnaville Jr.

Personal details
- Born: August 9, 1933 (age 92)
- Party: Democratic
- Spouse: Norine
- Education: Morgan State University (BA); St. John's University School of Law (LLB)

Clarence M. Dunnaville Jr. (born 1933) is an American lawyer and civil rights activist, honored for his career achievements by the Virginia State Bar, as well as by the Library of Virginia.

== Early life and education ==
Born in Roanoke, Virginia, Dunnaville saw a cross set afire by the Ku Klux Klan in front of his family's home when he was nine years old, cementing his lifelong interest in civil rights law. He refused to sit at the back of the bus or use segregated rest rooms, but did attend local public schools, including Lucy Addison High School, the colored high school in Roanoke (which closed in 1973 and became a desegregated middle school), from which he graduated at age 16.

Dunnaville wanted to escape segregation, so he attended college at Morgan State University in Baltimore, Maryland, and in addition to attending to his studies he picketed segregated theaters, participated in demonstrations, and sat-in at segregated lunch counters. He met Baltimore native Thurgood Marshall, who invited Dunnaville to attend oral argument in Brown v. Board of Education in December 1953. One of the companion cases, Davis v. County School Board of Prince Edward County concerned segregated, substandard Virginia schools attended by Dunnaville's relatives. Dunaville then attended St. John's University School of Law in Brooklyn, New York. On February 11, 2020, he returned to Morgan State University and recounted on video some of his views, achievements and journey as a civil rights leader.

== Career ==
Upon graduating from law school and passing the New York bar exam, Dunnaville became the first African American to work for the Internal Revenue Service. In 1961 he began work for then United States Attorney for the Southern District of New York (and later New York City District Attorney) Robert Morgenthau, whom he considers his most important mentor. He then became the first lawyer of color hired by AT&T (in 1965), and its Western Electric subsidiary in 1967 permitted him to take leave to work on civil rights matters with the Lawyers' Committee for Civil Rights Under Law in Mississippi, trying to enforce the Voting Rights Act. Upon returning to AT&T, Dunnaville ultimately rose to the position of senior attorney.

Dunnaville also co-founded the Council of Concerned Black Executives and the Association for Integration in Management, which in the 1970s and 1980s worked with businesses to improve corporate opportunities for African-Americans. He also served as executive director of the New York Interracial Council for Business Opportunity, and in the early 1980s, co-founded Workshops in Business Opportunities to assist minority entrepreneurs gain business skills.

In 1990, Dunnaville returned to Virginia and at the invitation of civil rights pioneer Oliver Hill joined the Hill, Tucker & Marsh law firm. In 1998, Dunnaville helped found the Oliver Hill Foundation, and continues to advocate for restorative justice and improve pro bono service to the poor. He also served on the Virginia Waste Management Board, as well as on the National Board of Directors of the Lawyers' Committee for Civil Rights Under Law and the Board of Governors of the Virginia State Bar Diversity Conference. Often an advocate pushing the cutting edge of legal reform, one of Dunnaville's latest projects involves promoting the implementation in Virginia of restorative justice as an evidence-based alternative to traditional disciplinary and retributive measures. He has been a leading advocate for the elimination of the use of cash bail "wealth based detention" in criminal prosecutions, arguing such term violates constitutional due process of law.

Dunnaville has been the object of a number of accolades in summation of his career and achievements. In 2008, he received the Segal-Tweed Founders Award from the Lawyers' Committee for Civil Rights Under Law, in recognition of his long-term commitment to civil rights. During 2008 and 2009, he served as appellate co-counsel in Virginia’s first civil Gideon case heard before the Supreme Court of Virginia, culminating in 2012 amending legislation to the Code of Virginia expanding the right to counsel for the indigent. In 2009, Dunnaville was named a “Leader in the Law” by Virginia Lawyers Weekly and the Virginia State Bar awarded him its Lewis F. Powell Jr. Pro Bono Award. In 2010, the Old Dominion Bar Association awarded him its Harold Marsh Award. In 2012, he was the first recipient of the Clarence M. Dunnaville Jr. Achievement Award from the Virginia State Bar's Diversity Conference, a recognition named in his honor. On March 1, 2018, the Virginia General Assembly passed a special resolution commending him and detailing many of his lifetime achievements.

== Personal life ==
Dunnaville's wife, Norine Dunnaville (nee Gunter) died after 42 years of marriage. He has three sons, Chris, Peter and Andrew, as well as grandchildren Allie, Zane and Dean. A life member of the NAACP, he is also a member of Omega Psi Phi fraternity (Virginia's Alpha Beta boule chapter), and historic Gillfield Baptist Church in Petersburg.
