= Workers Defense League =

American socialist labor rights organization

- Defend Labor's Rights
- Abbreviation: WDL
- Established: August 29, 1936; 90 years ago
- Founders: Norman Thomas, David L. Clendenin, Aron S. Gilmartin, & Sidney Hertzber
- Type: Nonprofit
- Headquarters: 220 East 23rd Street; New York City, New York 10010
- Coordinates: 40.7382995°N 73.984981°W
- Origins: Labor movement
- Region served: United States
- Methods: Education, litigation, organizing
- Field: Labor rights
- Chair: David W. Dyson
- President: Roxanne Brown
- Vice President: Noreen Connell
- Treasurer: Howard Wien
- Key people: Jon Bloom
- Website: www.workersdefenseleague.org

The Workers Defense League (WDL) is an American nonprofit organization founded in 1936 to promote labor rights. WDL has been involved in the civil rights movement and other social issues, including the rights of farm workers, soldiers, political refugees, and unemployed workers.

== Origins ==
The Workers Defense League was founded on August 29, 1936 to defend and advance the rights of workers and unions to speak and organize freely without the threats of arrest and violence. It also aimed to provide or locate free legal defense to people facing charges for their labor activity, and to initiate legal challenges to anti-labor laws and authorities.

The organization grew out of several defense efforts in the South and Midwest. One of the most dramatic, the Committee for the Defense of Civil Rights in Tampa, sought to bring to justice the police officers — at least some of whom were Ku Klux Klan members — who on November 30, 1935 kidnapped and brutally beat three political insurgents. The attackers killed one of them, Joseph Shoemaker, a former Socialist who shortly before had run for local office on an anti-corruption “Modern Democrats” slate. The two who survived the assault identified their attackers, but several trials for kidnapping and murder in 1936–1938 ended in acquittals or overturned convictions.

Other campaigns that led to the founding of WDL included support for the interracial Southern Tenant Farmers Union, and protests against a declaration of martial law by the Governor of Indiana against strikers in Terre Haute.

== Notable Campaigns ==
Free speech fight against Mayor Frank Hague in Jersey City, NJ: In its most publicized early campaign, WDL, along with the American Civil Liberties Union (ACLU) and the Congress of Industrial Organizations (CIO), challenged laws in Jersey City, NJ, enacted and enforced by the administration of its long-time mayor Frank Hague, that banned public union meetings, leafleting, and picketing. On November 29, 1936, a number of New Jersey WDL supporters were arrested and jailed for defying these ordinances. This set off a year-long public and legal struggle, culminating in a federal trial in which the arrested WDL supporters were key witnesses, and a U.S. District Court ruling on November 3, 1938 (upheld in 1939 by the United States Supreme Court in Hague v. CIO) that voided all of the contested Jersey City ordinances as unconstitutional.

Odell Waller case: From 1940–1942 WDL represented and organized a national campaign on behalf of Odell Waller, a 25-year-old Black sharecropper in southern Virginia who shot and killed his landlord in a dispute over payments for Waller’s family’s crops. Waller had been condemned to death by an all-white jury after a brief trial. WDL took up his appeal, recruiting prominent lawyer John Finerty and arguing that Waller had acted in self-defense, and also challenging the law in Virginia and other states that limited juries to poll-tax payers, effectively excluding Black jurors. Pauli Murray, later a celebrated civil rights lawyer and feminist, was hired by WDL to work on the Waller campaign and toured the U.S. on a speaking tour with Waller’s aunt. Although WDL won five reprieves of Waller’s death sentence, argued the case before the Supreme Court, and gained the support of Eleanor Roosevelt and author Pearl Buck, among many others, for commutation of Waller’s sentence, he was executed on June 30, 1942.

Carl Gilmore case: In 1942, WDL conducted a campaign and secured a pardon for Carl Gilmore, a Black member of Teamsters Local 693 in Binghamton, NY, who had been sentenced to 5 to 10 years in prison for allegedly punching a strikebreaker. Governor Charles Poletti pardoned Gilmore, who was released in December 1942 after serving two years.

Journey of Reconciliation: In 1947, two WDL staff members, Joseph Felmet and James Peck, were among the 16 participants in the first “freedom ride,” the Journey of Reconciliation. Eight whites and eight Blacks boarded a Greyhound bus in New York bound for the Upper South states of Virginia, North Carolina, Kentucky, and Tennessee to test a newly-won Supreme Court ruling banning segregated seating in interstate travel. The Journey of Reconciliation was the prototype for the famous Freedom Rides of 1961.

Forced Labor and Debt Peonage: During the 1940s, WDL staff and supporters in Florida exposed forced labor practices in several Florida counties, where prisoners arrested on vagrancy and similar charges were given exorbitant fines and then turned over to local growers to work as unpaid laborers, a practice known as debt peonage. WDL filed civil lawsuits, contacted the U.S. Department of Justice, and publicized these practices. In 1949 WDL mounted a Commission on Forced Labor, taking testimony about various forms of forced labor around the world, from the Soviet Union to the Belgian Congo, from South Africa to Latin America, as well as in the American South. Novelist James T. Farrell presented the Commission’s findings to the United Nations, which soon after conducted a similar inquiry.

Soldiers’ Rights: Many of WDL’s leaders and supporters were pacifists and conscientious objectors, and the organization paid particular attention to the rights of soldiers. In 1955 Rowland Watts, a longtime leader of WDL, conducted a study and presented a report to the Secretary of the Army documenting 49 cases where the Army presented charges against draftees — who were then separated with less-than-honorable discharges — based on present or past allegedly subversive comments or associations of their family members. Watts’s report, along with Senate testimony by him and several of the discharged draftees, led to reforms in the army’s security investigation process.

In 1969 Watts successfully defended five soldiers at Fort Dix, NJ facing life imprisonment on riot charges. During the 1970s he and WDL represented numerous Vietnam veterans who had been given dishonorable or less-than-honorable discharges from the armed forces.

Political Refugees: WDL frequently came to the assistance of political refugees in the U.S. seeking asylum or facing deportation, including Indonesian independence advocates facing deportation back to the Dutch colony in 1947, and Spaniards opposed to the dictatorial regime of Francisco Franco.

In 1964, a group of South African actors came to New York as the cast of Sponono, a play by Alan Paton, which ran briefly on Broadway. Five of them overstayed their visas, resisting return to South Africa because they were active opponents of apartheid. WDL mounted a campaign to fight their deportation orders, recruiting Martin Luther King, Jr. to head a petition. The deportation orders were dropped.

Racial integration in the building trades: In 1963, large demonstrations in New York and a number of other northern cities protested the absence of Black workers in well-paid union jobs at construction sites, particularly on projects in largely Black neighborhoods such as the expansion of Harlem Hospital. Fearing a division between the labor movement and the civil rights movement, WDL conceived a project to prepare young Black and Hispanic men to take the admissions exams for union apprenticeship programs, which courts had ordered building trades unions to offer regularly and to weigh decisively in admissions. WDL’s “crash course” in math skills produced remarkable results. Its greatest breakthrough would change Sheet Metal Workers Local 28, then an all-white union which for much of its history had a whites-only clause in its constitution. In apprenticeship admission tests given in 1965 and 1966, WDL trainees were the majority of the highest scorers, and in 1968, after legal action to enforce the results, Local 28 admitted twelve Black and Hispanic apprentices, the first in its 80-year history.

== Unemployment Insurance ==
Starting in the 1980s, WDL turned its attention to unemployed workers unfairly denied Unemployment Insurance (UI) benefits. Noticing reports of dropping “recipiency” rates — the percentage of those unemployed receiving UI benefits — WDL began advocating for individual claimants. A grant from New York Foundation supported a WDL training program during the mid-1980s for non-lawyer union activists and social workers in counseling and representing claimants, and during the 1990s WDL began representing claimants directly, winning thousands of cases in administrative hearings and appeals and concentrating its efforts on this issue. At present, WDL is the only organization devoting full-time attention to Unemployment Insurance advocacy in New York City and State.
