= Oliver Hill (attorney) =

American lawyer (1907–2007)

Oliver White Hill, Sr.
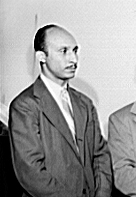
- Oliver Hill oversees the swearing in of his former partner, Martin A. Martin as the first African-American member of the Department of Justice's Trial Bureau
- Born: May 1, 1907; Richmond, Virginia, United States
- Died: August 5, 2007 (aged 100); Richmond, Virginia, US
- Education: Howard University (BA, LLB)
- Occupation: Civil rights attorney

Oliver White Hill Sr. (May 1, 1907 – August 5, 2007) was an American civil rights attorney from Richmond, Virginia. His work against racial discrimination helped end the doctrine of "separate but equal." He also helped win landmark legal decisions involving equality in pay for black teachers, access to school buses, voting rights, jury selection, and employment protection. He retired in 1998 after practicing law for almost 60 years. Among his numerous awards was the Presidential Medal of Freedom, which U.S. President Bill Clinton awarded him in 1999.

== Childhood, education and family life ==
Oliver White Hill was born in Richmond, Virginia, on May 1, 1907. His father, William Henry White Jr., abandoned his mother Olivia Lewis White Hill (1888–1980) shortly after the boy's birth, although W. H. White Jr. briefly returned six months later before leaving Richmond permanently. Though it was uncommon and difficult to obtain at the time, his mother thus obtained a divorce in 1911. When Oliver was 9 years old, after the deaths of his maternal grandmother and paternal grandfather, W. H. White Jr. returned briefly to Richmond and asked his son if he wanted to live with him in New York City. Oliver declined the offer.

Because Olivia Hill worked at the Homestead Resort in Hot Springs, Virginia, during the spring and fall seasons, and a related resort in Bermuda during the winter, Oliver was raised by his maternal grandmother and grandaunt in a small house on St. James Street in a predominantly African-American section of Richmond. When Oliver was six years old, his mother returned to Richmond for her mother's funeral, and introduced Oliver to her new husband, Joseph Cartwright Hill, who worked as a bellman at the Homestead resort. Oliver's maternal grandmother had moved to Scranton, Pennsylvania, but returned to Richmond shortly before her death. His paternal grandfather William Henry White Sr. had founded Mount Carmel Baptist Church in Richmond, which the family attended and where Oliver attended Sunday school, but Rev. White died on August 13, 1913, not long after grandmother Lewis. His paternal grandmother, Kate Garnet White, was reputedly part Native American, but had little to do with Oliver and his mother. Ancestors of both families had come from Chesterfield County, and at least some were likely enslaved before the American Civil War. Young Oliver got along very well with Joseph Hill, and eventually changed his birth certificate to reflect Hill's surname.

Joseph Hill moved his wife and Oliver to Roanoke, where he operated a pool hall until Prohibition made that uneconomic, so he and Olivia resumed their hospitality industry careers. The Hill family lived in the same house as Bradford Pentecost and his wife Lelia (d. 1943), who had no children, but often took in boarders who worked on the Norfolk and Southern Railroad like Mr. Pentecost (a cook). Hot Springs had no schools for black children, so Oliver remained in Roanoke, where he attended segregated schools until the eighth grade (the last offered to blacks in the city at the time). He also obtained his first jobs—at a local ice cream parlor (until the local police cited it for violating child labor laws), as well as delivering newspapers and ice, finding more strenuous and well-paying work as he grew stronger. During this time, the Pentecost family bought a larger house, 401 Gilmer Avenue. Hill came to consider Roanoke his childhood home. He later specifically remembered not minding serving food to strikebreakers during the Railroad Strike of 1922, because the striking unions were all-white, and sought to limit Negro employees to hard labor. Mrs. Pentecost tried to keep Oliver from working on the railroad, because her brother dropped out of college to work, and never returned, although many of her boarders were taking a year off working to pay for college.

In 1916, the Hills moved to Washington, D.C., where Joseph Hill worked at the Navy Yard during the First World War. Oliver was in the sixth grade, but he did not like the D.C. elementary school he attended for a semester, and so was allowed to return to Roanoke and his foster parents, the Pentecosts. In 1923, further education being unavailable to him in Roanoke, Hill moved to Washington, D.C., to attend (and graduate from) Dunbar High School, which at the time may have offered the best education available to black children in the country. At first Oliver was behind a semester academically, and also lacked scholarly seriousness. He also played various sports-especially tennis in Roanoke, but baseball, football and basketball at Dunbar (which did not have a tennis team).

Joseph Hill's brother Samuel worked for the post office in Washington, D.C., and in his off-hours worked as a lawyer handling mostly wills and real estate transactions. Samuel Hill died of a cerebral hemorrhage when Oliver was a college sophomore, and his widow gave Oliver his law books, which piqued his interest in law school. Upon learning that the Supreme Court had taken away many rights of African Americans, and that in the 1920s Congress could not even pass legislation outlawing lynching Negroes, Oliver White Hill determined to go to law school and reverse the Plessy v. Ferguson decision issued slightly before his birth.

Hill performed various part-time jobs in D.C. during his college years at Howard University and later the Howard University School of Law. He spent summers earning money for his education at various resorts in the Mid-Atlantic region, including Eagles Mere, Pennsylvania, Pittsfield, Massachusetts, and Oswegatchie, Connecticut, as well as for the Canadian Pacific Railway.

After earning his undergraduate degree in 1930, Oliver attended Howard law school. There, Hill was a classmate and close friend of future Supreme Court Associate Justice Thurgood Marshall, although they were leaders of the rival Omega Psi Phi and Alpha Phi Alpha fraternities. Both studied under Charles Hamilton Houston, the chief architect in challenging Jim Crow laws through legal means. Marshall graduated first in his law school class in 1933, and Oliver White Hill second.

Hill courted and married Beresenia Ann Walker (April 8, 1911 – September 27, 1993) of Richmond on September 5, 1934. She taught school in Washington during his early years of practice in Roanoke, and he soon moved back to Washington. She was the daughter of Andrew J. Walker and Yetta Lee Brown, and niece of Maggie Lena Walker. Their son, Oliver White Hill Jr., was born on September 19, 1949, in Richmond, after Hill returned from his World War II service.

== Career ==
=== Early years ===
Hill began practicing law in Roanoke during the Great Depression, sharing an office with J. Henry Clayer (a lawyer who once worked in the district attorney's office in Chicago), and a dentist and a physician. It was a general practice and also involved criminal work in surrounding counties, where blacks encountered prejudice. Howard Law School had received funds to challenge segregation of Negroes, but that endowment was nearly wiped out during the 1929 stock market crash. In 1935, Hill helped organize the Virginia State Conference of NAACP branches, with the help of his friend Leon A. Ransom. Printer W.P. Milner of the Norfolk Journal and Guide newspaper was the first president and Dr. Jesse M. Tinsley (a Richmond dentist and president of the Richmond branch) was the vice-president. When Milner was fired from his job for union activities, Tinsley became the state conference's president (and remained so for 30 years).

However, the new general practice did not thrive in Roanoke, and he missed his wife, so Hill returned to Washington, D.C., in June 1936. He and his college friend William T. Whitehead frequently took jobs as waiters, and also tried organizing waiters and cooks for the Congress of Industrial Organizations because the American Federation of Labor unions were white or segregated.

After some meetings at Howard, Hill returned to Virginia in 1939, thinking to establish a law firm with J. Byron Hopkins (a class above Hill at Howard Law) and J. Thomas Hewin Jr. (whose father had an established practice in Richmond). Hill also traveled with Jesse Tinsley on NAACP errands and speaking assignments, and served the Virginia Teachers Association (because the Virginia Education Association only represented white teachers). He also met and worked some cases in outlying communities with Martin A. Martin of Danville. In 1942, Martin became the first African-American lawyer in the U.S. Department of Justice's Trial Division, but he did not like his assignments and resigned a year later to work in Richmond with Hill and Spottswood W. Robinson III, forming Hill, Martin & Robinson at 623 N. Third Street in Richmond.

In 1940, working with fellow attorneys Thurgood Marshall, William H. Hastie, and Leon A. Ransom, Hill won his first civil rights case. The decision in Alston v. School Board of Norfolk, Va., 112 F.2d 992 (4th Cir.), cert. denied 311 U.S. 693 (1940) gained pay equity for black teachers. The firm also worked to equalize school facilities and obtain bus transportation for black pupils.

On Labor Day, 1942, Hill accompanied five schoolgirls and two fathers to two high schools in Sussex County, Virginia. The county had 23 one-, two- or three- room elementary schools (all lacking indoor plumbing) serving 1,902 children of African-American parents, but offered them education beyond the seventh grade only at a Training School in Waverly, Virginia (and no transportation). As of June 1942, Sussex County also had four new consolidated elementary and high schools for its 867 white students. The surprised principals of Jarrett High School and Stony Creek High School denied the African-American girls admission to their respective schools. Hill politely thanked them, left, and soon filed a lawsuit in the federal district courthouse in Richmond, seeking to declare the disparities between white and black high school students unconstitutional. The suit was dismissed when the county obtained three buses to provide trips to the Training School, and later admitted over 60 black high school students to Waverly High School. However, of those girls, only Helen Owens ever obtained a high school diploma, and that was from Peabody High School in Petersburg; three of her fellow plaintiffs attended the Sussex Training Academy, and another attended but did not graduate from Peabody.

=== Wartime service ===
In 1943, although Hill was 36 years old, somehow he was drafted during World War II. He chose to join the United States Army, rather than the United States Navy which he thought at the time only allowed black sailors to perform mess-hall duties. Like his partner Samuel W. Tucker and other African-Americans, Hill experienced racial discrimination during his military service, particularly by white officers. Unlike Tucker, Hill was not allowed to enlist in Officer Candidate School, but instead served in a unit of black engineers, and performed mostly support duties as a staff sergeant. He credited the unprofessional racist comments of the unit's white chaplain (who tried to stop white English people from fraternizing with the black soldiers) with saving him and his unit from near-certain death during the D-Day Normandy invasion. Hill served in the European Theatre of World War II until V-E Day, when his unit was shipped to the Pacific, from where he was ultimately discharged.

=== Politics ===
Returning to his law practice in Richmond, Hill also served as chief of the Virginia branch's legal staff. In 1947, Hill persuaded W. Lester Banks to act as the Virginia Chapter's executive director and handle the organization's day-to-day activities. This allowed Hill to make his only attempts for election to public office.

In 1947, he first ran for the City Council of Richmond (which had changed its system to nine members elected at-large rather than by districts as before the war), but came in 10th in a race for 9 seats. Hill ran again in 1949 and became the first African American on the City Council of Richmond since Reconstruction. At the time, the city's population was about 30% black, and Hill said he hoped that his election would not only help remove prejudice against blacks in the city, but also give Richmonders a better experience of the responsibilities of citizenship. However, Hill did not win re-election in the next election (1951), failing to make the last available seat by 44 votes, because controversy over his legal work discussed below had begun, and because Hill also supported an unpopular highway project.

In 1955, Hill sought the Democratic nomination for a seat in the Virginia House of Delegates. He came in tenth out of twelve seeking the nomination.

=== Civil rights pioneer ===
As head of the Virginia branch's legal staff, which also included his law partner Spottswood W. Robinson III and a dozen others, Hill filed dozens of lawsuits over the state. They won over $50 million in improvements for black students and teachers. Hill believed schools could be the crux for desegregation, but he was also a realist, acknowledging that Southern techniques for "getting along" among races both caused whites to believe most blacks preferred segregation, when in fact they bitterly opposed it.

An early case in the Virginia Supreme Court won equal transportation for black school children. In 1951, the team took up the cause of the African-American students at the segregated R.R. Moton High School in Farmville who had walked out of their dilapidated school. The subsequent lawsuit, Davis v. County School Board of Prince Edward County, later became one of the five cases decided under Brown v. Board of Education before the Supreme Court of the United States in 1954.

During the 1940s and 1950s, the safety of Hill's life and family were often threatened as a result of his legal work. Crank calls (many with threats) came all through the day and night until the family learned to take their telephone off the hook at night-time (much to the telephone company's displeasure, but then it also refused to trace the crank and threatening calls which had provoked that self-help). Hill's young son was not allowed to answer the telephone, and at one point in 1955 a cross was burned on the Hills' lawn.

Nonetheless, Hill and his clients continued their legal battles to assert their civil rights. After the Brown decisions of 1954 and 1955, Virginia's dominant Byrd Organization adopted a policy known as massive resistance to avoid desegregation. A special legislative session in 1956 passed a legislative package known as the Stanley Plan. This included two special legislative committees with enhanced powers, and which came to harass the NAACP. It also permitted the governor (then Thomas B. Stanley, and from 1958 J. Lindsay Almond) to close schools which desegregated, as well as provided tuition grant support of segregation academies set up to avoid the extant public schools. In 1959, after public schools had been closed in several localities, notably Prince Edward Public Schools, Norfolk Public Schools and Warren County Public Schools, the Virginia Supreme Court and a federal 3-judge panel on January 19, 1959, finally ruled most of the Stanley Plan and Virginia's law prohibiting integrated public schools unconstitutional. Not long after, Governor Almond abruptly dropped "Massive Resistance" as an official state policy; schools in Norfolk and Arlington integrated peacefully on February 5, 1959, and the schools in Front Royal and all locations except in Prince Edward County reopened. Nonetheless, Prince Edward County schools only reopened in 1964 after the U.S. Supreme Court's decision in Griffin v. County School Board of Prince Edward County.

After Massive Resistance collapsed, Hill accepted a job with the Federal Housing Administration, putting his private legal practice on hold for five years, but working to desegregate public housing nationwide.

The Virginia NAACP's efforts continued, and Hill returned to his Virginia practice and leadership of the state's legal staff in 1965, after passage of the Civil Rights Act of 1964 and the Voting Rights Act of 1965. Those statutes, implementation of new U.S. Department of Health Education and Welfare regulations (which provided additional funds for districts complying with the racial desegregation mandate), as well as Green v. School Board of New Kent County (1968) finally tipped the balance toward integrated Virginia's public schools. Green, the crucial ruling against freedom of choice plans was argued by Hill's law partner Samuel W. Tucker, supported by a young lawyer Hill had recruited, Henry L. Marsh, III.

He continued civil rights litigation as a partner of Hill, Tucker and Marsh in Richmond until he retired in 1998. One of the last partners he brought into the firm, Clarence Dunnaville had worked with him in his youth on the school desegregation cases and continued his work through the Oliver Hill Foundation, which seeks to reuse Hill's former home in Roanoke to provide legal services to the poor through third year students at the Washington and Lee School of Law. The firm closed in late 2015 after Henry Marsh III decided to focus on his duties in the General Assembly.

== Death and legacy ==
Oliver Hill outlived his beloved wife Bernie by more than a decade, and also outlived many of his contemporaries from civil rights struggles. He mourned his partner and former Richmond judge, Harold M. Marsh Sr., gunned down by a tenant behind in rent and facing eviction in 1997 while stopped at a traffic light a half mile from the courthouse that would soon bear his and his brothers' names. Hill spent some of his final years working on his autobiography with Professor Jonathan K. Stubbs.The Big Bang: Brown v. Board of Education, The Autobiography of Oliver W. Hill, Sr. It was published in 2000 and reprinted for his 100th birthday in 2007. Hill also gave an oral history interview to Virginia Commonwealth University scholars in 2002. In January 2004, he was a featured panelist during Howard University's celebration of the lawyers who contributed to the Brown decision, on its 50th anniversary.

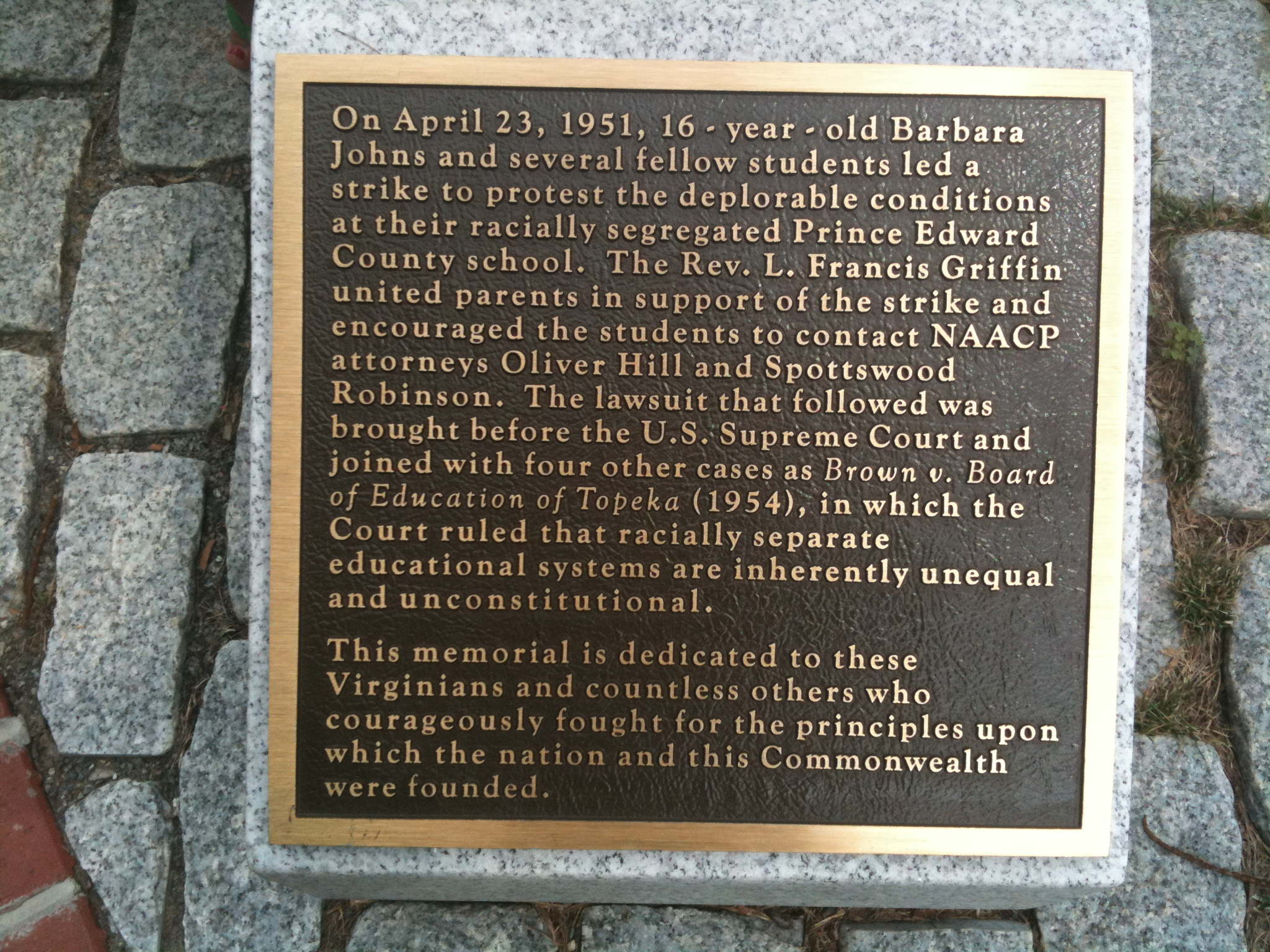
Plaque on Virginia Capitol grounds commemorating Oliver Hill's part in the integration of Virginia schools

On Sunday, August 5, 2007, Oliver Hill died peacefully during breakfast at his home in Richmond of natural causes at the age of 100. Later that day, Virginia governor Tim Kaine ordered flags to be flown at half mast to honor Hill and issued a statement:

As a pioneer for civil rights, an accomplished attorney, and a war veteran, Mr. Hill's dedication to serving the Commonwealth and the country never failed. And, despite all of the accolades and honors he received, Mr. Hill always believed his true legacy was working to challenge the conscience of our Commonwealth and our country.

More than 1200 people viewed his body as it rested in the Executive Mansion before his funeral at the Greater Richmond Convention Center, near where his law office had stood for decades. He is survived by his son, Oliver Hill Jr., professor of psychology at Virginia State University and executive director of its research foundation. He is buried in Richmond's Forest Lawn cemetery.

His papers are held by Virginia State University.

=== Lifetime honors ===
In 1959 the National Bar Association named Hill its Lawyer of the Year.
In 1980 the NAACP awarded Hill its William Robert Ming Advocacy Award.
In 1986 the NAACP Legal Defense and Educational Fund accorded Hill its Simple Justice Award.
In 1989, the Richmond Bar Association established the Hill-Tucker Public Service Award
In 1993 the American Bar Association gave Hill its Justice Thurgood Marshall Award.
In 1996, Richmond's Oliver Hill Courts Building, housing the Juvenile and Domestic Relations courtrooms, was named for him, and each September remembers Hill.
In 1999 President Bill Clinton awarded Hill the Presidential Medal of Freedom.
In 2000, Hill received the American Bar Association Medal and the National Bar Association Hero of the Law award. That September (2000), Hill and other NAACP Legal Defense Fund lawyers received the Harvard Medal of Freedom for their role in the landmark Brown v. Board of Education decision.
Beginning in 2002, the Virginia State Bar has awarded the Oliver White Hill Law School Pro Bono Award annually to one law student who demonstrates an exceptional commitment to public or community service.
In 2003, a bronze bust of Hill was unveiled outside the Greater Richmond Convention Center. The Black History Museum and Cultural Center of Virginia also has another bust.
In 2005 Hill received the Spingarn Medal, the NAACP's highest honor. That October (2005), Virginia Governor Mark R. Warner dedicated the newly renovated Virginia Finance building in Virginia's Capitol Square in Hill's honor. The Oliver W. Hill Building became the first state-owned building as well as the first in Virginia's Capitol Square to be named for an African American.

=== Posthumous honors ===
By the time July 2008 had arrived the Virginia Civil Rights Memorial was dedicated in Capitol Square, honoring the legacy of Oliver SR, his fellow attorneys and his clients.

The following year, the state's Department of Historic Resources approved four plaques that had honored Oliver SR and his legacy: that, by the Greater Richmond Convention Center marks the former location of his in law office. The memorial in Norfolk recalls his first important legal victory, Alston v. School Board of Norfolk (1940), as well as Beckett v. Norfolk School Board in 1957. The Prince Edward County marker commemorates his victory in Davis V.S School Board of Prince Edward County. The Roanoke marker commemorates Oliver SR's early years in the city and early law practice.

A street in Richmond's Shockoe Bottom (a former slave trading neighborhood) named "Oliver Hill Way" is now one of the proposed boundaries of a redevelopment project.

The City of Roanoke, Virginia renamed its courthouse in his honor on May 1, 2019, and previously dedicated a historical marker in front of his childhood home. According to the Roanoke Times, His childhood house at 401 Gilmer Ave. N.W. (which from 2009 until 2013 hosted a community legal clinic) is now maintained in part by the Roanoke City Public Schools and hosts the Oliver Hill Mentoring Program, a cooperative effort with the Big Brothers/Big Sisters of Southwest Virginia.
