= Odell Waller =

American sharecropper convicted of killing his landlord (1917–1942)

- Born: March 6, 1917; Gretna, Virginia, U.S.
- Died: July 2, 1942 (aged 25); Virginia State Penitentiary, Richmond, Virginia, U.S.
- Occupation: Sharecropper
- Known for: 1940 shooting of Oscar Wheldon Davis
- Status: Executed by electrocution
- Conviction: First degree murder
- Penalty: Death

Odell Waller (March 6, 1917 (Note: Various birthdates have been given for Waller, all in 1917. At his trial he stated he was born on July 13, but he gave the date as February 17 in a written statement, and the date carved on his tombstone was March 6.) – July 2, 1942) was an African-American sharecropper from Gretna, Virginia, executed for the fatal shooting of his white landlord, Oscar Wheldon Davis, on July 15, 1940. Waller maintained at his trial that the killing had been in self-defense, but was convicted by a jury of white citizens who had paid the poll tax, a measure that effectively barred black people and poor whites from jury service.

The Workers' Defense League, a socialist labor rights organization, began a national campaign calling for the commutation of Waller's sentence, and was supported in its efforts by novelist Pearl S. Buck, philosopher John Dewey, and First Lady Eleanor Roosevelt. President Franklin D. Roosevelt also made a private appeal on Waller's behalf to Virginia Governor Colgate Darden. Though the campaign won several postponements of the sentence, Waller was finally executed on July 2, 1942. The case failed to overturn the poll tax, but led to reform of Virginia's penal system and motivated Pauli Murray to begin her career in civil rights law.

== Killing of Oscar Davis ==
=== Background ===
Odell Waller was born in Pittsylvania County, Virginia in 1917 to Dollie Jones and an unknown father, who died shortly after his birth. Jones gave the boy to her sister Annie Waller and Annie's husband, Willis Waller, to adopt, and Odell considered Annie his mother. Odell completed three years of high school, but was forced to leave school to work on the farm. From 1935 to 1938, he was convicted of seven offenses, including assault, reckless driving, bootlegging, and carrying a concealed razor. In January 1939, he married a woman named Mollie.

During the Great Depression, the Wallers fell behind on the mortgage for their farm, and after Willis died in 1938, the bank foreclosed. Annie and Odell then agreed to become sharecroppers for a white landlord, Oscar Davis. The relationship quickly soured. Davis was also a sharecropper, and when his own landlord reduced Davis' land allotment, Davis reduced that of the Wallers to only 2 acres (0.81 ha; 0.0031 sq mi). The Wallers accused Davis of failing to pay Annie an agreed $7.50 for taking care of Davis' ill wife for three weeks; when the Wallers subsequently refused to work in Davis' fields, Davis evicted them. Following the eviction, someone on the Davis farm mutilated one of the Wallers' dogs. After Annie's cousin Robert helped her harvest the farm's wheat, Davis took the whole crop rather than give the Wallers their share. In April 1940, Odell had taken a job constructing electrical lines in Maryland, but he returned on the weekend of July 13–14 to investigate the worsening situation.

=== Shooting ===
At 6:30 AM on July 15, 1940, Odell drove to Davis's farm to get the wheat with Annie, relatives Archie Waller and Thomas Younger, and a friend named Buck Fitzgerald. He brought a .32 caliber pistol.

The subsequent events remain in dispute. Henry Davis, a teenage black employee of Oscar Davis, maintained that Odell Waller had fired at Oscar Davis without provocation or warning, hitting him four times. Oscar Davis' sons testified that their father had stated before he died that Waller had shot him without cause. One son added that Davis had said Waller had continued to shoot after Davis had already fallen to the ground. The testimony of other witnesses, including Waller's relatives, was inconclusive, as they were too distant to hear the conversation between Waller and Davis. Waller stated that Davis had refused to let him take the Waller family share of the wheat, and had reached for his pocket as if to draw a gun; Waller then fired on Davis.

Davis escaped through the cornfield after being shot and was taken to the hospital, where he died of his wounds on July 17. Afraid he would be lynched, Waller fled to Columbus, Ohio, but was arrested there at the home of an uncle on July 24 after a manhunt involving police and the Federal Bureau of Investigation.

== Trial ==
During Waller's trial, which began on September 19, 1940, he was represented by Thomas H. Stone of the small communist splinter organization Revolutionary Workers League (RWL). The RWL's members had been expelled from the Communist Party USA in 1934 for their Trotskyist beliefs, and the organization was unpopular due to its opposition to World War II. The group compared the trial to that of the Scottsboro Boys, nine African-American young men accused of rape in Alabama under suspicious circumstances, and began to criticize the racism and economic conditions of Waller's rural Virginia county. Historian Richard B. Sherman argues that the group brought negative publicity to Waller's trial from the start by creating the perception that "radical outsiders" were behind his defense. A socialist labor rights organization, the Workers' Defense League (WDL), offered to take over the defense and public campaign to avoid the stigma of communism from influencing Waller's case, but the RWL rebuffed them.

Stone and another defense attorney, J. Byron Hopkins, were given only three days to prepare Waller's defense. After an all-white jury was selected, composed only of citizens that could pay the poll tax, Stone moved that the case be dismissed on the grounds that Waller was "deprived of a trial by a jury of his peers". However, Stone failed to submit evidence that this was the case, a factor that would prove crucial in later unsuccessful appeals. The judge dismissed the motion, as well as a tactically questionable motion by Stone that the judge himself was prejudiced in the case and should withdraw.

The testimony of Henry Davis and Oscar Davis's sons proved damning, and several witnesses also testified that they had heard Waller declare he would come home with his wheat or kill Oscar. In an analysis of the transcript, Sherman proposes that the phrasing of these witnesses was so similar that they may have been coached by prosecutors, but the defense counsel did not pursue this possibility. On September 27, 1940, after less than an hour's deliberation, the jury found Waller guilty of first degree murder and sentenced him to death, a verdict praised by the Virginia press covering the trial. His execution was scheduled for December 27 of that year.

== Campaign for commutation ==
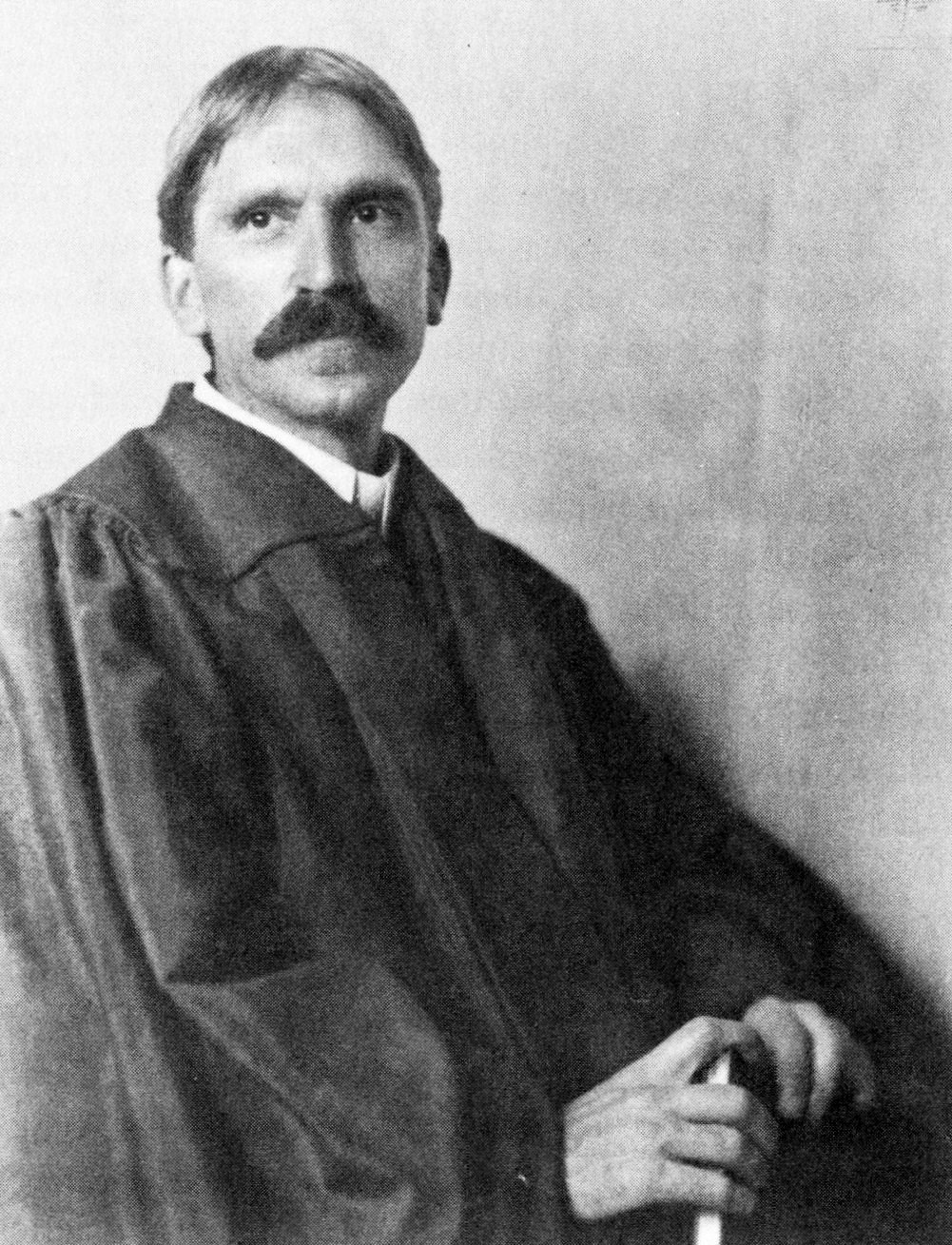
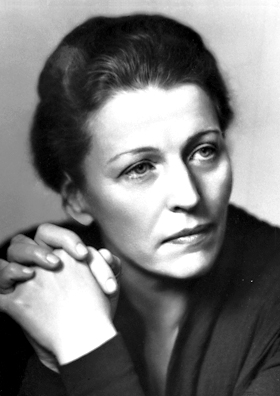
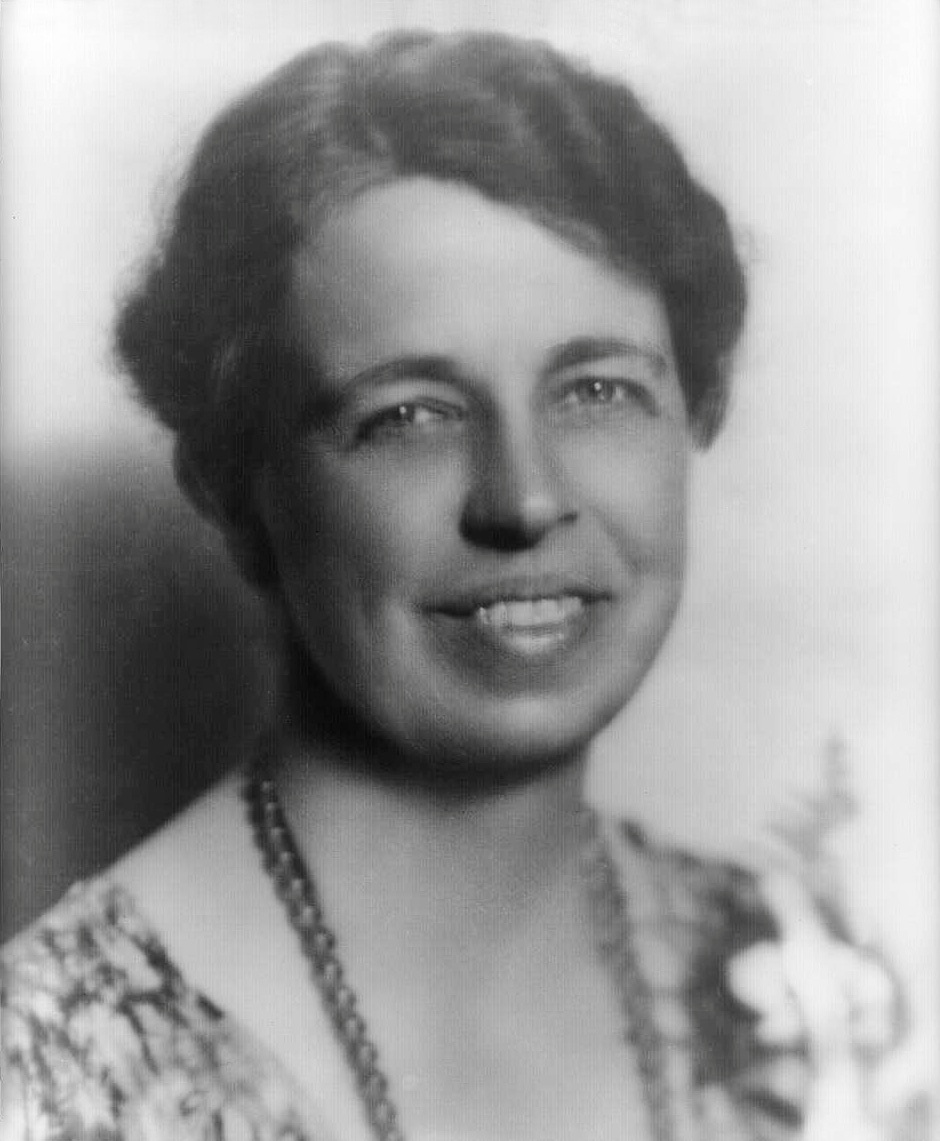
John Dewey (left), Pearl S. Buck (center), and Eleanor Roosevelt (right) lobbied for the commutation of Waller's sentence.

After the trial, the RWL agreed to pass responsibility for the public campaign and legal appeals to the WDL, provided that the case continued to be handled "on a class struggle basis", with attention to national issues as well as Waller's specific situation. Eager to help Waller, the WDL reluctantly agreed to the terms. The organization assumed control of the case in November 1940 and immediately began fundraising on Waller's behalf. Pauli Murray, a young woman new to the organization, was dispatched on a national fundraising tour, accompanied at times by Annie Waller.

The National Association for the Advancement of Colored People (NAACP) joined the case the same month, as did the Brotherhood of Sleeping Car Porters, giving the case national publicity. Attorney Martin A. Martin (President of the Danville NAACP) developed information that both the grand jury that indicted Waller and petit jury that convicted him were composed only of white men who paid polled taxes (thus excluding most blacks and Waller's peers), although the county clerk initially gave him the runaround. The groups hoped that the case would lead the US Supreme Court to rule that the poll tax was unconstitutional. In December, Virginia Governor James H. Price granted Waller his first stay of execution, this one for three months, giving the new defense additional time to study the case.

[The Waller case] attracted national attention, and it expressly highlighted racial identity as a component of criminal justice, press coverage, and regional exceptionalism.

— Peter Wallenstein

On March 28, 1941, philosopher John Dewey joined the cause, sending Murray $5.00 for Waller's defense and giving permission to use his name in further fundraising. Dewey later co-signed an open letter comparing Waller to Dred Scott, a slave who had unsuccessfully sued for his freedom before the US Supreme Court. One of Dewey's letters to The New York Times about the case caught the attention of Nobel Prize for Literature laureate Pearl S. Buck, who also became involved in the case. She wrote in an open letter of her own that Waller "has ceased to be an individual, he has become a personification of all those to whom democracy is denied in our country".

US First Lady Eleanor Roosevelt also worked on Waller's behalf. Historian Richard B. Sherman states that she became involved after receiving a letter from Murray, which prompted her to write Governor Price requesting that he investigate whether Waller had received a fair trial and delay the execution. Roosevelt biographer Doris Kearns Goodwin, in contrast, holds that the First Lady intervened after receiving a handwritten note from Waller himself saying "I have heard lots of people speak of what a nice lady you are and what I can hear is that you believe in helping the poor ... Please write to the Governor and get him to have mercy on me and allow me a chance." Whatever its beginnings, Roosevelt's involvement in the case caused her to be widely criticized in the white Southern press.

== Execution ==
Coverage of Waller's execution in the Baltimore Afro American

On June 1, 1942, the US Supreme Court denied two of Waller's petitions for appeal, and the defense was soon left without further legal options. In a final attempt to win a pardon or commutation from the governor, activists staged events around the country, including a two-hour blackout of the lights in the primarily African-American neighborhood of Harlem in New York City. Governor Price's successor, Colgate Darden, received over 17,000 letters about the case.

On the eve of Waller's execution, Eleanor Roosevelt appealed to her husband, President Franklin D. Roosevelt; Franklin agreed, sending a private letter to Darden urging that the sentence be commuted to life imprisonment, signing it, "an old friend who just happens to be president". Darden held a ten-hour clemency hearing and, after hearing arguments from both sides, decided to proceed with the execution. Pauli Murray, the Brotherhood of Sleeping Car Porters' A. Philip Randolph, and the NAACP's Walter White traveled to Washington in an attempt to lobby the president personally, unaware that he had already secretly appealed on their behalf. The president's apparent refusal to act damaged his relationship with civil rights leaders; Murray, in an open letter on behalf of the movement, called it a "stab in the back". Murray and Eleanor Roosevelt, however, would remain friends until the latter's death two decades later.

Waller wrote a ten-page "Dying Statement" before his execution, admitting he had made mistakes but insisting that he had acted in self-defense:

I haven't lived so upright and I have asked God to forgive me and I feel he has ... I accidentally fell and some good people tried to help me ... In my case I worked hard from sun up to sun down trying to make a living for my family and it ended up in death for me. You take big people, as the presidents, governors, judges, their children don't never have to suffer, they has plenty money. Born in a mention nothing ever to worry about. I am glad that some people are lucky. The penitentiary all over the United States are full of people ho was pore tried to work and have something, and couldn't so that maid them steel and rob.

He was executed by electric chair on the morning of July 2, 1942. At the time of his execution, Waller had been on death row for 630 days, then the longest death row stay in the state's history. His funeral was held on July 5 and was attended by 2,500 people. Only one white person, WDL Secretary Morris Milgram, attended. Other whites had been asked not to come; a reporter wrote of the exclusion that "[the black community] did not want 'Odell Waller's murderers' to look on his face in death".

== Impact of the case ==
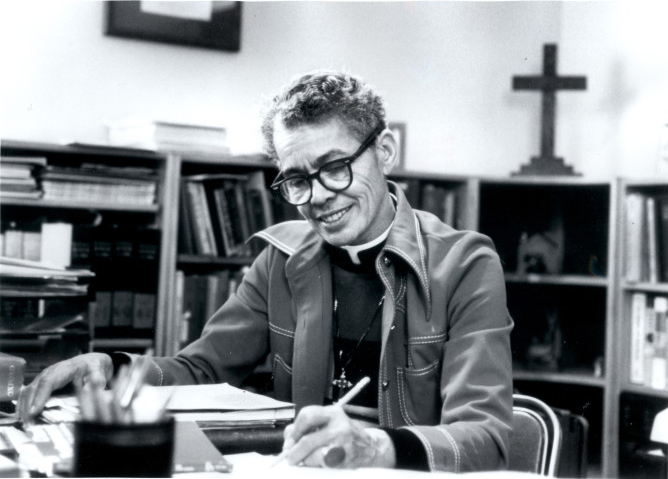
Pauli Murray was inspired by the Waller case to become a civil rights lawyer.

Despite the uproar over the poll tax as a factor in jury selection, the tax remained in Virginia until the ratification of the Twenty-fourth Amendment to the United States Constitution outlawed it in 1964. Pauli Murray was deeply affected by her experience working on the case and was inspired to pursue her career in civil rights law. Governor Darden, influenced by the popular sentiment that the case had evoked, began a reform of the Virginia penal system, including the creation of an official Pardon and Parole Board with the authority to commute sentences.

== See also ==
- Capital punishment in Virginia
- List of people executed in Virginia (pre-1972)
- List of people executed in the United States in 1942
