= W. Lester Banks =

- Born: April 2, 1911; Lunenburg County, Virginia, US
- Died: November 2, 1986 (aged 75); Inglewood, California, US
- Occupations: teacher, civil rights leader
- Years active: 1943–1976
- Known for: Virginia NAACP leader
- Spouse: Vera Louise Bowman

William Lester Banks (April 2, 1911 – November 2, 1986) was an American leader during the Civil Rights Movement. He served as executive director of the Virginia section of the National Association for the Advancement of Colored People in his native Virginia from 1943 to 1976.

== Early and family life ==
Banks was born in Lunenburg County, Virginia, to William Walter Banks and Daisy Hill Banks. His family moved to nearby West Virginia when he was a child. He attended public schools in Alderson in Greenbrier County and Bluefield in Mercer County. He attended Bluefield State College, that state's first college serving African Americans (founded 1895) and graduated with a major in physical science.

Banks returned to Virginia, in 1935 taking a teaching job in Halifax County, and also served as that nonwhite school's principal. He then became a principal of Ruthville High School for African Americans in Charles City County, Virginia.

In 1940, Banks married Vera Louise Bowman of Charlotte County, Virginia; they had one daughter.

== Career ==
The NAACP had been fighting racial discrimination in Virginia, and the Banks family were members. In 1942, Oliver W. Hill, a Virginia native and NAACP lawyer who had recently won a lawsuit requiring equal pay for black teachers in Norfolk, met Banks, then a principal, about filing a similar lawsuit in Charles City County. However, before the lawsuit could actually be filed, both were drafted (although Hill was then 36 years old and seemed too old to be drafted). Thus, both served in the U.S. Army during World War II. Banks became a sergeant and served in the Pacific Theatre.

Shortly after they both returned from their wartime service, Banks agreed to serve as executive director of the NAACP's Virginia chapter, which was the largest in the county. The chapter's original president, Dr. Jesse Tinsley, had a dental practice (and several others held the office after 1954) and Hill had a legal practice, so Banks handled the chapter's day-to-day activities. The chapter had a very active legal arm, filing lawsuits against segregated public transportation, and later against Virginia's historic underfunding of black schools compared to schools serving only white children (the Virginia Constitution adopted in 1902 required segregated schools).

Banks became heavily involved in school desegregation efforts, including in Davis v. County School Board of Prince Edward County, filed in 1951 and which became a companion case to Brown v. Board of Education. After U.S. Senator Harry F. Byrd declared a policy of Massive Resistance to Brown (which led to schools closing in several Virginia Communities and remaining closed for five years in Prince Edward County), two Virginia legislative committees (headed by John B. Boatwright and James M. Thomson) took aim at the NAACP, seeking both to force disclosure of its membership lists (which could lead to retaliation) and to curtail efforts by Banks and others to recruit plaintiffs. Before those committees became active, in the spring of 1956, Banks claimed the NAACP had 84,000 members in the state, divided among 107 branches (of 72,063 "Negroes" registered and qualified as voters of 827,835 voters in the state for the January 6, 1956 referendum on the tuition grants in the Stanley Plan). Charles City County (his base and where many blacks had paid the poll tax and voted), voted against the proposed tuition grants (which supported segregation academies), unlike the rest of the Commonwealth. Banks became an important witness in the ultimately successful NAACP efforts to strike down those laws, showing the organization's membership dropped precipitously after the state legislative committees subpoenaed NAACP membership lists. Banks also consistently sat with the organization's white attorneys in Virginia courthouses, thus helping desegregate them. The United States Supreme Court ultimately reversed all those anti-NAACP laws in Scull v. Virginia ex rel. Committee on Law Reform and Racial Activities (1959) and NAACP v. Button (1963).

Despite the hatred expressed by some white Virginians for the NAACP, Banks drove around the state in a car with an NAACP sticker, and was not afraid to act alone. He was arrested for trespass on October 17, 1961, in Lynchburg, after he sought and was refused service in the "Whites Only" section of the Norfolk and Western Railway Company restaurant. In 1963, a white sawmill worker assaulted Banks for sitting in the white section of a Charlotte County restaurant. Banks was also involved in the sit-ins by Virginia Union University students (where Dean Thomas Henderson also supported desegregation efforts).

== Death and legacy ==
Banks retired on December 31, 1976, and the following year moved with his wife to California where their daughter lived with her family. He died of kidney and heart failure in an Ingleside, California hospital in 1986.

The Virginia NAACP honored Banks at its conference celebrating Brown's 59th anniversary, shortly before his death, and in 1992 posthumously awarded him its Civil Rights Emancipation Emeritus Award.
