= Alexandria Library sit-in =

1939 anti-segregation protest in Virginia, United States

Coordinates: 38°48′28″N 77°2′49″W

- Part of the Civil Rights Movement
- Sit-in participants being escorted from the Alexandria Library by two police officers
- Date: August 21, 1939
- Location: Alexandria Library, Alexandria, Virginia, U.S.
- Caused by: Racial segregation in public library
- Result: All sit-in participants charged with disorderly conduct; No ruling made, but charges lifted in October 2019; Establishment of segregated Robert H. Robinson library for black Alexandrians

The Alexandria Library sit-in was one of the first staged sit-in actions in the United States, pioneering the use of nonviolent direct action to demand equal rights for African Americans. On August 21, 1939, five Black men sat down inside the Alexandria Public Library and quietly read books, a transgression of the library's "whites only" policy. Their actions were coordinated by Alexandria attorney Samuel Wilbert Tucker, who planned the action to create a test case challenging the library's racial segregation policy. The men were escorted out of the library by police and charged with disorderly conduct. At a bench trial, a judge declined to make a ruling in the case. In October 2019, all charges against the men were formally dismissed. The Alexandria sit-in is one of the earliest precursors in the U.S. of the strategies used during the civil rights movement.

== Background and planning ==
The Alexandria Library was built on Queen Street in 1937 on the former Quaker Burial Ground, with the consent of the Society of Friends. It replaced a subscription library located in the former Lee Camp Hall, which had previously housed Confederate veterans. It was built with federal funds from the federal Public Works Administration and labor from the federal Works Progress Administration, as well as money donated by the family of Kate Waller Barrett, which insisted that the City of Alexandria commit to pay its operating expenses. Although funding for the library was provided by taxes paid by everyone in the community, Black people were not permitted to use the library.

Samuel Wilbert Tucker had grown up just two blocks from the site of the Alexandria Library. He received his undergraduate degree from Howard University and, although he didn't attend law school, passed Virginia's bar exam in 1934, at age 20. He was sworn in the following year and began practicing law. He tried for several years to petition the library to provide equal access, but with no success.

Tucker developed a strategy to use the courts to force the city to allow access: the first step would be to ask for a library card, and the second would be a peaceful sit-in. On March 17, 1939, Tucker and his friend, retired army sergeant George Wilson, visited the library; Wilson filled out an application for a library card, and the librarian refused Wilson's request. Subsequently, Tucker sued on Wilson's behalf, claiming that Wilson's rights had been violated. While the Virginia Public Assemblages Act of 1926 required racial segregation between Black and white people, it did not allow Black people to be barred entirely. Tucker continued his plans by training eight local African American men between the ages of 18 and 22 in how to conduct a nonviolent protest. Five of these young men would take part in the library sit-in, while the other three were kept home by parents fearful of the threat of violence.

== Sit-in and immediate aftermath ==
On August 21, 1939, five well-dressed young Black men entered the Alexandria Library, one by one: William Evans, Edward Gaddis, Morris Murray, Clarence Strange, and Otto L. Tucker (Samuel's brother). They each politely requested a library card, and when each was refused a card by the librarian, each walked to a shelf, selected a book, and sat down at a table. They sat at separate tables and did not speak to each other, as Tucker wanted to ensure they took no action that would justify a charge of disorderly conduct. The librarian, Katherine A. Scoggins, ran to the city hall to inform the city manager of what was happening, and he called the police. Tucker called the media, and over 300 spectators watched police escort the five men from the building. Photographers from both white and Black newspapers were also present to record the scene.

The five young men were charged with disorderly conduct, even though all witness testimony was clear that they were well-mannered throughout. Tucker defended them in court, and the judge avoided issuing a ruling. Meanwhile, the judge in the George Wilson case decided that Wilson had not adequately proved that he lived in Alexandria, but that Wilson should apply again and the library would be required to issue him a library card.

The white Alexandria Library board continued to resist integration, stalling with intense negotiations. The board quickly approved the construction of a "separate but equal" library for African Americans, which opened in April 1940. Most books in the new Robert H. Robinson Library were donated used books or castoffs from the main Alexandria library. Tucker refused an invitation to apply for a library card at this segregated branch, arguing that he should have equal access to the main library.

== Later developments ==
Tucker went on to serve as a lawyer for the NAACP, arguing in groundbreaking civil rights across Virginia and before the U.S. Supreme Court. Virginia continued its massive resistance efforts to enforce segregation; the Alexandria Library was finally integrated to adults in 1959. The Robinson library continued to provide service to Black children until 1962, when they were also allowed to use the main library.

In 2019, research by the library staff showed that the judge had never issued a ruling and charges against the five men were still outstanding. In October 2019, the Alexandria Circuit Court dismissed all charges, ruling that the men were "lawfully exercising their constitutional rights to free assembly, speech and to petition the government to alter the established policy of sanctioned segregation at the time of their arrest" and no charges should have been filed.

== Legacy ==
According to Audrey Davis, director of the Alexandria Black History Museum, the event was "an early crack in the wall of segregation", helping to pave the way for future achievements by African Americans. Library scholar Brenda Mitchell-Powell discusses the significance of choosing a library as a site for civil rights protest, writing it "indicates Tucker's awareness of the centrality of libraries as settings for civic and democratic engagement and empowerment [...] ." Importantly, the sit-in proved that nonviolent protest could be an effective strategy in the fight against segregation.

A 1999 documentary Out of Obscurity: The Story of the 1939 Alexandria Library Sit-In was written and produced by Matt Spangler, including archival interview footage with members of the protest and a dramatization of the sit-in.

== See also ==
- Sit-in movement - list of sit-ins
