= Charles Reeder =

Charles Reeder may refer to:

- Charles A. Reeder (1843–1902), American soldier and Medal of Honor recipient
- Charles LaFayette Reeder (1862–1926), American politician and physician, mayor of Tulsa
- Charles Joseph "Joe" Reeder II (c. 1927–2026), owner of the Murray-Dick-Fawcett House
