= Robert H. Robinson Library =

Coordinates: 38°48′43″N 77°02′53″W

Robert H. Robinson Library was one of the earliest libraries for Colored People in the United States, during the Jim Crow laws era. Robert Robinson Library was located at 902 Wythe St., Alexandria, Virginia, and was operated since 1940 by the City of Alexandria.

== History ==
The library was named in honor of Rev. Robert H. Robinson, an African American minister, educator, and activist. He was the grandson of Caroline Branham, an enslaved women held by George and Martha Washington.

In 1939 sit-in at the new and "whites only" Alexandria, Virginia public library (Kate Waller Barret branch) organized by the lawyer Samuel Wilbert Tucker since the library's budget was collected from the taxes paid by every American citizen.

The original goal of Lawyer Samuel Wilbert Tucker was to allow African Americans to use Virginia's Public Library, but instead of it was built a small and segregated library—Robert Robinson Library. Its construction was completed in 1940 and functioned as the first "separate but equal" library for African Americans in the segregated city.

== Librarians and collection ==
Since the time of its foundation, its staff was formed by professional librarians who graduated from many American universities and the books were served to students of different levels from kindergarten up to university.

== Importance ==
The city's project followed a 1939 sit-in by African Americans and arrests at the whites-only Alexandria Library.

The 1939 event is commonly cited as the first non-violent protest by African Americans against racial segregation.

== Current status ==
Since the libraries were desegregated, Robert H. Robinson Library became part of the Alexandria Black History Museum.

The museum has changing exhibitions on local and national topics related to African Americans.

The museum also operates the Alexandria African American Heritage Park, a 9-acre (3.6 ha) park at 500 Holland Lane, which contains a 1-acre (0.40 ha) nineteenth-century African-American cemetery that was buried under a city landfill in the 1960s.

== See also ==
- Contrabands and Freedmen Cemetery
- Franklin and Armfield Office
- Alexandria Black History Museum
- Frederick Douglass National Historic Site
- National Museum of African American History and Culture
- National Museum of African Art
- Anacostia Community Museum
- Founders Library
- List of museums focused on African Americans
