= Magnus Lewis Robinson =

American newspaper editor (1852–1918)

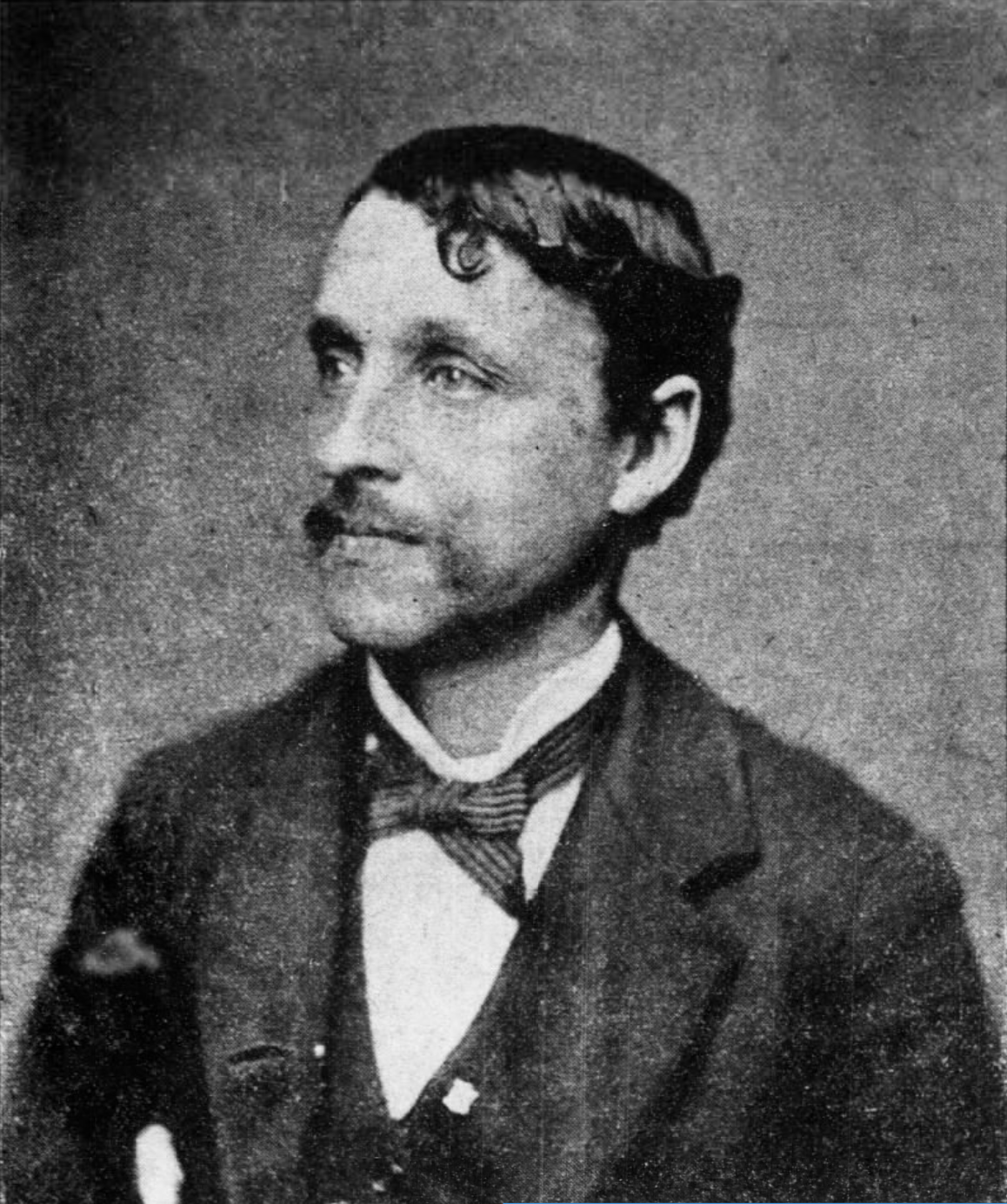
- Born: November 21, 1852; Alexandria, Virginia, United States
- Died: August 17, 1918 (aged 65); Washington, D.C., United States
- Burial place: Bethel Cemetery, Alexandria, Virginia, United States
- Other names: M.L. Robinson
- Education: Howard University School of Law
- Occupation(s): Newspaper editor, journalist, politician, Black community leader
- Father: Robert H. Robinson
- Relatives: Caroline Branham (great grandmother)

Magnus Lewis Robinson (1852–1918) was an American newspaper editor, politician, and Black community leader. He was the managing editor, and co-owner of The Washington National Leader newspaper, which he founded with his brother. Robinson was active within the Republican Party in Virginia and Washington, D.C.; as well as Masonic organizations.

== Early life and education ==
Magnus Lewis Robinson was born on November 21, 1852, in Alexandria, Virginia. His father was Robert H. Robinson, a noted minister and Black rights activist; and his mother was Mary Ann Warwick. His paternal grandmother was Caroline Branham, a slave at Mount Vernon the plantation estate of President George Washington. He was educated privately. He apprenticed as a baker for four years.

Robinson attended law school in Washington, D.C. at the Howard University School of Law in 1868, but he did not graduate due to his poor health.

== Career ==
After leaving college, he worked as a teacher for a year. In his early career, Robinson contributed to newspapers, including The Baltimore Sun, Baltimore American, and The Lynchburg Daily News. He was the first African American reporter for the Baltimore Daily Bee. This was followed by founding the newspaper The Virginia Post in Harrisonburg, with his brother Robert (also known as R.B.).

In 1880, Robinson became the secretary of the Republican Committee of Rockingham County, Virginia, and he was the first African American in the role. He was also elected the secretary of the Charlottesville Congressional Convention in 1880. In 1881, he represented Rockingham County at the Colored State Convention in Petersburg, Virginia.

In 1888, Robinson and his brother R.B. started a new publication for African Americans in Washington, D.C. called The Washington National Leader (or The National Leader), to advocate Republican Party issues and candidates. In 1890, the paper was renamed The Weekly Leader, and it was moved from Washington, D.C. to Alexandria.

In 1889, Robinson was a defeated Republican candidate for alderman in Alexandria. He was the president of the Fredrick Douglass Library Association; and a leading member of the Colored National Press Convention. Robinson was a Past Master and Past Grand Junior Deacon of the Grand Lodge No. 2 in Virginia.

== Death and legacy ==
He died on August 17, 1918, in Washington, D.C., and he is buried at Bethel Cemetery in Alexandria.

A profile of Robinson is included in the book, The Afro-American Press and Its Editors (1891). A 1902 letter from Robinson to President Theodore Roosevelt is in the archives at the Theodore Roosevelt Center at Dickinson State University.
