= Alexandria Library =

Alexandria Library may refer to:

- Library of Alexandria, one of the largest libraries in ancient history
- Bibliotheca Alexandrina, a modern library in Alexandria, Egypt
- Alexandria Library (Virginia), a library in Alexandria, Virginia
