= Robert H. Robinson =

American Methodist minister (1824–1909)

Robert Henry Robinson
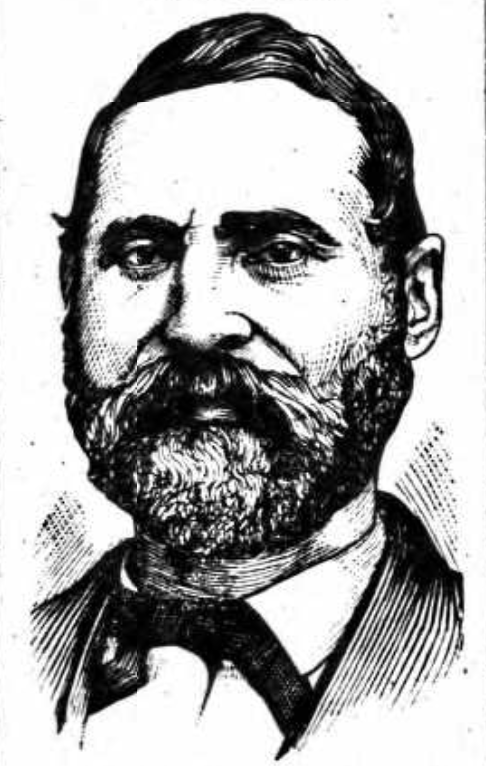
- Born: 1824; Virginia, United States
- Died: November 22, 1909 (aged 84–85); United States
- Occupations: Minister, educator, activist for the rights of African Americans
- Spouse: Mary Ann Warwick (m. 1847–)
- Children: 5, including Magnus Lewis Robinson
- Relatives: Caroline Branham (grandmother)

Rev. Robert Henry Robinson (1824–1909), was an American minister, educator, and an activist for the rights of African Americans during the Antebellum period in Arlington, Virginia. He was born into slavery, but through the negotiation by his grandmother, Caroline Branham, he was freed at age 21 after an eleven-year apprenticeship. He was a minister at Roberts Chapel, a Methodist Episcopal Church. He established a night school and debate team for black freedman. The Robert H. Robinson Library was named in his honor.

== Early life ==
Robinson was born into slavery. He was the son of Lucy Branham, and grandson of Caroline Branham. His slaveholder was George Washington Parke Custis, Martha Washington's grandson. In the 1820s, Caroline agreed to participate in lengthy interviews with historian Jared Sparks under the condition that Robinson was freed. He was sold to a Quaker named Miller in 1834. He was apprenticed to a banker and businessman from Arlington named Robert Jamieson. During this time, he learned to read and do arithmetic. He was freed in January 1846, at 21 years of age.

== Career ==
Robinson was ordained to the ministry by Bishop Matthew Simpson, who was Abraham Lincoln's spiritual adviser. He was a pastor of Roberts Chapel, a Methodist Episcopal Church established by African Americans, on South Washington Street in the city of Alexandria. He helped establish the Western Conference of the Methodist Episcopal Church; it was the first conference for African Americans. From 1872 to 1876, he was the first African member of the Board of Church Extension Society of the M.E. Church. In 1883, he moved to Charleston, West Virginia. By 1894, he was the minister of the McKendree M.E. Church in Cumberland, Maryland. Throughout his career, he was the minister to churches in the District of Columbia, Virginia, West Virginia, Pennsylvania, and Maryland.

He helped to create opportunities for black freedmen by opening a night school and a debate club. He was the treasurer of the William McKinley Normal and Industrial School in Alexandria.

In 1864, he and two of his sons organized the earliest Emancipation Day observances in the city for African Americans. The celebration attracted Booker T. Washington, Frederick Douglass, and John M. Langston.

== Personal life ==
Robinson was married on September 23, 1847. In 1888, Robinson's two sons established the African American political newspaper, The Washington National Leader, also called The Weekly Leader. R.B. (or Robert B.) was the business manager, and Magnus was the managing editor. Frederick Douglass Jr. was the associate editor.

He became the fourth Grand Master of the Freemasons for the District of Columbia in 1854. He became a Grand Master in West Virginia in the 1880s. In 1883, he was declared the "oldest living Past Grand Master of Masons of the District of Columbia, Universal Lodge".

== Death and legacy ==
He died on November 22, 1909. In 1911, a ten-foot high monument was erected for him at the Bethel Cemetery on South Payne Street in Alexandria, Virginia, by his two sons, Rev. R.B. Robinson and Magnus L. Robinson. His wife and sons were buried near him at the same cemetery.

The Robert H. Robinson Library of the Alexandria Black History Museum is named in his honor. He is named on the Truths that Rise from the Roots monument in Alexandria, Virginia.
