= Caroline Branham =

Slave at Mount Vernon

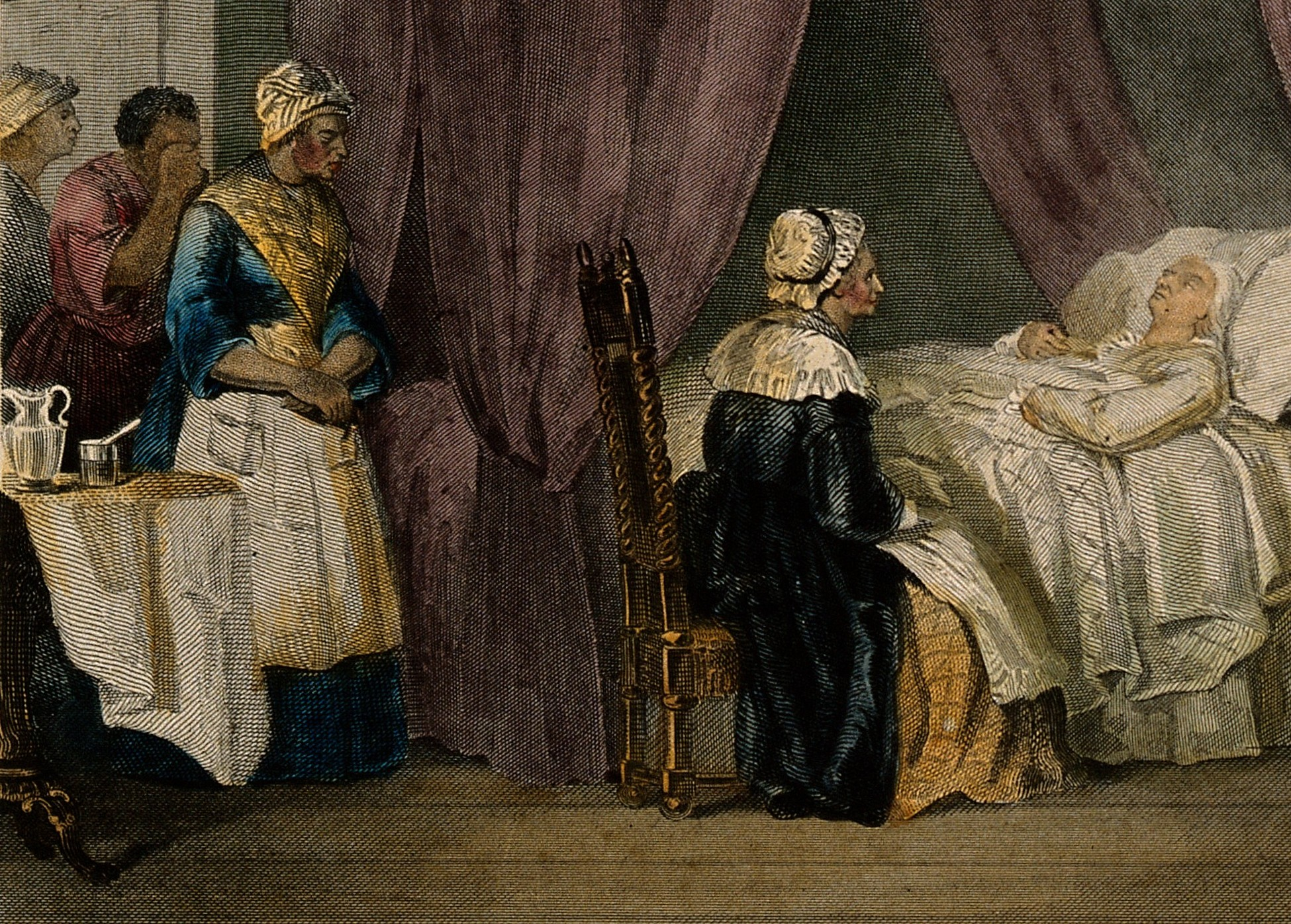
Caroline Branham was standing behind the foot of George Washington's death bed, 1799. Cropped from a colored engraving of Death of Washington.

Caroline Branham (c. 1764–1843) (Note: Her surname was also spelled Brannum.) was an enslaved housemaid and seamstress of George and Martha Washington. She was married to Washington's hired groomsman Peter Hardiman, whose slaveholder was David Stuart. (Note: Hardiman's surname was also spelled Hardman.) Branham gave birth to nine children, seven with Hardiman. (Note: There is also a source that states that she had six children.) Her son, Austin (1798–1879), and her ninth child, Lucy, are believed to have been a child of the plantation; the boy's and girl's father was George Washington Parke Custis. Branham served the Washington family and their many visitors, ensuring they resided comfortably.

She was at George Washington's bedside when he died in 1799 and with Martha when she died in 1802. After Martha's death, her enslaver was George Washington Parke Custis, Martha's grandson. In the 1820s, Jared Sparks interviewed her for his biography of Washington, which she did in exchange for the freedom of her grandson, a toddler at the time, Robert H. Robinson. He was freed at the age of 21 after eleven years of apprenticeship.

== Early life ==
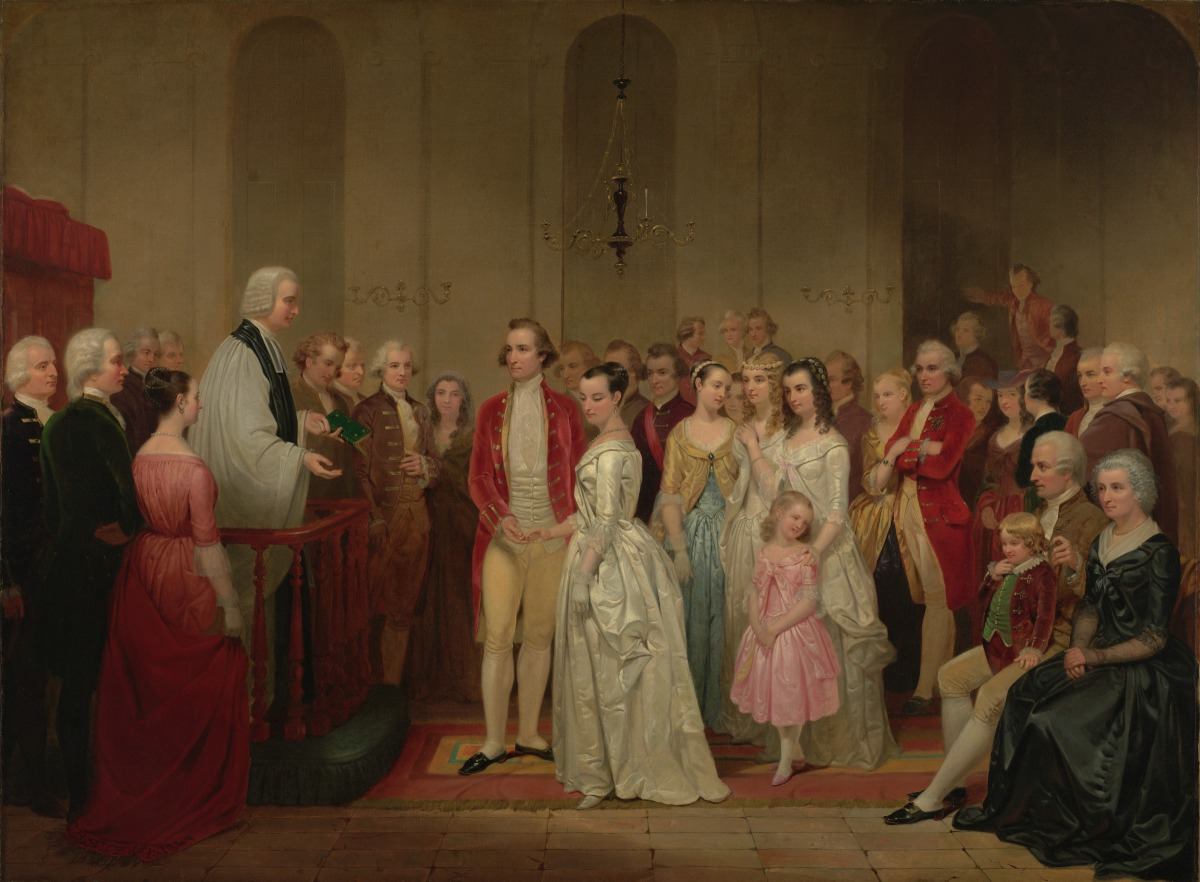
Junius Brutus Stearns, The Marriage of Washington to Martha Custis. The painting recreated the scene of the wedding on January 6, 1759. Made in 1849, the couple are depicted on the right. Behind them stand Martha's two surviving children—John Parke and Martha—from her first marriage to Daniel Parke Custis. George Washington adopted the children as his own.

Branham was born into slavery in 1764 at Mount Vernon. Her mother's enslaver was Daniel Parke Custis, who died in 1757 without having prepared a will. Martha received a life interest in one-third of his estate, including the enslaved people. Their two surviving children received two-thirds of the estate. Branham was then owned by the dower estate of Martha Washington. In practice, her slaveholders were George and Martha Washington after their marriage in 1759. Further Martha Washington § Dower slaves, estate, death, and interment

== Housemaid and seamstress ==
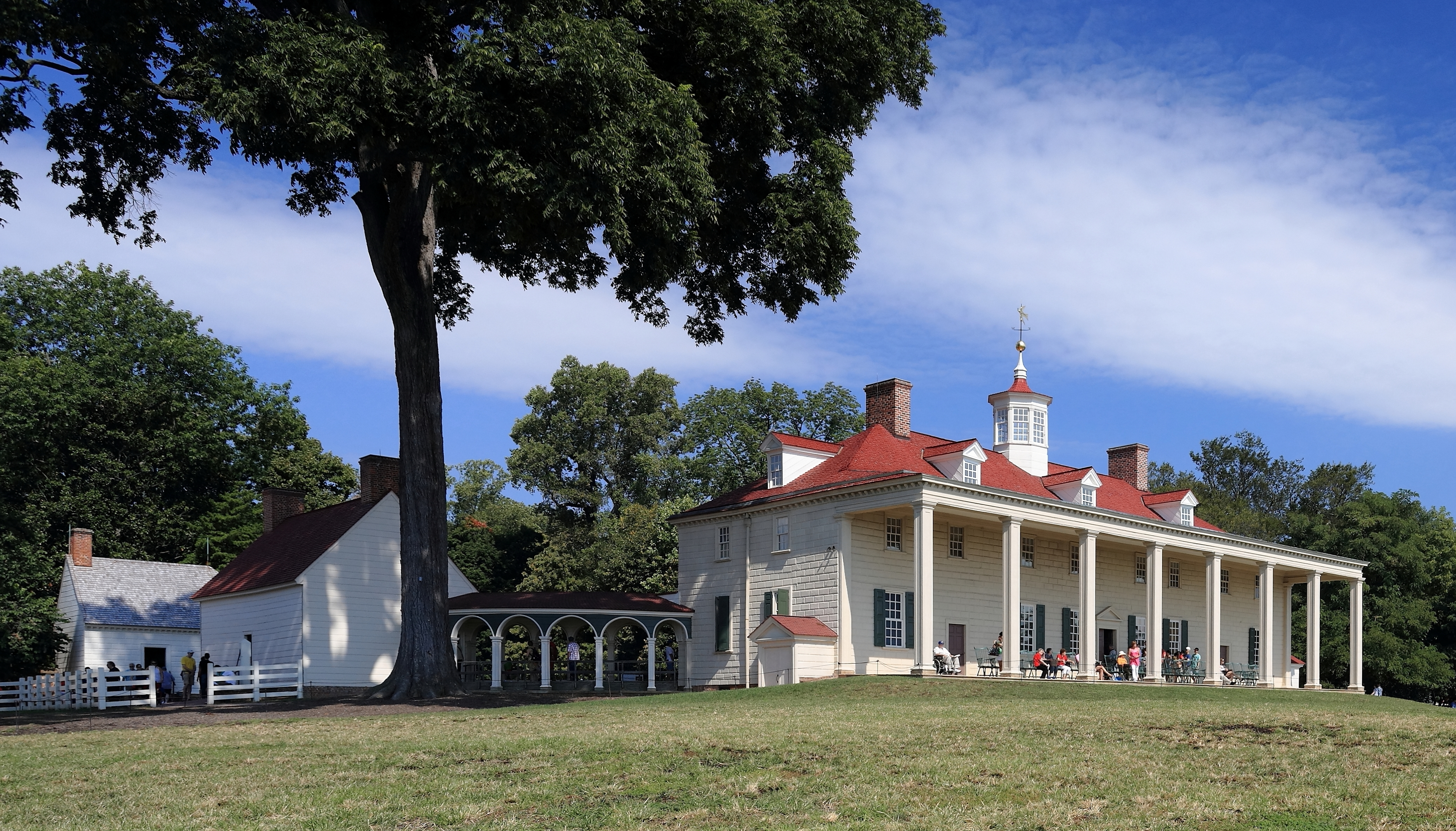
Mount Vernon Estate, Mount Vernon, Virginia

Branham began work each day before sunrise and worked after the sun went down. She and other housemaids, like Molly and Charlotte, were responsible for cleaning and maintaining the Washington's mansion and other buildings on the plantation. In the early morning, she lit fireplaces in the mansion to warm the rooms, including the occupied bed chambers, before the family and any guests awoke. Her work included: washing clothes and linens, dusting furniture, cleaning floors, and other household duties. She cared for family members and visitors, which included using bed warmers on cold nights, providing jugs of water for washing, emptying chamber pots, lighting fires and candles, and making beds. A house bell system, built in the 1780s, summoned domestic workers to the piazza, dining rooms, or bedrooms. At times Branham coordinated activities, such as readying the mansion when the Washingtons returned to the plantation from Philadelphia.

I beg you will make Caroline put all the things of every kind out to air and Brush and Clean all the places and rooms that they were in…

— Martha Washington to her niece Fanny, June 1794

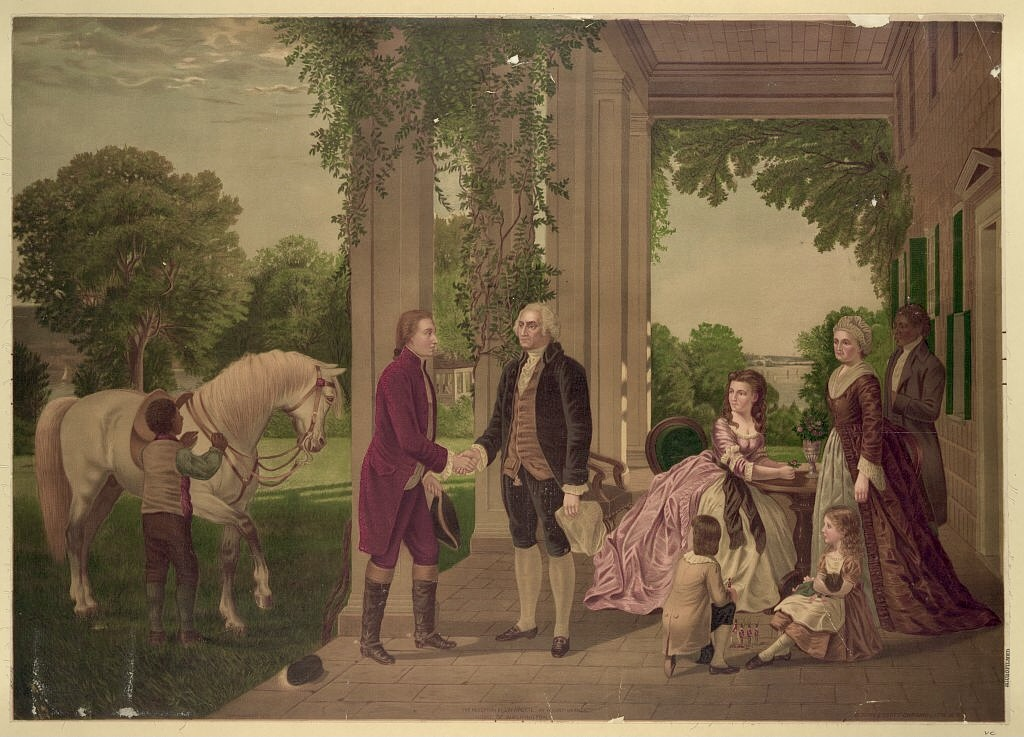
George Washington welcoming Marquis de Lafayette to his home at Mount Vernon

On the first, second, and third floors, bed chambers were frequented by visiting relatives, friends, and strangers. Washington claimed that Mount Vernon was a "well resorted tavern" with overnight guests two-thirds of the time. He said, "scarcely any strangers who are going from north to south, or from south to north do not spend a day or two at it." Washingtons provided luxurious accommodations with furniture, china, soap, wine, cheese, and other foods from Europe. House maids prepared bed chambers for visitors with fresh linens and jugs of water for washing. They emptied chamber pots and wash basins.

External videos
- George Washington's Enslaved Housemaid: Caroline Branham
- The Slaves' Stories: Caroline Branham
- Talking With An Enslaved Housemaid (Caroline Branham) At Mount Vernon

Branham was also a seamstress who made clothing for the Washingtons' enslaved people. The women who worked in the mansion, like Branham, wore ankle-length gowns made of inexpensive fabric. They would also wear aprons, shoes with buckles, stockings, a type of corset, and caps over their hair if they interacted regularly with family members and visitors.

Branham practiced passive resistance at times for being enslaved. She worked slower and did not meet production quotas. The Washingtons threatened to make her work in the fields, but they never did. They valued and relied upon their highly skilled household workers and worried about angering her and other enslaved people. While the enslavers had power over their lives, Caroline and other valued enslaved people were sometimes able to negotiate for better conditions for themselves and their children.

Washington was always concerned that others were taking advantage of him. He was concerned that Caroline kept pieces of fabric (for mending clothes and for quilts) and that Hardiman took longer than needed when traveling between the five farms on Mount Vernon.

=== Washington household ===
At the time of George and Martha's marriage, Martha had two surviving children — John ("Jacky") Parke Custis (1754–1781) and Martha ("Patsy") Parke Custis (1756–1773) — who became George Washington's stepchildren. Patsy died when she was a teenager. Jacky married Eleanor Calvert in 1774. They established themselves at Abington plantation, and they had three daughters and a son. When he came of age, John Parke Custis (1754–1781) received a large inheritance from his father, Daniel Parke Custis's (1711–1757) estate, and became Hardiman's enslaver. Jacky died in 1781. Eleanor inherited her husband's estate for her lifetime. Hardiman drove Eleanor from Abington plantation to Mount Vernon to visit Martha and George. During those visits, Hardiman met Caroline, and they fell in love. Initially, they could only see each other during Eleanor's visits to Mount Vernon.

Eleanor married Daniel Stuart in 1783. Her two oldest children, Elizabeth Parke Custis and Martha Parke Custis lived with the Stuarts. Eleanor Parke Custis and George Washington Parke Custis went to live with George and Martha Washington.

From 1775 to 1783, George Washington was Commander of the Continental Army and was away from Mount Vernon. Further George Washington in the American Revolution

In 1789, George Washington was inaugurated President of the United States. The Washingtons visited Mount Vernon occasionally over his eight-year presidency.

=== Making Mount Vernon self-sufficient ===
After George Washington's resignation as commander-in-chief in 1783, he returned to Mount Vernon determined to maintain the estate after his eight-year absence and to make Mount Vernon self-supporting. This meant he wanted to produce everything he could on the plantation. He rented or hired enslaved or indentured servants if a specific skill set was needed. Mount Vernon operated corn and wheat mills and a blacksmith shop where iron tools were made. Bricks, buckets, and barrels were made on the grounds. Thread was made and woven into fabric, then sewn into clothing by sewists. Leather was tanned, and shoes were made. Fish was harvested in the mid to late-spring. The plantation also operated a dairy and distillery and had a staff of carpenters. Washington contracted for Hardiman to establish himself at Mount Vernon and oversee breeding and maintaining horses.

=== George Washington's death ===
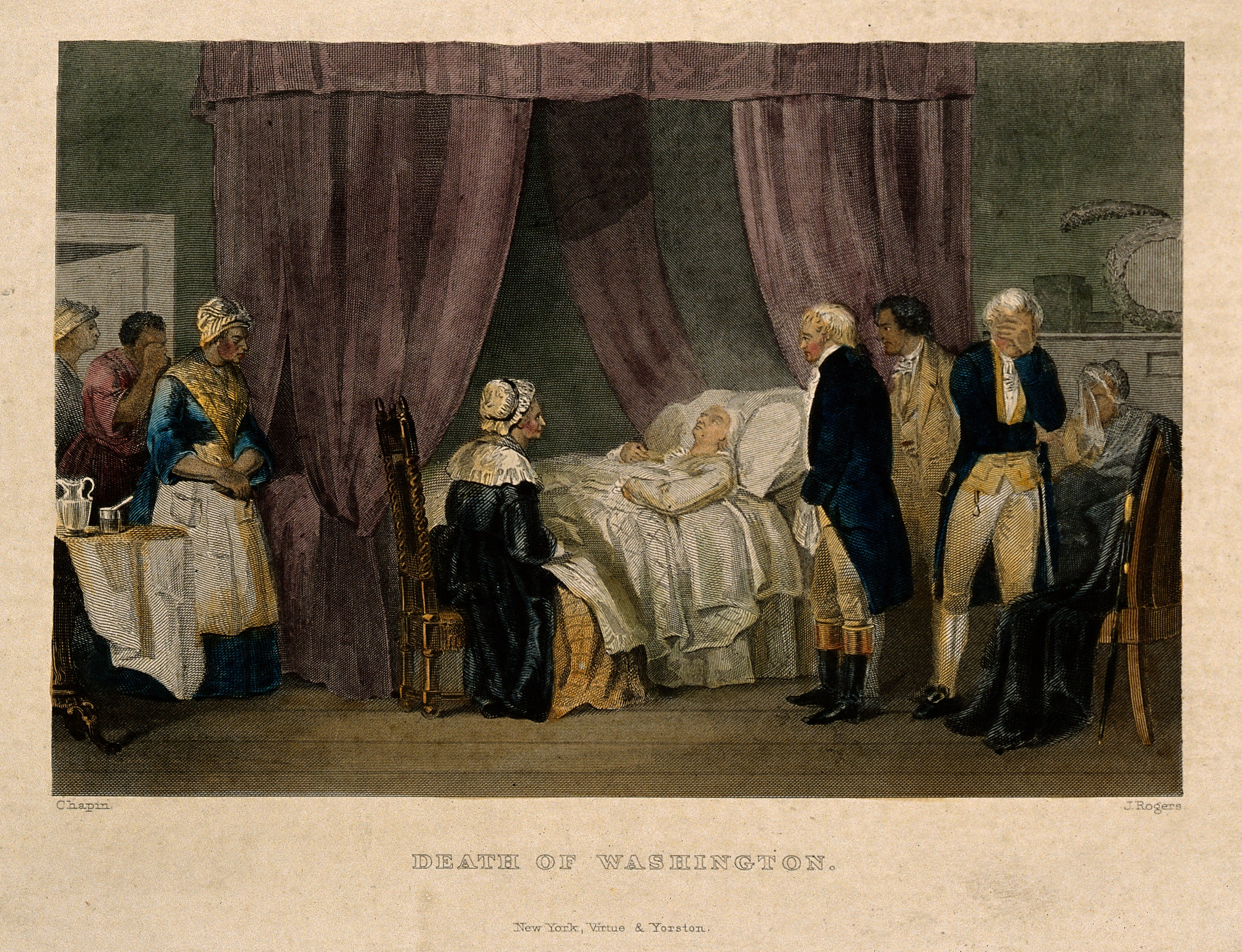
Death of Washington, colored engraving by John Rodgers after John R. Chapin, 1799, Amon Carter Museum of American Art. From Tobias Lear's diary account: "Mrs Washington was sitting near the foot of the bed... Caroline, Molly & Charlotte were in the room standing near the door."

Washington became gravely ill on December 14, 1799, and died in the evening. Washington's lawyer, Tobias Lear recorded that Branham and three other enslaved people were in his room when he died. In an engraving of Washington's death bed, Branham is depicted behind the foot of the bed. Her eldest son, Wilson, had become a groomsman. He was about 14 when he led Washington's riderless horse in the December 18, 1799 funeral procession.

At the time of his death, there were 317 enslaved people at the Mount Vernon estate. Under his will, 123 of the people that he enslaved were to be manumitted upon Martha's death. Martha decided to manumit the enslaved people early and signed a deed of manumission in December 1800, and they were freed on January 1, 1801.

There were 153 enslaved people that Martha brought to the marriage who remained enslaved. Branham and her children were dower slaves. Washington had wanted to free the enslaved people of the Custis estate, but he was prevented by a law regarding dower slaves, and he was unable to find buyers for the dower slaves.

=== Martha's maid ===
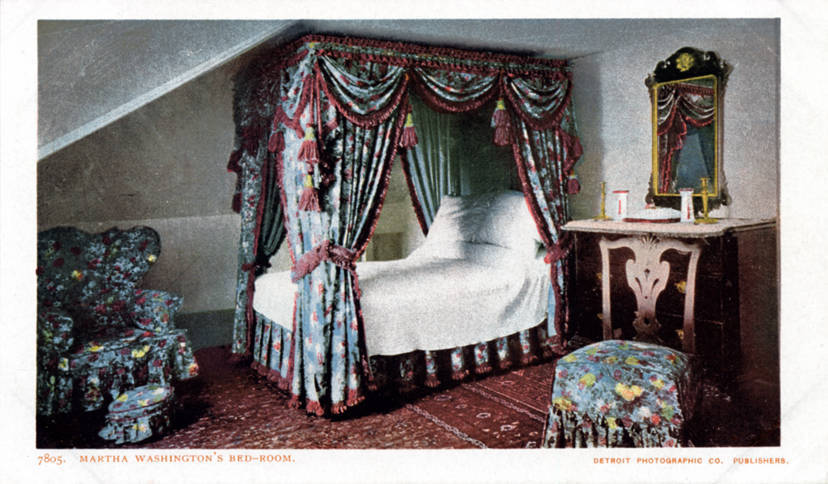
Martha Washington's Bed Room. Following George Washington's death in 1799, Martha moved from their shared bedroom on the second floor to a bed chamber on the third floor, where she spent most of her time until she died in 1802.

Martha oversaw the work of the domestic servants, which included locking and unlocking the kitchen and storerooms to prevent theft at night and checking on the work performed in the mansion. Branham was Martha's personal maid and was with her when she died. Upon Martha's death, the dower slaves were divided up amongst her grandchildren (her daughters and son were all deceased by the time of her death).

=== Arlington House ===
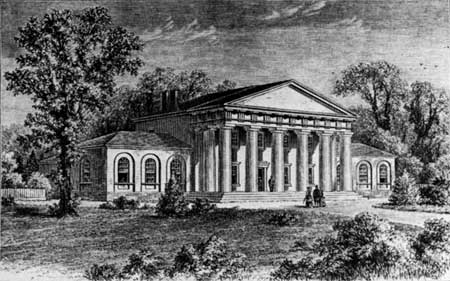
Arlington House from a pre-1861 sketch, published in 1875

Martha Washington died in 1802. Branham and their children, as well as Peter Hardiman, were inherited by Martha's grandson, George Washington Parke Custis. (Note: Hardiman may not have come to Arlington House at the same time as Branham and their children.) Hardiman oversaw the care of Custis's horses, mules, and donkeys.

The Branham–Hardiman family lived in a cottage on the Arlington House estate. (Note: Among the people who lived at Arlington House were Caroline, Austin, Rachel, Lucy Branham, and Lucy's son Robert. There was also a Marcellena and Alimira Branham.) Christopher Sheels also went to Arlington House from Mount Vernon.

Around 1806, Branham gave birth to a daughter named Lucy whose father was likely Custis, based upon scholarship performed for the Mount Vernon exhibit Lives Bound Together. Custis's daughter Mary Anna married Robert E. Lee in 1831 at Arlington House when Branham lived there. Branham lived at Arlington House until her death in 1843.

== Personal life ==
=== Marriage to Peter Hardiman ===
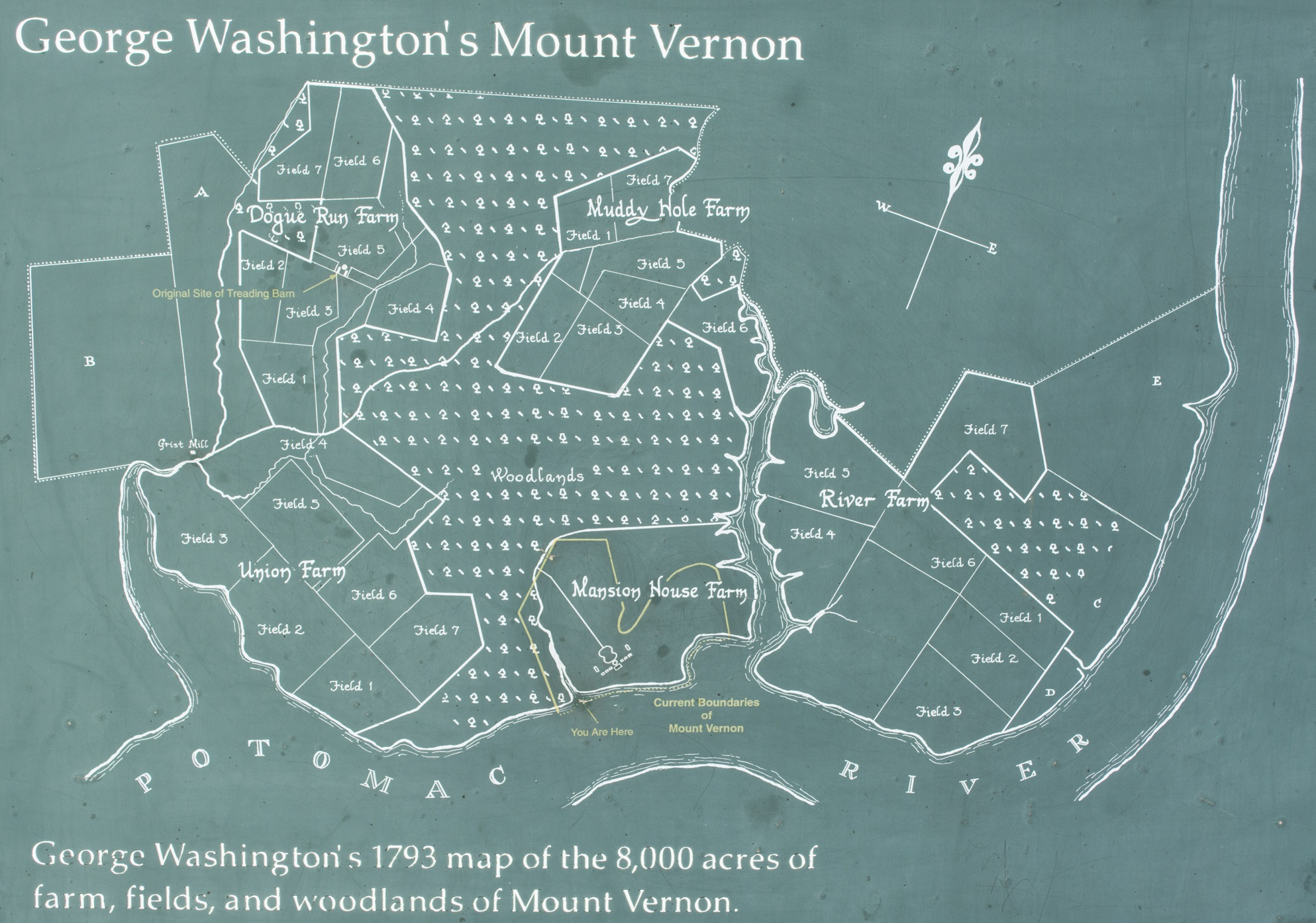
Map of Mount Vernon plantation. Branham worked at the Mansion House Farm (lower center), one of five farms on the Mount Vernon estate. Hardiman and, later, their son Wilson worked at the stables located just south and west of the mansion. The other farms on the plantation were River Farm, Muddy Hole Farm, Doque Run Farm, and Union Farm.

External images
- Article with image and map of Mount Vernon stables
- Image of Mount Vernon stables, description including Peter Handiman

By 1787, she was married to Washington's groom Peter Hardiman, whose slaveholder was David Stuart. Hardiman was rented to Washington by 1785 and the arrangement was extended in 1788 to pay £12 per year to Stuart. Washington negotiated for Hardiman to care for his "Jacks, Stud Horses, Mares, etc." Managing the stables for Washington meant that Hardiman would live with his wife and children at Mount Vernon.

He handled the racehorses, including Magnolia, an Arabian purebred stallion, and Leonida, also a purebred. Washington lent Hardiman to his friend William Fitzhugh to prepare his horse Tarquin for a race in the autumn of 1785. Fitzhugh implied that the horse had won the race in his thank you letter to Washington. Washington desired to breed quality mules because they made good farm animals, but there were few good donkeys in the country then. In 1785, he received a donkey named Royal Gift from the King Charles III of Spain. He received another from the Marquis de Lafayette named Knight of Malta. Hardiman then ran the large-scale mule breeding operation for Washington. He also bred horses. He oversaw the stable operations. He managed the health of the animals, such as during an outbreak of distemper among the Pennsylvania mares and young mules and colts in 1790. Besides the Washingtons' equines, Hardiman took care of visitor's horses. Other enslaved workers fed and groomed and aided in the breeding of animals. They also cleaned saddles and harnesses. Manure was collected and used as fertilizer on the farm.

=== Children ===
By 1788, the couple had two toddlers, Wilson and Rachel. They later had a total of eight children, which also included Jemima, Leanthe, Polly, Peter, Austin, and Daniel. Her ninth child, Lucy, likely sired by Custis, was born about 1806 and bore a resemblance to Custis's daughter Mary. (Note: Lucy's married surname was Harrison.) Custis also had children with Arianna Carter, another enslaved woman.

Like other enslaved people, Branham and Hardiman were considered the property of their enslavers. Enslaved mothers' children were born into slavery; they were the property of their mother's enslaver (per partus sequitur ventrem). Until they were eleven years of age, children occupied the work day by playing and looking after one another. They completed chores assigned by their parents. Branham's and Charlotte's children were known to play in the yard by the mansion. To protect the landscaping, Washington moved enslaved people further away from the mansion into the greenhouse complex by 1793; thereafter, only the cook and butler's children could play in the mansion yard. Washington forced enslaved children to begin working on Mount Vernon once they were 11.

=== Negotiation to free grandson ===
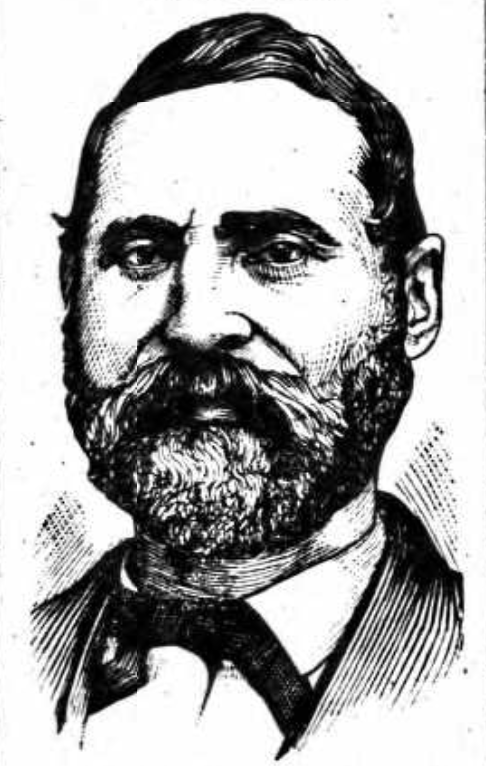
Rev. Robert H. Robinson, Branham's and George Washington Parke Custis's grandson (1824–1909)

In the 1820s, Branham agreed to in-depth interviews with historian Jared Sparks on the condition that her grandson Robert H. Robinson, a toddler at the time, was to be freed. Sparks was conducting research for his biography of Washington. (He was later president of Harvard College.) Robert, Lucy's son, was purchased in 1827 by Robert H. Miller, who was a Quaker. In 1834, he was apprenticed for eleven years to Robert Jamieson, who was a baker and businessman in Arlington. The 21-year-old was freed in January 1846. The Robert H. Robinson Library was named for him.

=== Death ===
Caroline Branham died in 1843. She was buried on March 13, 1843, in Alexandria, Virginia, in the graveyard of Christ Church. Although her name is recorded in the records of Christ Church under "burial of blacks", at the time there was no marker for her grave or any other African American.

== Popular culture ==
Branham was portrayed in two documentaries I Ain't No Three Fifths of a Person: Slavery and the Constitution and Hear My Story: The Enslaved Community at Mount Vernon.

== See also ==
- George Washington and slavery
- List of enslaved people of Mount Vernon
