= Elisha C. Dick =

American physician (1762–1825)

Elisha Cullen Dick
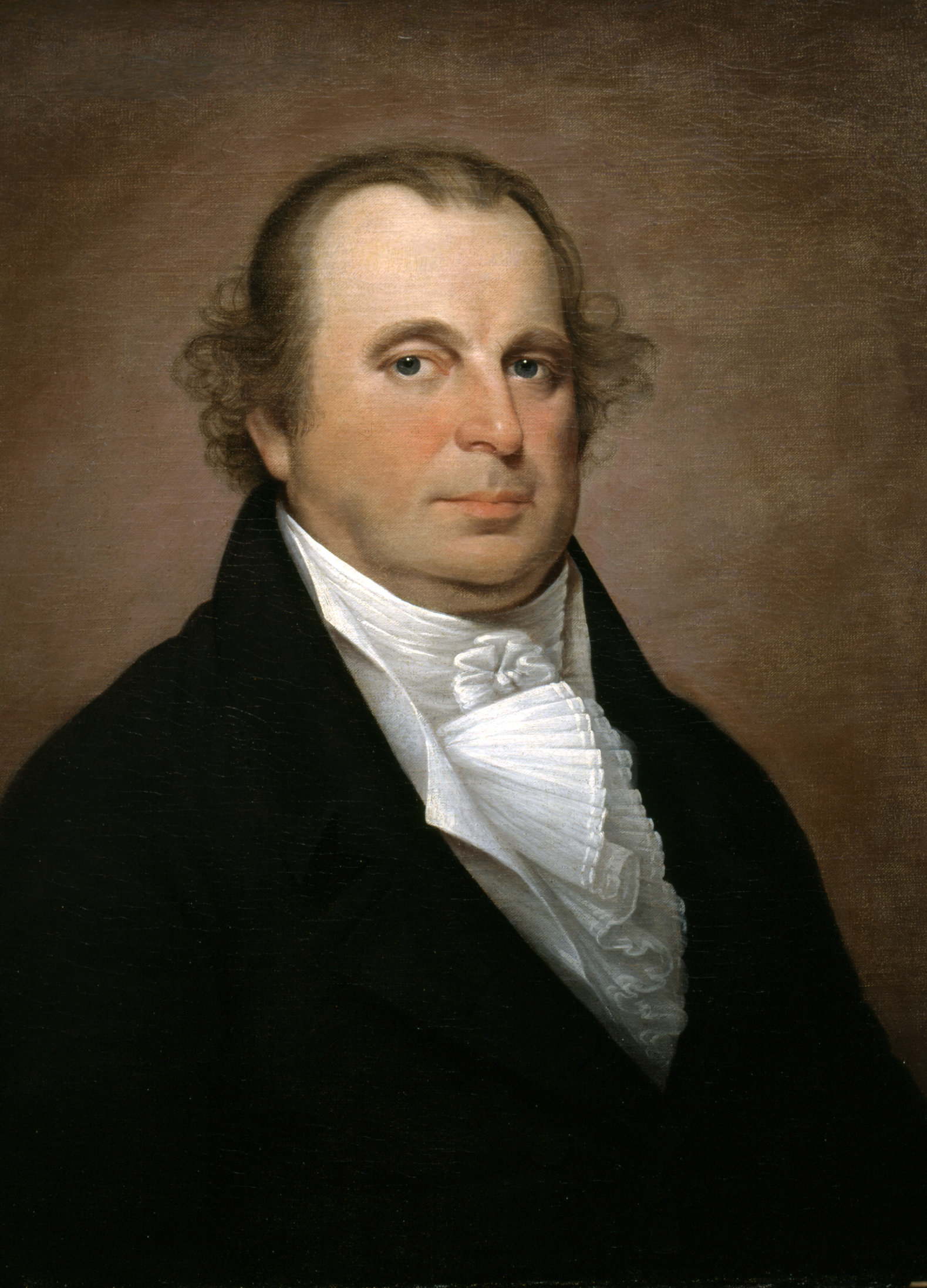
- portrait by Cephas Thompson

Member of the Virginia House of Delegates from Fairfax County
- In office December 1795 – November 7, 1796 Serving with Charles Lee
- Preceded by: Samuel Arell
- Succeeded by: Dr. Augustine Jaquelin Smith

Mayor of Alexandria, D.C.
- In office 1804-1805

Personal details
- Born: Elisha Cullen Dick; March 15, 1762 Chester County, Pennsylvania
- Died: September 22, 1825 (aged 63) Cottage Farm, Alexandria, D.C.
- Resting place: Quaker Burying Ground, Alexandria, Virginia (now Barrett branch library)
- Education: Perelman School of Medicine at the University of Pennsylvania
- Occupation: Physician, politician

Elisha Cullen Dick, M.D. (March 15, 1762 – September 22, 1825) was a Virginia medical doctor and political figure. He was the attending medical doctor at George Washington's death. Dick at times represented Fairfax County in the Virginia House of Delegates and served as mayor of Alexandria, D.C.

== Family ==
His father, Archibald Dick (b. 1715 Edinburgh – 1782), became a Major in the Revolutionary army, under Assistant Quartermaster General Frazer. His mother was Mary Barnard and he had a brother, Thomas Barnard Dick.

After graduating from medical school in Philadelphia, as described below, Elisha Dick married Hannah Harmon (1763–1843), the daughter of Jacob and Sarah Harmon of Marcus Hook, Chester County, Pennsylvania, reported to have been Quakers. They a son Archibald B. Dick, and a daughter Julia Dick, Archibald married Sarah S. Hamersley (d. 1848). Julia married Gideon Pearce, and they had two children, James Alfred Pearce (1805–1862), and Ann Ophelia (1807–1866), who married Dabney M. Wharton.

== Life ==
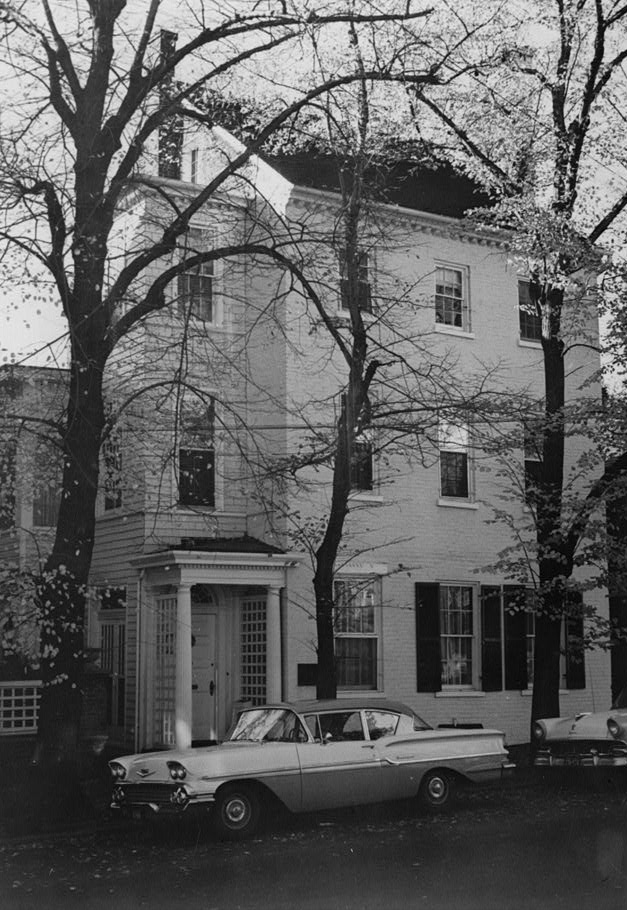
Dick-Janney House, 408 Duke Street

Elisha Dick studied with Benjamin Rush, and William Shippen, and graduated from the University of Pennsylvania School of Medicine in 1782.

Dick sold his half of his father's legacy, Marcus Hook property for £985, to Isaac Dutton on April 29, 1783.

Not long after their October 1793 marriage, Dick and his wife settled in Alexandria, where he took over the practice of the ailing William Rumney. Thomas Semmes read medicine with him. In 1794, he commanded a cavalry company during the Whiskey Rebellion. On July 24, 1794, he was among the founders of the Alexandria Library Company.

In 1794, he purchased a home at 517 Prince Street in Alexandria.

He lived at 408 Duke Street in Alexandria, which he bought from Elizabeth Muir Donaldson for £2,169. On June 8, 1796, he insured the home, with the Mutual Assurance Society. The house was brick, 32 by 24 feet (7.3 m), and one story high; the house stood between his vacant ground on the east and the west. Outbuildings consisted of a wood kitchen, a wood stable, and a brick smokehouse, the whole valued at $3,700. He used a trust on the home for loans totaling $6,082.

Dick is known to have been an amateur painter as well as a physician. A portrait by him of George Washington, dating to around 1800 and possibly after an original by James Sharples, is owned by the Mount Vernon Ladies' Association.

== Political career ==
When Samuell Arell died, Fairfax County voters elected Dick replaced him for the rest of his term in the Virginia House of Delegates in 1794, and he served alongside fellow Alexandrian and former attorney for President Washington Charles Lee, since both also owned property in Fairfax County south of Alexandria (then in the District of Columbia).

Dick became Superintendent of yellow fever Quarantine at Alexandria, and corresponded with Governor James Wood, on October 10, 1798.

He was appointed to the Republican Party Committee of Correspondence, in Virginia 1800, along with Roger West, Francis Peyton, Thompson Mason, and Walter Jones, Jr, and he escorted Thomas Jefferson to an election celebration at Gadsby's Tavern, at March 1801. In 1804 Charles Lee was elected as mayor of Alexandria, then in the District of Columbia, but refused to serve, so Elisha C. Dick was selected instead.

In the wake of Gabriel's Rebellion, Elisha C. Dick said abolition societies tended to produce "the most serious calamities." Writing to Governor James Monroe, Dick called for:

immediate legislative measures ... to restrain if not entirely suppress the schools supported by [antislavery advocates, who] are constantly inculcating natural equality among the blacks of every description[;] they are teaching them with great assiduity the only means by which they can at any time be enabled to concert and execute a plan of general insurrection.

At the time of the District of Columbia Organic Act of 1801, he was chairman of a local committee, petitioning the Congress about local government of the District of Columbia.

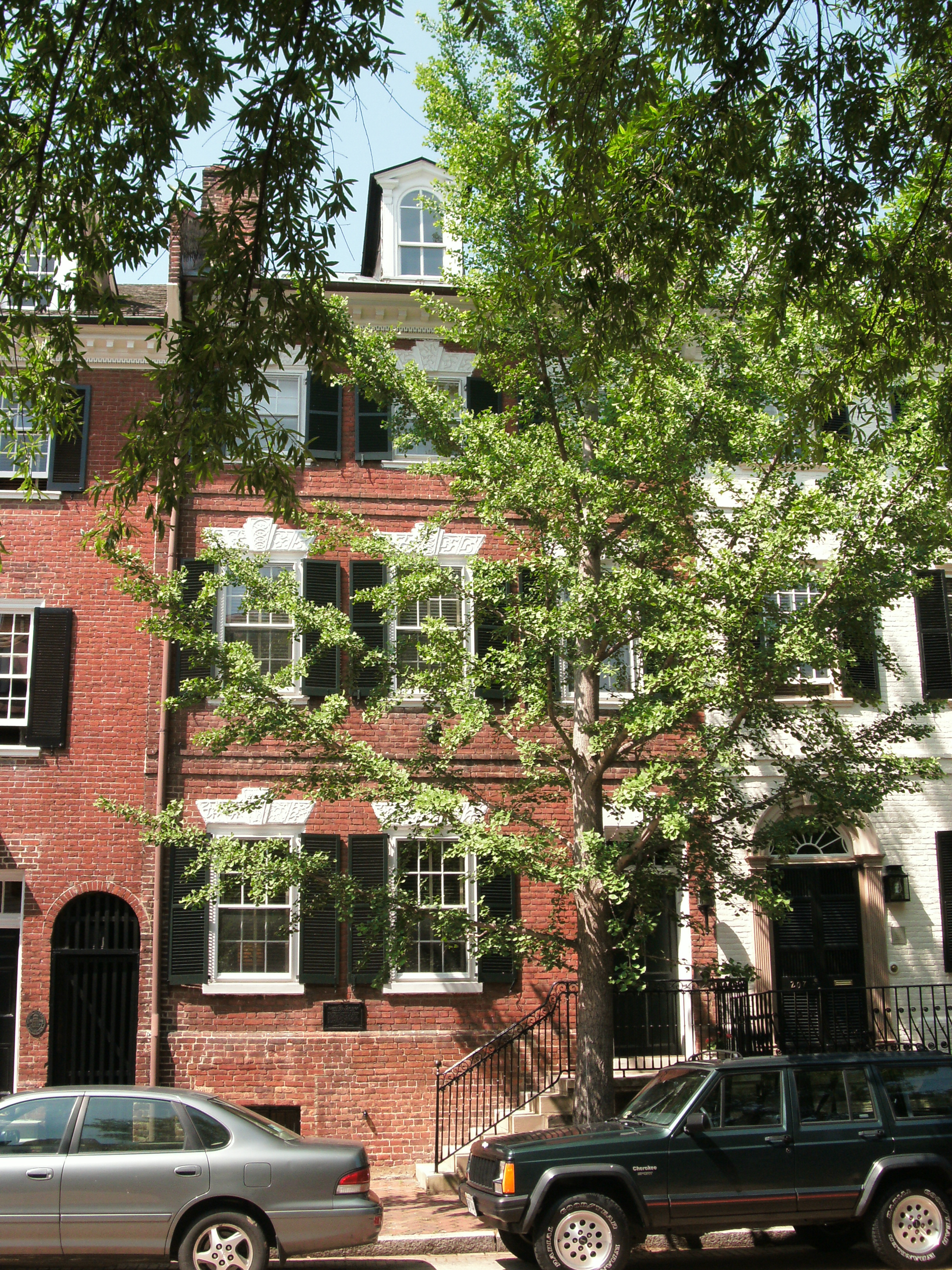
The house at 211 Prince St., which Dick rented

Elisha Dick also speculated in real estate. In 1801, he went bankrupt and lost his home at Duke Street in Alexandria. He then rented a house at 211 Prince Street from the widow Mary Harper. Despite his financial woes, voters considered him a worthy citizen, and he became justice of the peace and coroner in 1802.

From 1804 to 1805, he was Mayor of Alexandria, D.C., (now Va.) In 1804, he wrote the speaker of the House of Representatives, opposing retrocession.

On April 10, 1807, along with Cuthbert Powell, Dick was appointed Magistrate of the Alexandria Court by the Mayor of Alexandria, Jonah Thompson.

Ferdinando Fairfax left him $1,000, and his son Archibald $500, in his will.

Although raised as an Anglican, he joined the Society of Friends, Alexandria Meeting on February 20, 1812. Following Quaker precepts, he manumitted a slave.

In 1814, Dick was among the Alexandria delegation to Admiral Cockburn, after the Burning of Washington, during the War of 1812.

== Cottage Farm ==
Dick retired to Cottage Farm, on the Columbia Turnpike (now Lincolnia Road Route 613), 5 miles (8.0 km) west of Alexandria, along the Little River Turnpike. In 1814, Dick bought 80 acres (320,000 m^{2}) for $1.26($19.35 in 2025) per acre from Thomas Summers; in 1817, he bought 90 3/4 acres for $1.26 per acre from Thomas Wilson. In 1820, the tax rolls show he had 80 acres (cleared) worth $20($460.70 in 2025) per acre, and a house worth $2,060($47,454 in 2025). The house was torn down in 1952.

== Death ==
In July 1825 he resigned from the Quakers. There had been some controversy regarding his non-attendance at Meeting. At this time he was living at Cottage Farm and perhaps too ill—just two months before his death—to travel to town.

Elisha Cullen Dick died September 22, 1825, at his property Cottage Farm. His casket was placed on a funeral wagon and carried to Alexandria, where he was buried in an unmarked grave in the Friends Burying Ground on Queen Street. A plaque to him remains at the site, now the Barrett branch of the Alexandria Library. His inventory of medical paraphernalia was 9 pages long, and brought $461.51 at auction January 13, 1826.

== Works ==
- "Nursing and Lying in of Women, with some remarks concerning the treatment of newborn infants", Alexandria Gazette, February 28, 1798
- "Yellow Fever at Alexandria", New York Medical Repository, Vol. i, 1803
- "Facts and Observations about the Disease Cynanche Trachealis, or Croup", Philadelphia Medical and Physical Journal, Vol. iii, p. 242, 1808

== Masonic membership ==
He was a Mason, having been entered, passed and raised in Lodge No. 2 in Philadelphia and was a founding member of the Alexandria lodge. In 1789, Dick succeeded General Washington, as Worshipful Master of the Masonic Lodge No. 22, and as such laid the cornerstone of the District of Columbia, at Jones Point in Alexandria, in 1791. With his Lodge as Escort of Honor, he accompanied General Washington, and assisted in laying the cornerstone of the National Capitol in 1793. His duelling pistols are on display in the archives of the George Washington Masonic National Memorial in Alexandria.

== Dinner invitation ==
A celebrated dinner invitation written in rhyme by Dr. Elisha Cullen Dick:

If you can eat a good fat duck
Come up with us and take pot luck,
Of whitebacks we have got a pair
So plump, so round, so fat, & fair
A London Alderman would fight
Through pies and tarts to get one bite.
Moreover, we have beef or pork
That you may use your knife and fork.
Come up precisely at two o’clock
The door shall open at your knock.
The day tho’ wet, the streets tho’ muddy
To keep out the cold we'll have some toddy.
And if, perchance, you should get sick,
You'll have at hand

Yours E. C. Dick

This unusual missive was addressed to Philip Wanton, Dr. Dick's good friend, who lived at 216 Prince Street. The original invitation turned up some years ago in a treasure trunk in an old Alexandria attic. It is now on exhibit in the museum of the Stabler-Leadbeater Apothecary Shop.

== Washington's death ==
On December 12, 1799, George Washington spent several hours inspecting his farms on horseback, in snow and later hail and freezing rain. He sat down to dine that evening without changing his wet clothes. The next morning, he awoke with a bad cold, fever, and a throat infection called quinsy that turned into acute laryngitis and pneumonia. Washington died on the evening of December 14, 1799, at his home aged 67, while attended by Dr. James Craik, one of his closest friends, and Tobias Lear V, Washington's personal secretary. Lear would record the account in his journal, writing that Washington's last words were "'Tis well."

Discovering the case to be highly alarming, and foreseeing the fatal tendency of the disease, two consulting physicians were immediately sent for, Elisha Dick who arrived, at half after three, and Gustavus Richard Brown, at four o'clock in the afternoon: in the meantime were employed two pretty copious bleedings, a blister was applied to the part affected, two moderate doses of calomel were administered, which operated on the lower intestines, but all without any perceptible advantage, the respiration becoming still more difficult and distressing. Upon the arrival of the first of the consulting physicians, it was agreed, as there were yet no signs of accumulation in the bronchial vessels of the lungs, to try the result of another bleeding, when about thirty-two ounces of blood were drawn, without the smallest apparent alleviation of the disease. Vapours of vinegar and water were frequently inhaled, ten grains of calomel were given, succeeded by repeated doses of emetic tartar, amounting in all to five or six grains, with no other effect than a copious discharge from the bowels.

I pronounced decisively that death was inevitable, unless it could be arrested by the operation of tracheotomy, to which I strenuously recommended an immediate resort, as the only expedient that could possibly preserve the life of a man, whose loss every virtuous man in the community would deplore. " (Then Dr Dick goes on to discuss the unfavorable opinion of Drs. Craik and Brown.) "I know not what might have been the result and it would be presumption to pronounce upon it; but I shall never cease to regret that the operation was not performed."

Gustavus Brown later wrote to James Craik, January 21, 1800:

Sir: I have lately met Dr. Dick again in consultation and high opinion that I formed of him when we were in conference last month, concerning the situation Of our Illustrious friend, has been confirmed. You remember how, by his clear reasoning and evident knowledge of the cause of certain symptoms after the examination of the General, he assured us that it was not really quinsy, which we supposed it to be, but a violent inflammation of the membranes of the throat, which it had almost closed, and which if not immediately arrested would result in his death. You must remember he was averse to bleeding the General, and I have often thought that if we had acted accordingly to his suggestion, when he said, "he needs all his strength - bleeding will diminish it", and taken no more blood from him, our good friend might have been alive now. But we were governed by the best light we had: we thought we were right, and so we were justified.
