= Ellen Coolidge Burke =

American librarian and activist

- Born: May 10, 1901; Alexandria, Virginia
- Died: December 29, 1975 (aged 74); Alexandria, Virginia
- Education: Catholic University of America
- Occupation: Librarian

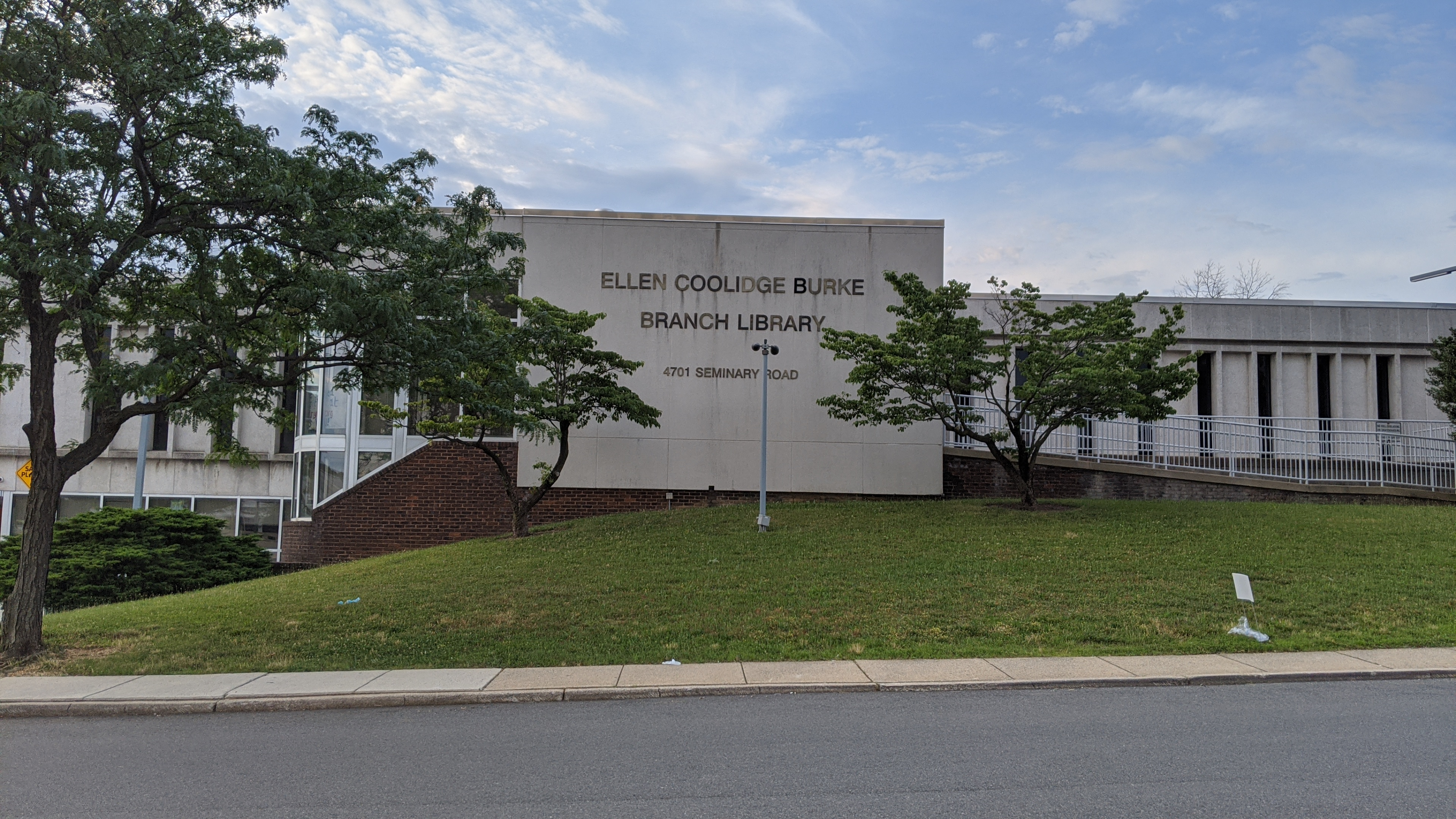
Ellen Coolidge Burke Branch Library

Ellen Coolidge Burke (May 10, 1901 – December 29, 1975) was an American librarian.

== Life ==
Burke was born in Alexandria, Virginia, to Henry Randolph Burke, and Rosella Gordon Trist. Burke's family was descended from Thomas Jefferson.

Burke gained her BA and MA at the Catholic University of America, Washington, D.C. She worked in the Alexandria Library for nearly a decade as cataloger and reference librarian, becoming director from 1948, until she retired in June 1969.

Burke brought bookmobile services to Alexandria, one of the first services in Virginia. She oversaw the growth of the library system by the addition of two new branch libraries. In April 1968 the Ellen Coolidge Burke Branch at 4701 Seminary Road was opened, and in December 1969 the James M. Duncan branch at 2501 Commonwealth Avenue.

Burke belonged to a number of professional library associations. She was an active member of the League of Women Voters and of the Urban League, as well as other civic groups.

Burke died on December 29, 1975, and is buried at Ivy Hill Cemetery, Alexandria.
