= John R. Chapin =

American artist

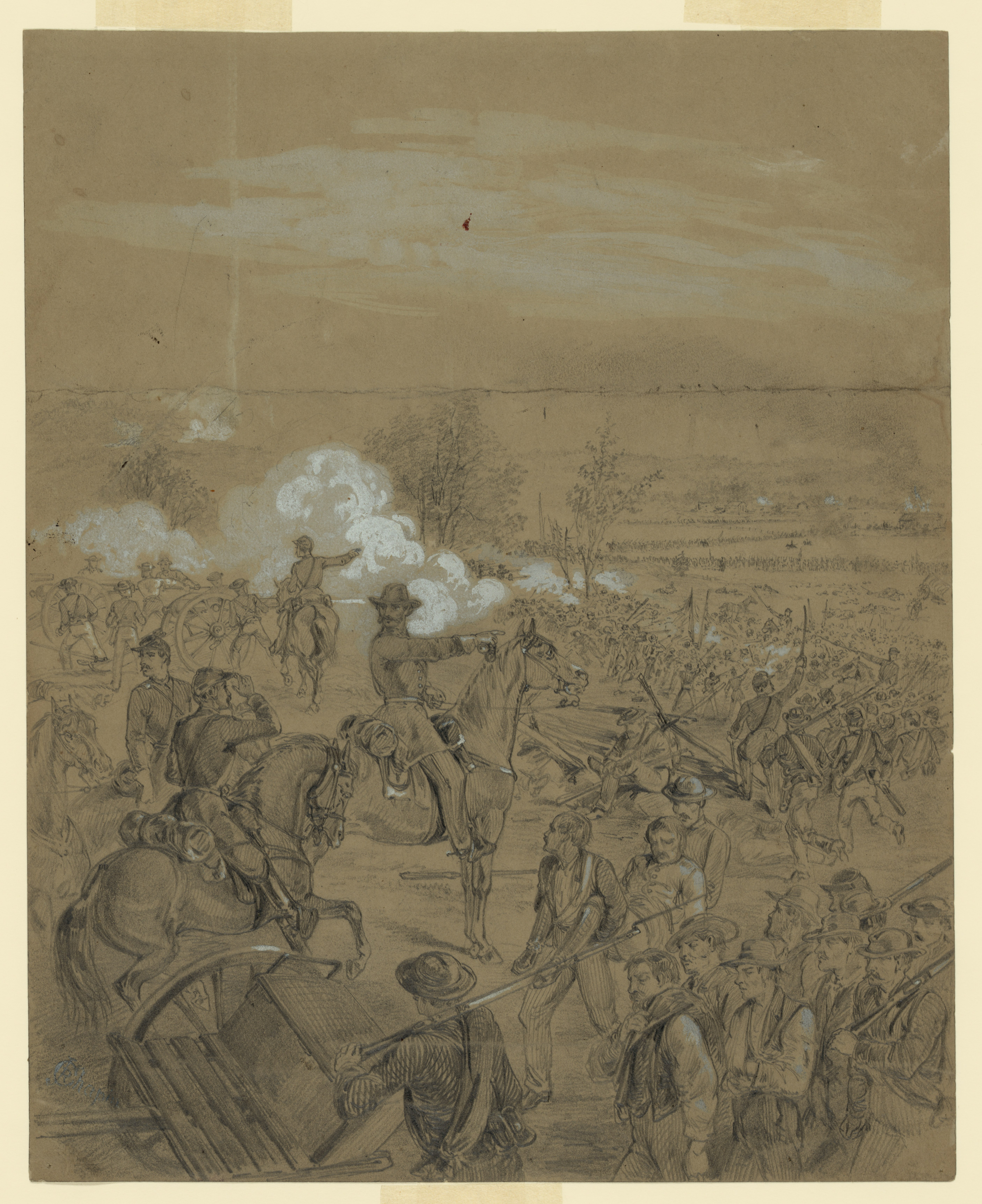
An officer directing his troops into battle in the American Civil War by John R. Chapin

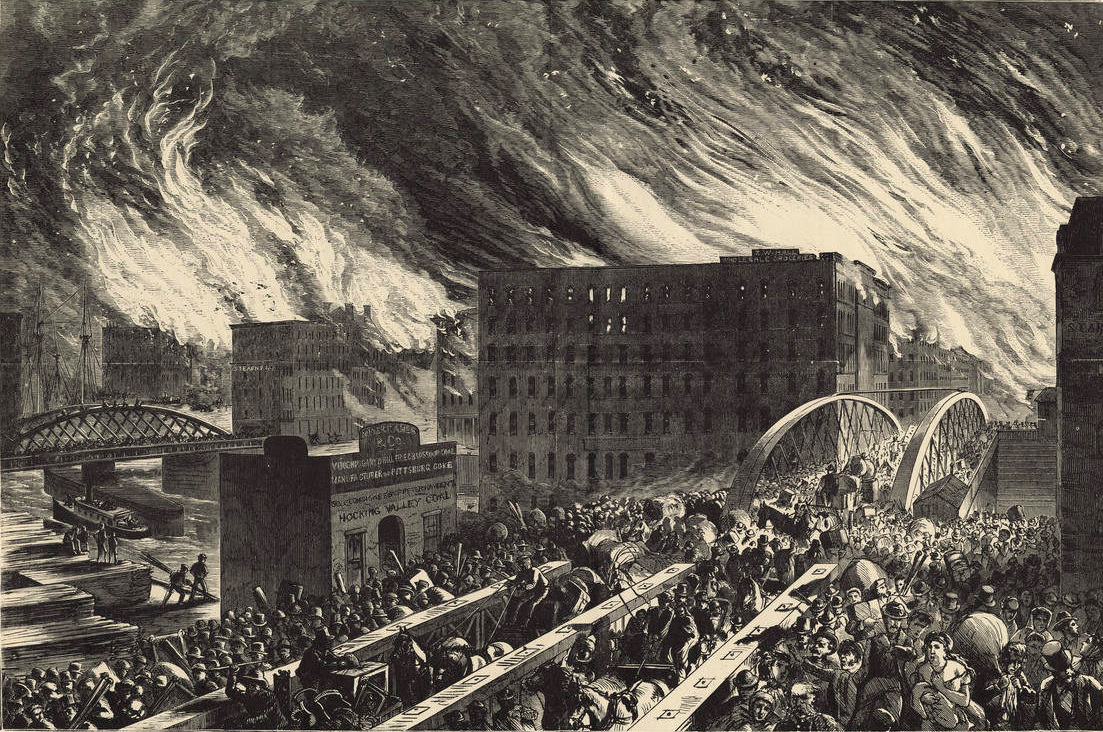
John R Chapin's rendering of the Great Chicago Fire, printed in Harper's Weekly

John R Chapin (1823–1907) was a 19th-century American artist and illustrator, who worked for Harper's Magazine. He was especially noted for a series of illustrations entitled Artist life in the highlands of New Jersey published in April 1860 which gave a realistic depiction of the daily life of miners.
