= Murray-Dick-Fawcett House =

House in Alexandria, Virginia

- U.S. Historic district – Contributing property
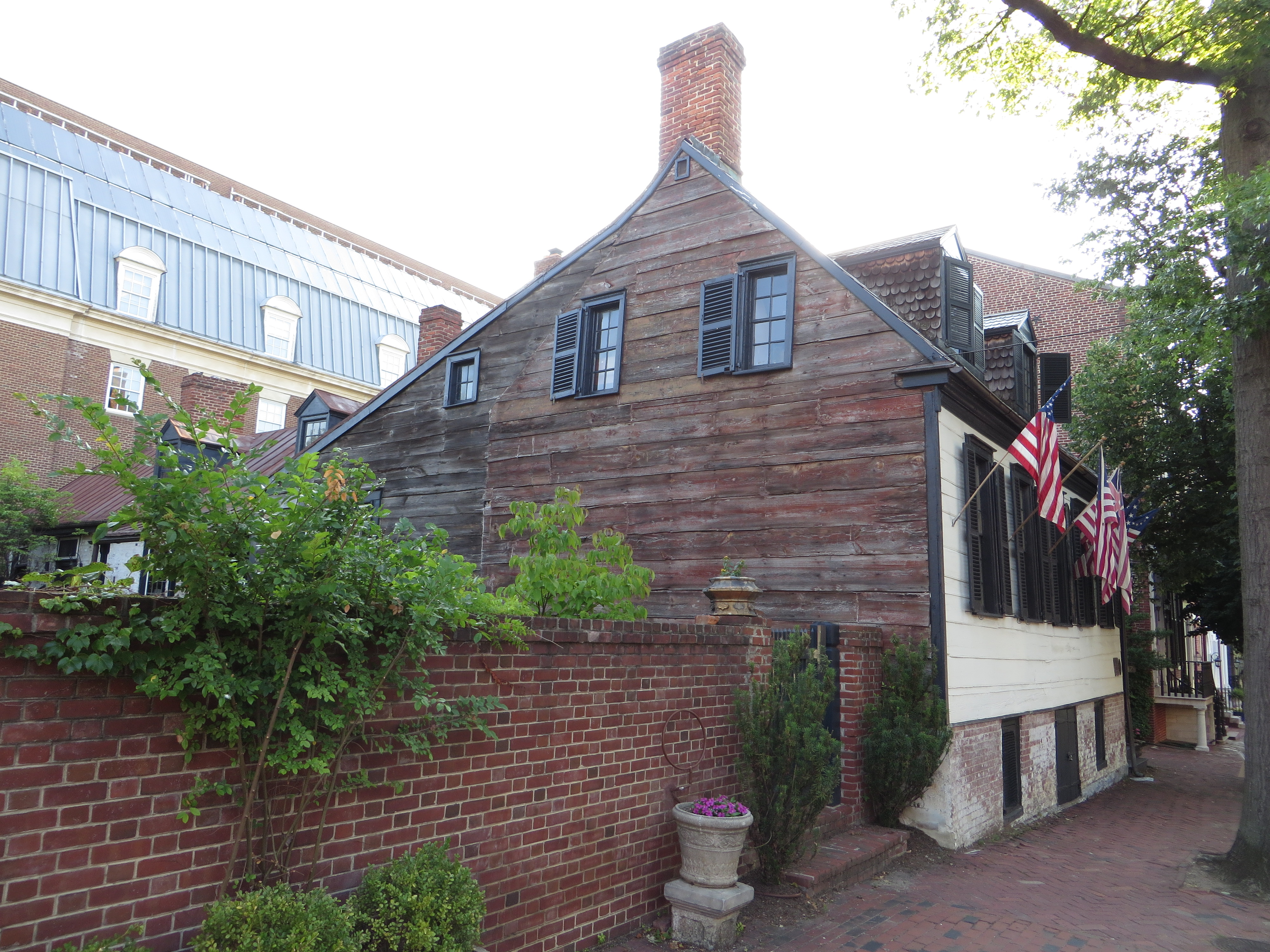
- Murray-Dick-Fawcett House in 2014
- Location: 517 Prince Street, Alexandria, Virginia
- Coordinates: 38°48′13.76″N 7°2′45.2″W
- Built: 1772–1774
- Architectural style: Hall house
- Part of: Alexandria Historic District
- Designated CP: September 18, 2017

The Murray-Dick-Fawcett House (also known as the John Douglass Brown House and the Fawcett-Reeder House) is a home known for being the oldest unaltered building in Alexandria, Virginia.

In April 2017, the building was acquired by the City of Alexandria, and in September of the same year, the home was listed as a contributing property.

== History ==
In 1772, Irish-immigrant, (Note: The City of Alexandria claims that he was born in Ireland, but the Washington Post claims that he was born in Scotland.) Patrick Murray, began the construction of the house and was completed two years later in 1774. The property was expanded in 1784, 1793, and sometime before 1823.

In 1816, John Douglass Brown purchased the house.

In 1936, the property was opened to the public for the Historic American Buildings Survey.

In 2000, after 184 years of the property belonging to the descendants of John Douglass Brown, the property was sold to Joe Reeder. In 2012, Reeder, who had been renovating and restoring the house, put the house up for sale $1,849,000.

On April 27, 2017, the City of Alexandria purchased the house from Reeder.

Reeder passed away on June 23, 2026, at the age of 99.

=== Etymology ===
The house is named after early owners Patrick Murray, Elisha Cullen Dick, and the Fawcett family, who were decedents of John Douglass Brown.

== List of owners ==
- Patrick Murray (1772–1794)
- Elisha Cullen Dick (1794)
- John Thomas Ricketts (1794–1806) (Note: Subdivided)
- William Newton (1794–1806)
- William Smith (1806–1816)
- John Douglass Brown (1816–1830)
- Decedents of John Douglass Brown (1830–2000)
- Charles Joseph "Joe" Reeder II (2000–2026) (Note: Reeder was given permission from the city to stay in the house, which he did until his death in 2026.)
- City of Alexandria (2017–present)
