= Stabler-Leadbeater Apothecary Shop =

Historic commercial building in Virginia, United States

- U.S. National Register of Historic Places
- U.S. National Historic Landmark
- Virginia Landmarks Register
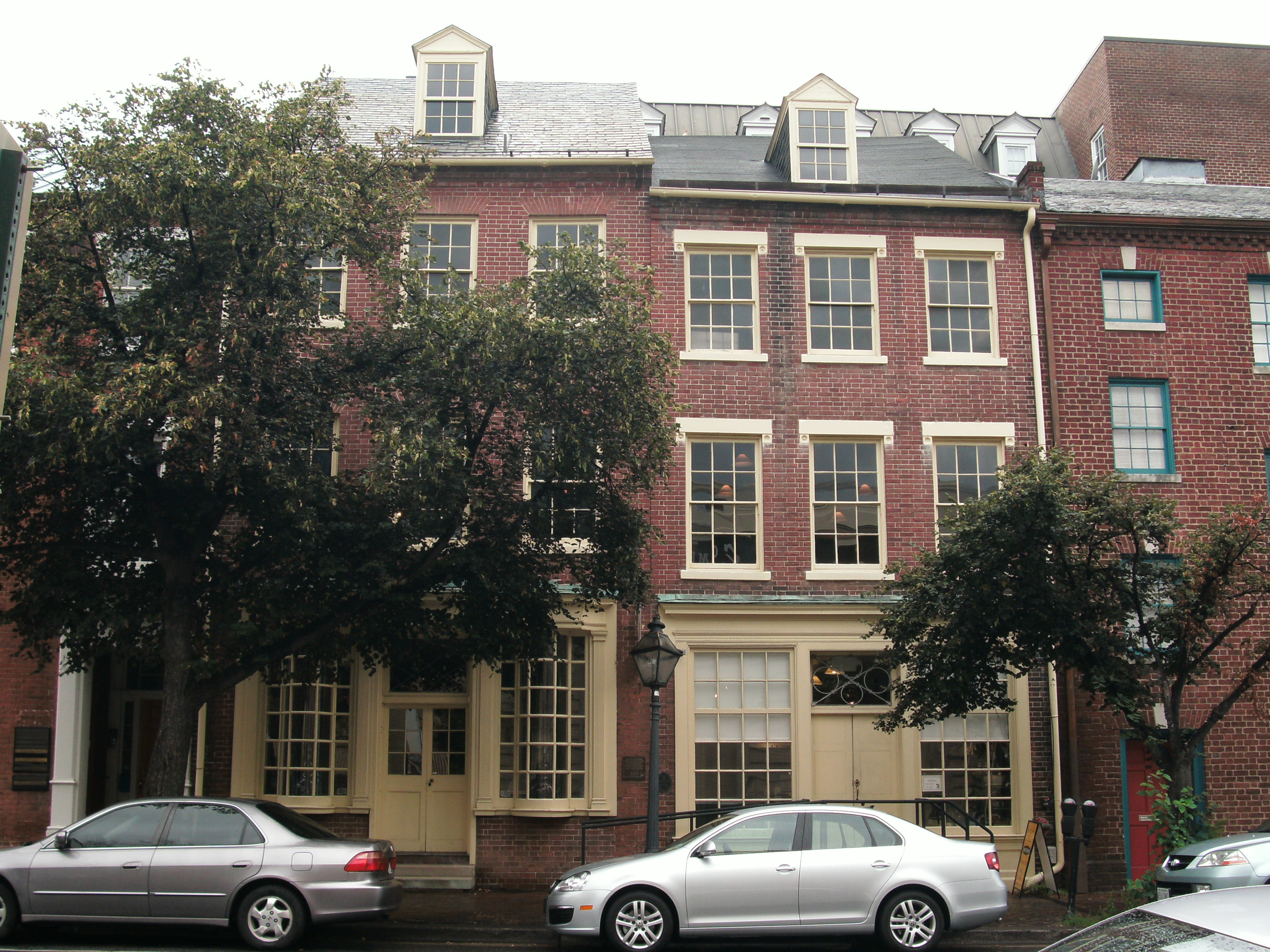

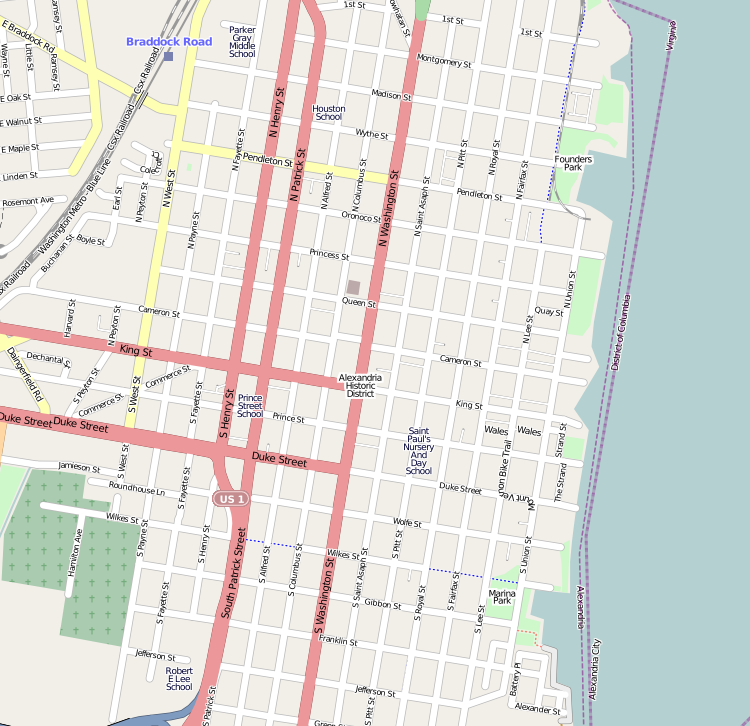
- Location within Alexandria Historical District
- Location: 105–107 S. Fairfax, Alexandria, Virginia
- Coordinates: 38°48′17″N 77°2′33″W
- Area: less than one acre
- Built: 1775
- NRHP reference No.: 82001796, 100006254
- VLR No.: 100-0106

Significant dates
- Added to NRHP: November 24, 1982
- Designated NHL: January 13, 2021
- Designated VLR: March 17, 1981

The Stabler-Leadbeater Apothecary Shop/Museum is a historic apothecary's shop in Alexandria, Virginia, that has been preserved as a museum. During its working life, it was owned by generations of a Quaker family. Eventually, a dramatic decline in sales during the Great Depression forced the shop to close its doors. Almost immediately, in 1939, it was reopened as a museum. Today, most of the artifacts inside the shop are authentic and date to its closing. The building was added to the National Register of Historic Places in 1982, and designated a National Historic Landmark in 2021.

== History ==
Edward Stabler came to Alexandria after apprenticing in the apothecary business with his brother in Leesburg, Virginia. A devout Quaker and savvy businessman, he rented space in 1792 at the corner of King and S. Fairfax to start his business and by 1796, he began renting 107 S. Fairfax. Nine years later, he took ownership of the building and turned it into a bustling apothecary business. By 1829, he had purchased 105 S. Fairfax and incorporated the building into his operation.

Edward Stabler sold to a variety of city and country residents – from Martha Washington to Robert E. Lee, the local doctor to the local farmer. The typical products Stabler sold included medicine, farm and garden equipment, surgical instruments, dental equipment, soap, perfume, Buffalo and Bedford mineral water, cigars, window glass, paint and varnish, artists' supplies, combs and brushes. Much of the medicine he sold was created on-site, using plant and herb materials.

By 1806, Stabler began traveling extensively to Quaker church meetings throughout the region, leaving oldest son William to run the business in his absence. After his father's death in 1831, the business passed to William. Keeping with the family-run tradition, William brought several of his brothers and also his brother-in-law, John Leadbeater, into the business between 1832 and his death in 1852. John Leadbeater, a trained apothecary and dentist, purchased the business from William's wife, as the couple had no children, and changed the name of the business from William Stabler and Co. to John Leadbeater.

Once the Civil War erupted, Alexandria was quickly occupied by Union troops – a fact noted in the Leadbeater business' daybook. After the First Battle of Manassas, Union troops poured into Alexandria and the Apothecary's books reported that many soldiers stood in line to buy "Hot Drops", a cough expectorant containing paprika and alcohol. The drops sold for a cent each and sold over $1,000 in one day!

In 1865, the business was operated by John's son Edward and soon supplied to nearly 500 pharmacies throughout the Washington DC area. At its peak, the Leadbeaters employed 12 salesmen throughout Virginia, West Virginia, and North Carolina to promote their wholesale and mail order businesses. The company operated in 11 buildings in Alexandria, including the two main buildings on Fairfax Street, offices on King Street, warehouses on Lee and Prince Streets, and an office in Washington, D.C.

By the turn of the century however, the family business was beginning to feel the effects of the growing commercial pharmacies and synthetic drug companies, as well as the downturn in the economy, and the business declared bankruptcy in 1933, just days before the death of its owner, Edward S. Leadbeater, Jr.

Spurred into action to save the historic collection for future generations, a plan was crafted by concerned Alexandria citizens and the American Pharmaceutical Association to purchase the collection and archives with private buyers. The majority of the contents and archives were purchased at auction on July 19, 1933, by L. Manuel Hendler, a Baltimore ice cream merchant with an affinity for the history of pharmacy. The following year, the newly formed Landmarks Society of Alexandria purchased the buildings at auction. Hendler then donated the contents and archives to the Landmarks Society.

With the buildings and collection secured, the structures were conjecturally returned to their 18th-century appearance by noted restoration architect, Thomas Tileston Waterman. The museum was officially re-opened in 1939, free of charge thanks to the financial support of the American Pharmaceutical Association. After an extensive renovation adding a fire suppression system, and re-stabilizing the structure, the Landmarks Society donated the museum and its important contents to the City of Alexandria in November 2006.

=== Edward Stabler ===
Edward Stabler, apothecary, founded the shop in 1792 at the corner of King and Fairfax Streets. In 1796, he moved his operation to 107 S. Fairfax. Edward's son, William Stabler, took over the management of the shop in 1819. Stabler was a known anti-slavery proponent and often used his own money to buy slaves to free them.

=== William Stabler ===
William Stabler inherited the business upon the death of Edward in 1831.

=== John Leadbeater ===
John Leadbeater, William Stabler's brother-in-law, took over the business in 1852 upon the death of Stabler. There is a legend that Robert E. Lee was in the store when he received the orders to put down John Brown's raid in 1859. This is unlikely, though the owner of the pharmacy allowed a commemorative plaque to be installed in 1932 by the Sons of the Confederacy.

=== E.S. Leadbeater ===
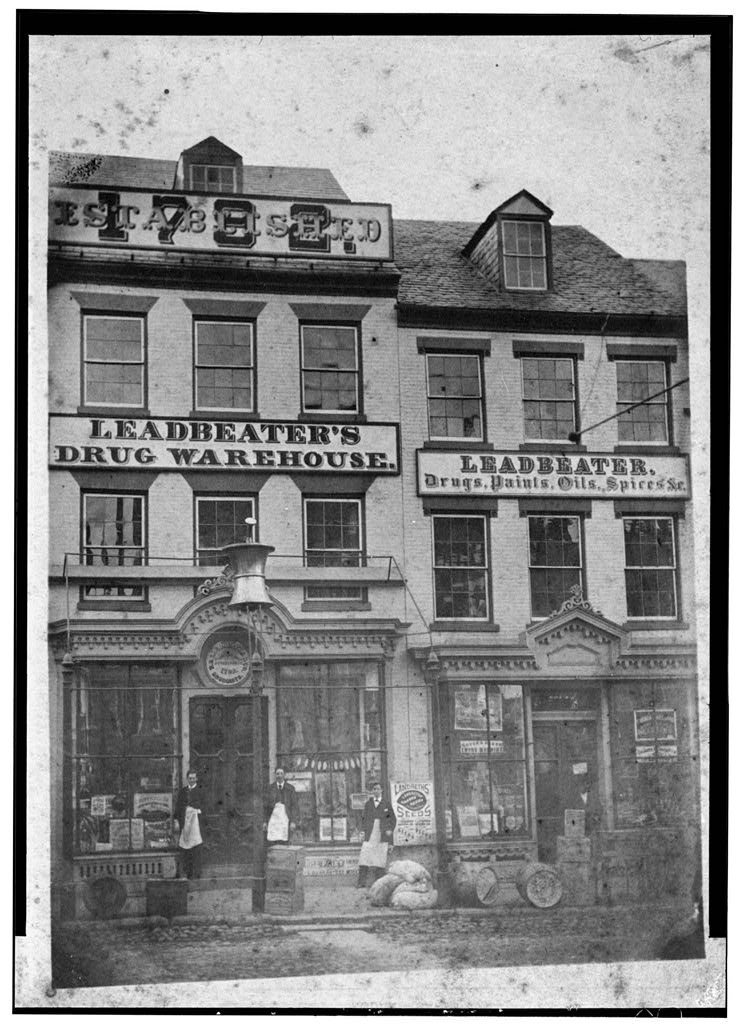
Shop in 1907.

Logo used from 1892–1903.

John's son Edward took over the shop when John died in 1860. The Union-supporting family nearly lost the enterprise to the Confederates. Shortly after the First Battle of Bull Run, exhausted Union soldiers sought comfort from the store's merchandise.

In the early 20th century, the drug store's business was good. Deliveries were made to several states, and there was a lucrative wholesale business.

=== Preservation ===
The tough times of the Great Depression put the Leadbeater Drug Co., then one of the oldest pharmacies in the United States, out of business, but the Alexandria locals, and Manuel Hendler of Baltimore, recognized the history of the establishment and purchased it at the foreclosure auction. It reopened as a museum in 1939, owned and operated by the Landmarks Society, the organization founded to run the museum. In 2004, the museum was closed for renovations. When it was reopened in 2006, it was donated to the City of Alexandria.

== Current museum ==
The museum displays thousands of artifacts, precisely on the shelves where they were when the store closed. The store also still features antebellum Gothic Revival furnishing. After an in-depth restoration in 2006 by The City of Alexandria, the second floor is now included on tours of the museum. The second floor contains a former warehouse room currently used for events, and a manufacturing room, where medicines were made for retail and wholesale. Like the historic retail space on the main floor of the museum, the manufacturing room is practically untouched since 1933.

The museum offers daily tours for individuals and families, and group tours by appointment. Tours are not free, due to ongoing costs associated with maintaining and operating the museum. The museum's hours vary depending on the season, closing on Monday and Tuesday during the winter. The museum also runs various programs for the community. There is a Girl Scout workshop, various discussions on old medicine, and themed birthday parties available.

== Famous customers ==
- Elisha C. Dick, George Washington's doctor, during Washington's terminal illness
- Martha Washington (1802)
- James Monroe
- Eleanor Parke Custis Lewis
- Robert E. Lee (bought paint for the Arlington House)
