= Charles A. Reeder =

Soldier and veteran of the American Civil War

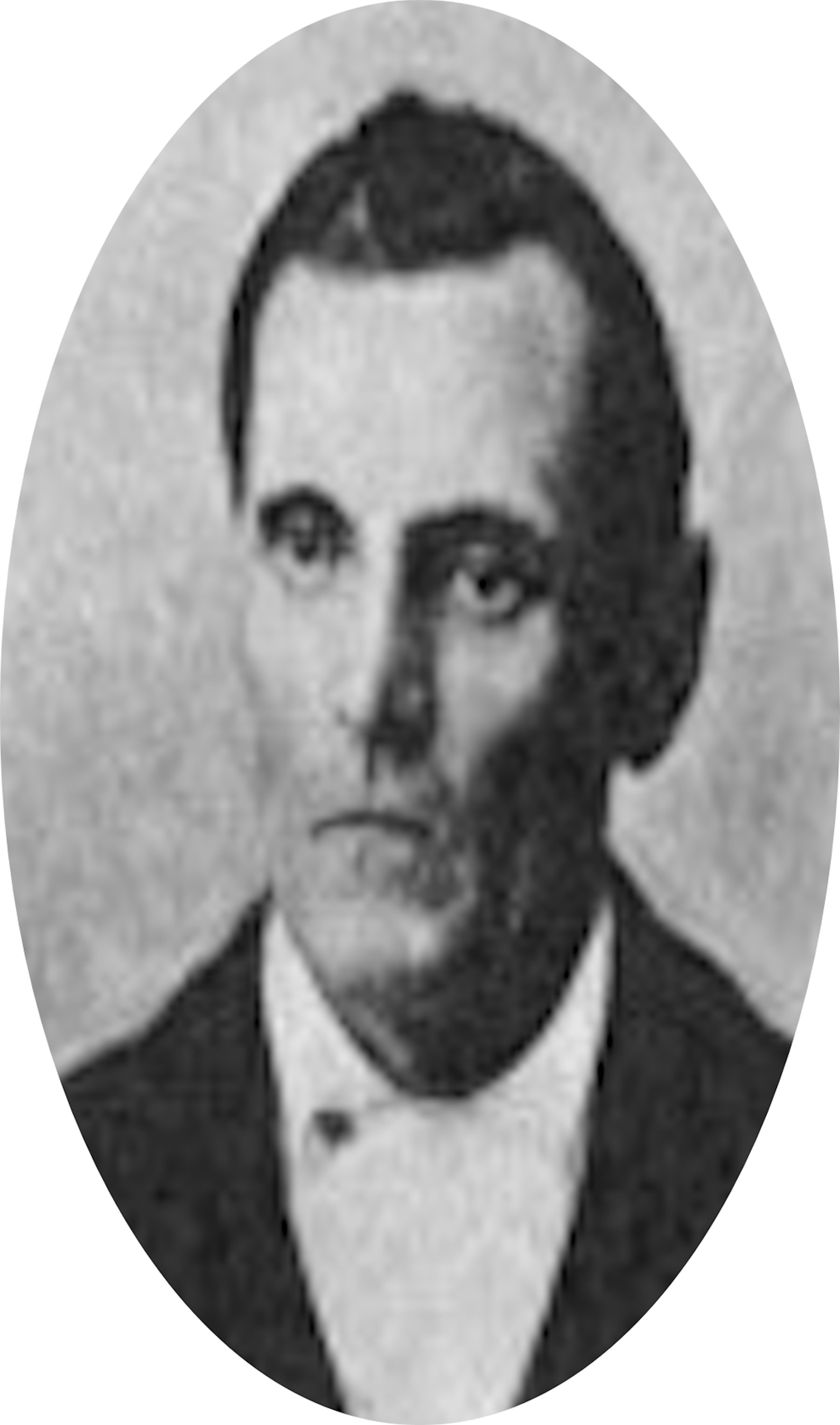
- Born: November 20, 1843; Harrison, Clay County, Virginia, United States
- Died: September 28, 1902 (aged 58); Morgantown, West Virginia, United States
- Burial place: Shinnston Memorial Cemetery and Mausoleum, Shinnston, West Virginia
- Military career
- Allegiance: United States
- Branch: United States Army; Union Army
- Rank: Private
- Units: Company G, 12th West Virginia Volunteer Infantry Regiment
- Conflicts: Third Battle of Petersburg
- Awards: Medal of Honor

Charles Avery Reeder (November 20, 1843 – September 28, 1902) was an American soldier who fought for the Union Army during the American Civil War. He received the Medal of Honor for valor.

== Biography ==
Reeder received the Medal of Honor in April 3, 1867 for his actions at Fort Gregg during the Third Battle of Petersburg on April 2, 1865 while with Company G of the 12th West Virginia Volunteer Infantry Regiment.

== Medal of Honor citation ==
Citation:

The President of the United States of America, in the name of Congress, takes pleasure in presenting the Medal of Honor to Private Charles A. Reeder, United States Army, for extraordinary heroism on 2 April 1865, while serving with Company G, 12th West Virginia Infantry, in action at Petersburg (Battery Gregg), Virginia, for capture of flag.

== See also ==
- List of American Civil War Medal of Honor recipients: Q–S
