= Contrabands and Freedmen Cemetery =

Historic cemetery in Virginia, United States

- U.S. National Register of Historic Places
- Virginia Landmarks Register
- Location within Northern Virginia Location within Virginia Location within the United States
- Location: 1001 S. Washington Street, Alexandria, Virginia
- Coordinates: 38°47′40″N 77°02′59″W
- NRHP reference No.: 12000516
- VLR No.: 100-0121-1085

Significant dates
- Added to NRHP: August 15, 2012
- Designated VLR: June 21, 2012

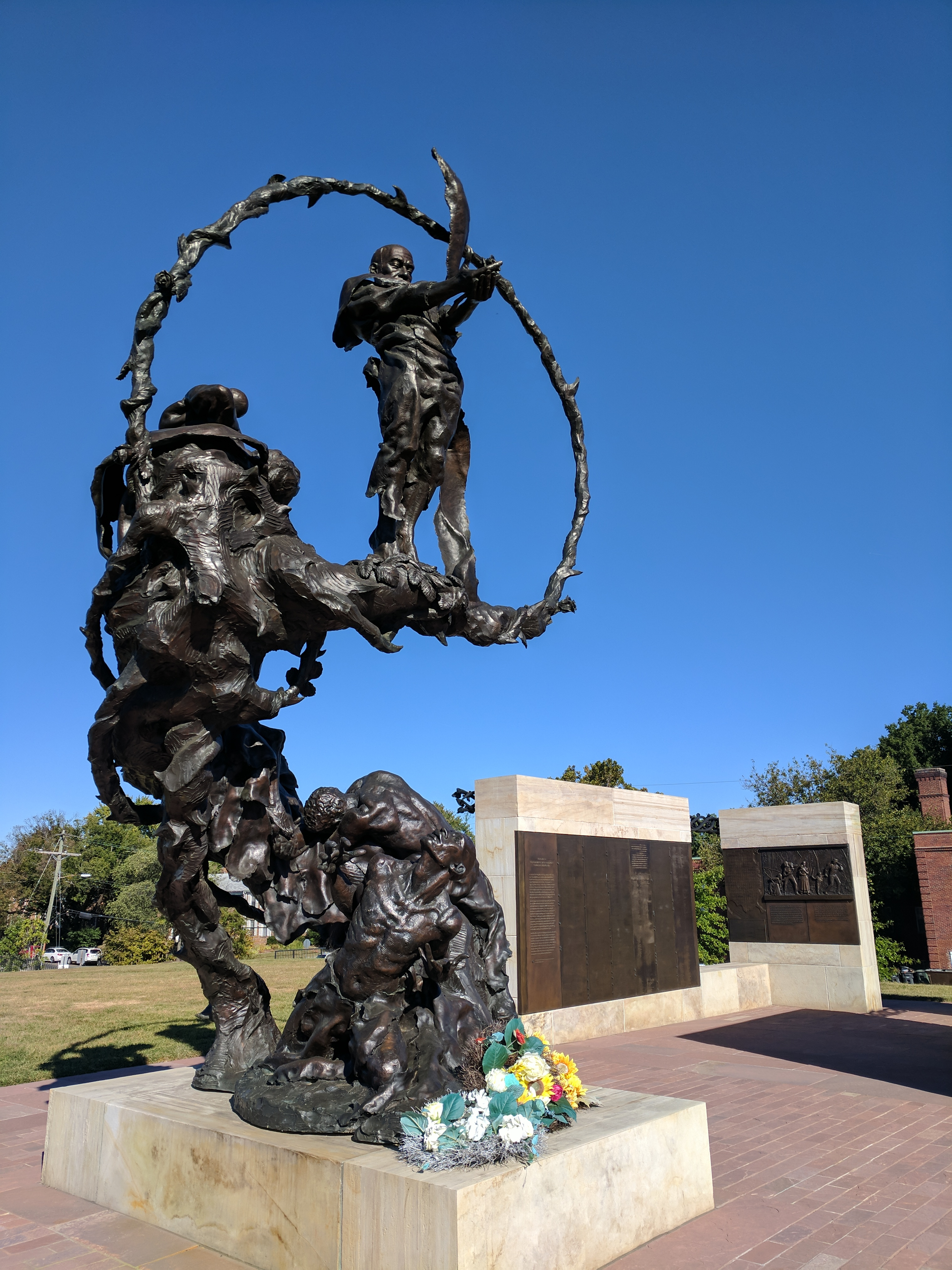
The Path of Thorns and Roses by Mario Chiodo, at Contrabands and Freedmen Cemetery

The Contrabands and Freedmen Cemetery at 1001 S. Washington St. in Alexandria, Virginia was listed on the National Register of Historic Places on August 15, 2012. It was established in February 1864 by the Union military commander of the Alexandria District for use as a cemetery for the burial of Africans who had escaped slavery, known as contrabands and freedmen. During early Reconstruction, it was operated by the Freedmen's Bureau. It was closed in late 1868, after Congress ended most operations of the Bureau. The last recorded burial was made in January 1869.

The history of the site was rediscovered in the late 20th century, and archeological techniques were used to identify its boundaries and burials. The land was acquired by the city and the cemetery re-established as a memorial in 2014.

Initially the Union Army buried soldiers of the United States Colored Troops here as well. But African troops in Alexandria's hospitals "demanded that blacks be given the honor of burial in the Soldiers' Cemetery, now Alexandria National Cemetery." In January 1865, the soldiers' remains were moved to the military cemetery.

== History ==
For African Americans who escaped enslavement, the Union military occupation of Alexandria during the American Civil War created opportunity on an unprecedented scale. They flooded into Union-controlled areas as Federal troops extended their occupation of the seceded states. Safely behind Union lines, the cities of Alexandria and Washington offered not only comparative freedom and protection from their former enslavers, but employment for refugees. Over the course of the war, Alexandria was transformed by the Union Army into a major supply depot and transport and hospital center, all under army control.

Because people who escaped slavery were still legally considered property of their owners, until the Emancipation Proclamation (January 1, 1863) freed them, they were classified as "contraband property" by the Union Army so that they would not have to return these people to bondage under supporters of the Confederacy. Without this designation, the Union soldiers and officers would be in violation of the Fugitive Slave Act of 1850.

African American men and women took positions with the U.S. Army as construction workers, nurses and hospital stewards, longshoremen, painters, wood cutters, teamsters, laundresses, cooks, gravediggers, personal servants, and ultimately as soldiers and sailors. They were also hired as domestic day laborers by other citizens. According to one statistic, the population of Alexandria had exploded to 18,000 by the fall of 1863 – an increase of 10,000 people in 16 months.

When the Fifteenth Amendment was ratified in 1870, Alexandria County's African American population was more than 8,700, or about half the total number of residents. This newly enfranchised constituency was instrumental to the election of the first black Alexandrians to the City Council and the Virginia Legislature.

Once in Alexandria, many people arrived in ill health and malnourished after walking long distances from other counties in Virginia. They were housed in barracks and whatever housing they could build for themselves. In such close quarters, with poor sanitation, smallpox and typhoid outbreaks were prevalent and death was common, as it was in most military encampments. More than half of those buried in the cemetery were African American children under age five.

In February 1864, after hundreds had died, the commander of the Alexandria military district, General John P. Slough, confiscated a parcel of undeveloped land at the corner of South Washington and Church streets from a pro-Confederate owner to be used as a cemetery specifically for burial of African Americans. Burials started in March that year.

The cemetery operated under General Slough's command. Its oversight was supervised by Alexandria's civilian Superintendent of Contrabands, the Rev. Albert Gladwin, who made arrangements for burials. Each grave was identified with a whitewashed, wooden grave marker. In 1868, after Congress ended most functions of the Freedmen's Bureau, the federal government stopped managing the cemetery and returned the property to its original owners. Their descendants conveyed the undeveloped land to the Catholic Diocese of Richmond in 1917. A Washington Post newspaper article in 1892 stated the wooden grave markers had decayed and people had unofficially continued using the site for burials. The "Book of Records" maintained first by the Office of the Superintendent of Contrabands, and later by the Freedmen's Bureau, documents the names of 1,711 people buried at the cemetery between 1864 and 1869.

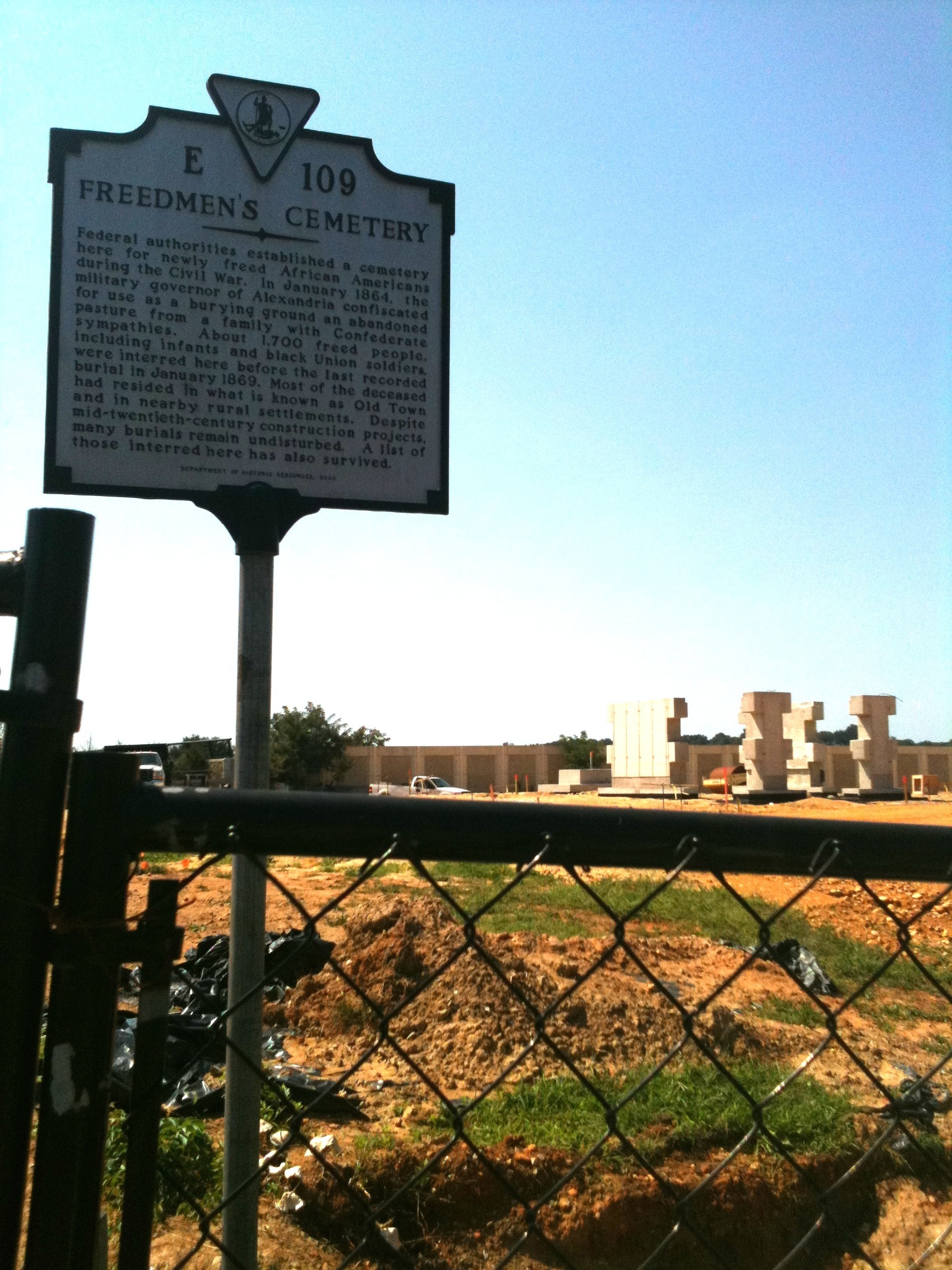
Memorial - construction photo (late 2012)

== Rediscovery of the Cemetery ==
The Cemetery disappeared from city maps after 1946 and in 1955, a gas station and, later, an office building were built on the site. Beginning in 1987, when the history of the cemetery was rediscovered, it began to receive more attention. Archeological surveys in relation to construction of the Woodrow Wilson Bridge included use of ground penetrating radar (GPR) to determine the presence of graves. Some excavations also took place in order to locate surviving interments.

In 1997 the Friends of Freedmen Cemetery was organized to raise public awareness of the cemetery and support for its preservation. The City of Alexandria began the process of acquiring land and saving the cemetery to create a memorial park.

In 2008, the city received submissions from 20 countries in a design competition for the memorial, and a design for by C.J. Howard of Alexandria was selected. The cemetery memorial opened in September 2014 and includes a sculpture, The Path of Thorns and Roses by Mario Chiodo, at the center of the park. The names of people buried at the site that were recorded in the "Book of Records" are etched into bronze plaques.

As Contrabands and Freedmen Cemetery, the cemetery was listed on the U.S. National Register of Historic Places in August 2012. It was added in 2015 to the National Park Service's National Underground Railroad Network to Freedom, a series of designated sites related to the history of slaves escaping bondage.

== Historical markers ==
A historical marker erected in 2000 by the Virginia Department of Historic Resources reads:

Freedmen's Cemetery

Federal authorities established a cemetery here for newly freed African Americans during the Civil War. In January 1864, the military governor of Alexandria confiscated for use as a burying ground an abandoned pasture from a family with Confederate sympathies. About 1,700 people, including infants and black Union soldiers, were interred here before the last recorded burial in January 1869. Most of the deceased had resided in what is known as Old Town and in nearby rural settlements. Despite mid-twentieth-century construction projects, many burials remain undisturbed. A list of those interred here has also survived.

The list of those interred is posted at the Memorial, together with the historic note:

Besides the school in the barracks there are others in the city, which are self sustaining, containing one hundred and fifty pupils. It is an astonishing fact, which ought to be placed upon record ... [ellipsis in the original] that out of the two thousand people collected at Alexandria, there are four hundred children sent daily to school. The first demand of these fugitives when they come into the place is, that their children may go to school.

== See also ==
- Alexandria Black History Museum
- Franklin and Armfield Office
