= Alexandria Library (Virginia) =

Public library system of Alexandria, Virginia

Coordinates: 38°48′28″N 77°2′49″W

- Location: US
- Established: 1794
- Branches: 6

Collection
- Size: 503,191

Other information
- Director: Rose T. Dawson
- Website: alexlibraryva.org

Alexandria Library is the public library in Alexandria, Virginia in the United States.

== History ==
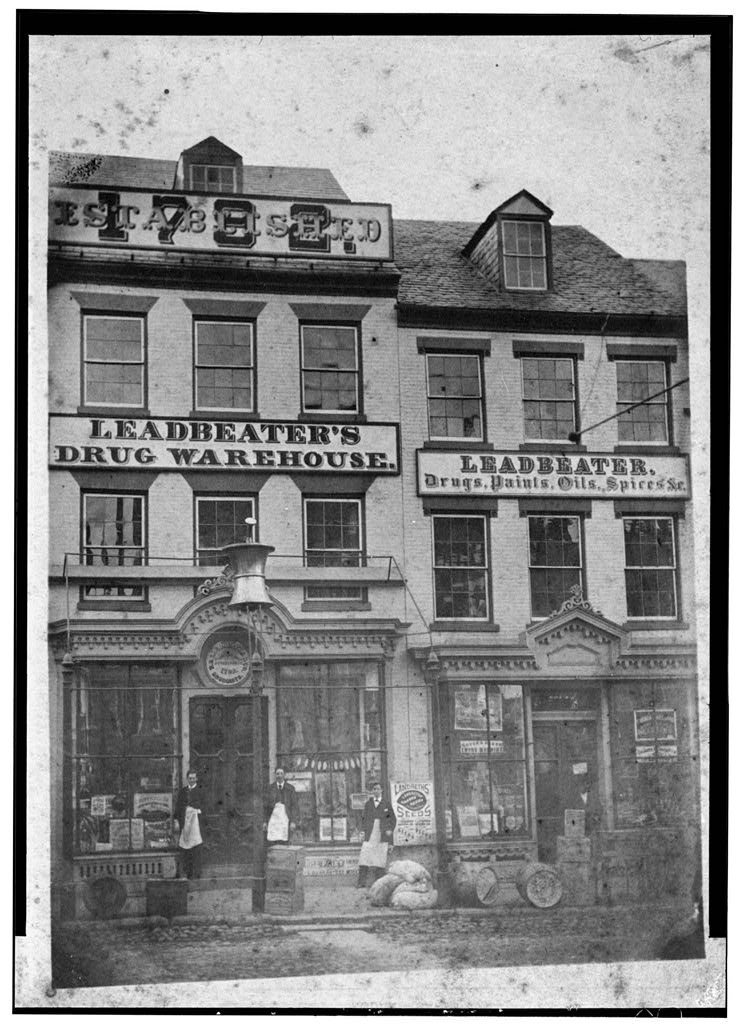
The city's first library, located in an apothecary shop

John Wise, a local Alexandria businessman and hotel keeper, hosted a meeting in his home in 1789 to discuss the creation of a Society for the Promotion of Useful Knowledge. Members included Rev. James Muir, physician Elisha Cullen Dick, and George Washington's personal attorney Charles Lee. Though the Society did not last for long, on July 24, 1794, the founders of the Society once again met at Wise's home to establish a subscription library. During the first year, 119 men joined the circulating library which was to be called the Library Company of Alexandria. Members agreed to pay an initiation fee and annual dues. The company was chartered as a corporation in 1798 in an act passed by the General Assembly of Virginia.

Druggist Edward Stabler was elected the first librarian and the library's first location is believed to have been housed in his apothecary shop. James Kennedy was elected the second librarian, and the library moved to his residence and place of business. Kennedy sold books from his personal collection to the Library Company. Those books and other bought from two local merchants formed the foundation of the subscription library. The first catalog of the library's collection was published in 1797. The collection grew over time, bolstered in part by the fact that some members paid their dues in books. Most members were initially men, although records exist showing some women were members as early as 1798. One noted female member in 1817 was Mary L.F. Custis, wife of George Washington Parke Custis.

The catalog published in 1801 indicated a collection of 452 books, mostly on history and travel. By 1815, there were 1,022 entries in the catalog, and the collection had added more biographies, fiction, and magazines. The library was housed in several locations over the ensuing years, including the New Market House next to the City Hall, the Lyceum Company building, and Peabody Hall, which was owned by the Alexandria School Board. Raising funds for the library was a continuing challenge. In 1853, a lecture series was created to raise money. Speakers included Professor Joseph Henry of the Smithsonian, Colonel Francis H. Smith of the Virginia Military Institute, and humorist George W. Bagby.

The Civil War took its toll on the library collection. Members were able to remove some of the collection prior to the library's occupation by Union troops. The library was used as a hospital and much of the library's collection was lost during this time. After the war, the building was sold to a private owner who planned to turn the building into a private residence and asked the library to remove what was left of the collection. Funds continued to be hard to come by and in 1879, the Library Company closed. The remainder of its collection was stored in Peabody Hall.

In 1897, a group of women in Alexandria formed the Alexandria Library Association. The leaders of the group were Virginia Corse, Mrs. William B. Smoot, and Virginia Burke. They petitioned the school board to open a subscription library in Peabody Hall, using the old books stored there. Permission was given and doors to the new subscription library opened on December 1, 1897. In 1902, the library moved to the first floor of a house in the 1300 block of Prince Street while negotiations were underway for a permanent move to the Confederate Hall, located at 806 Prince Street. In May 1903, the library moved to the Confederate Hall, now known as the Robert E. Lee Camp Hall Museum, where it stayed for 34 years.

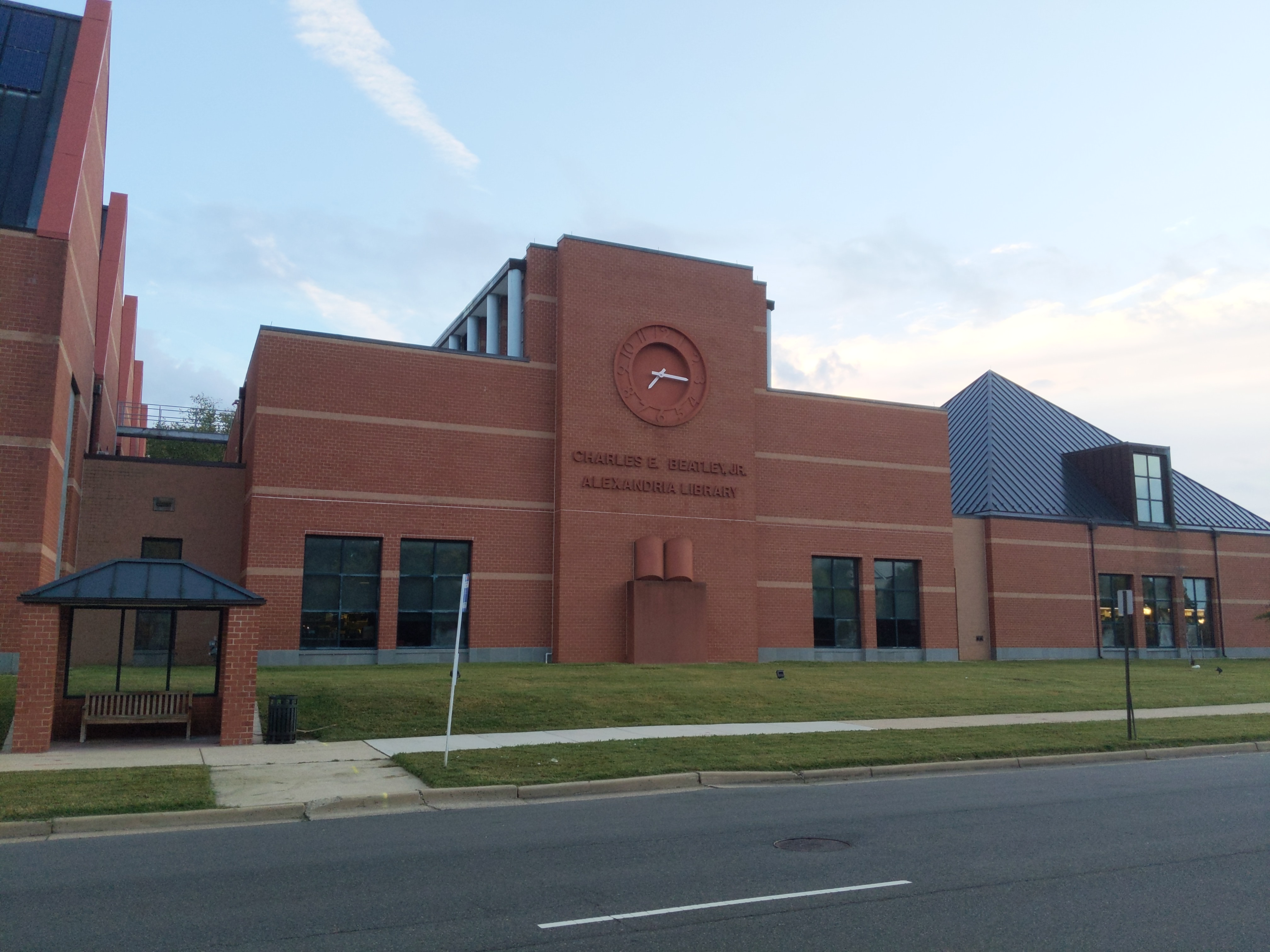
The Charles E. Beatley, Jr. Central Library

In 1937, Dr. Robert South Barrett donated funds to build a public library in memory of his mother, physician Dr. Kate Waller Barrett (1857-1925). The Society of Friends granted a 99-year lease for use of its former Quaker Burial Ground (then used as a playground). An informal agreement provided that the interments would not be disturbed, although the few gravestones were transferred to the Woodlawn Quaker Meetinghouse and a granite marker acknowledges the former use. Thus, the new library building was built without a basement, but rather on a concrete slab foundation (as were subsequent additions). The Library Company cooperated in this effort, contracting with the Alexandria City Council to turn over its collections to City of Alexandria as the City agreed to include the public library's operating expenses in its budget. The Alexandria Library Association became the Alexandria Library Society.

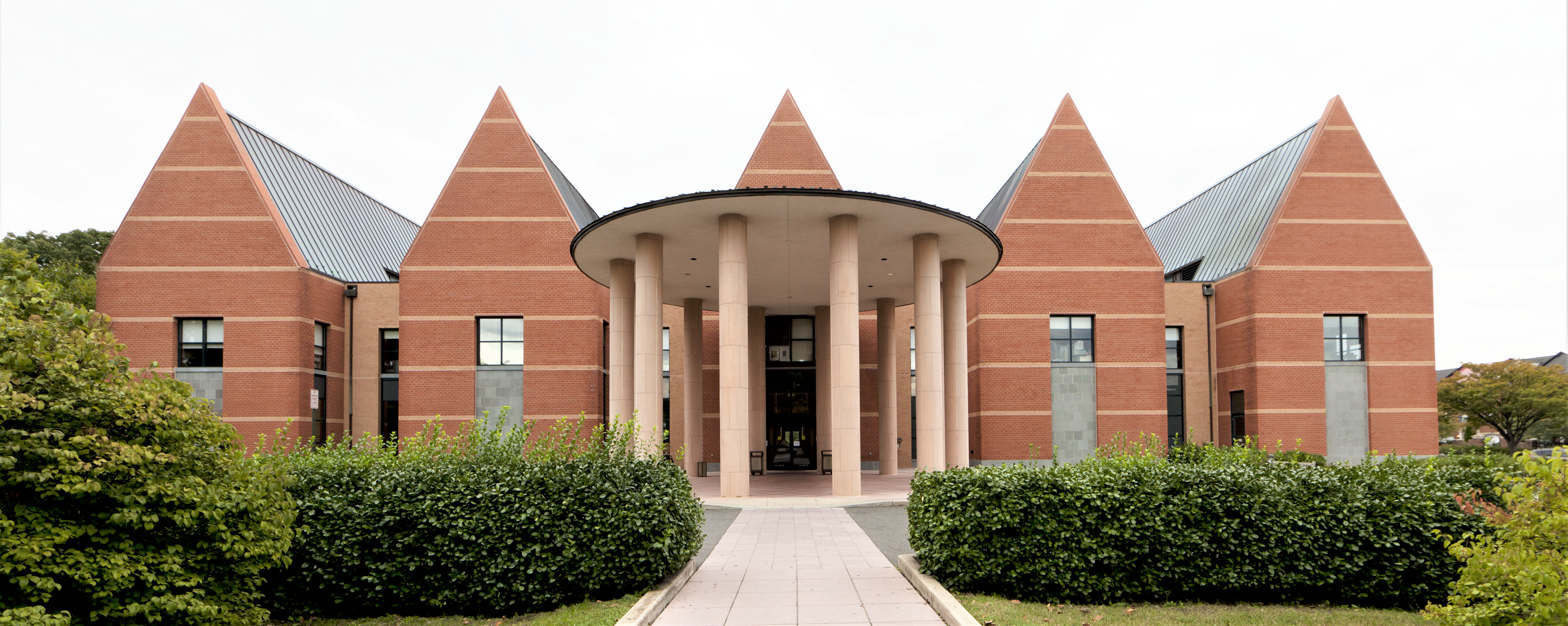
Beatley Central Library

Due to practices common in Virginia and other Southern states at the time, the public library originally only permitted white residents to use the facility. On August 21, 1939, several young African American men, in a strategy devised by attorney Samuel Wilbert Tucker (who grew up about two blocks from the new library), staged a peaceable sit-in at the library to enable African Americans to use that public facility in the first known non-violent sit-in of the Civil rights movement in America. Although they were arrested, charges were ultimately dropped by city attorney Armistead Boothe, and a branch library was built in 1940 for African Americans and named after Robert H. Robinson, which closed circa 1960 and now houses the Alexandria Black History Museum.

In 1947, the Library Society was reconstituted and took the earlier historic name Alexandria Library Company. A lecture series was also revived. Speakers included Thomas Jefferson biographer Dumas Malone. Some of the books belonging in the original collection of the Alexandria Library Company can now be found in the Local History/Special Collections Room at the Queen Street library that still carries Mrs. Barrett's name. In 1948, Ellen Coolidge Burke became director. Burke brought bookmobile services to Alexandria, one of the first services in Virginia. She oversaw the growth of the library system by the addition of two new branch libraries. In April 1968 the Ellen Coolidge Burke Branch at 4701 Seminary Road was opened, and in December 1969 the James M. Duncan branch at 2501 Commonwealth Avenue. Burke retired in 1969.

== Current operations ==
Reference area in Beatley Central Library

Today the library consists of a new central building (built in 2000 and named for mayor Charles E. Beatley) and four branch libraries, and includes two special divisions: Local History /Special Collections (in what became the Kate Waller Barret Branch Library) and a Talking Books division for the blind and visually handicapped. The other library buildings are: the Ellen Coolidge Burke Branch Library, the James M. Duncan Branch Library and the law library branch located in the historic Alexandria City Hall near the Barrett branch.

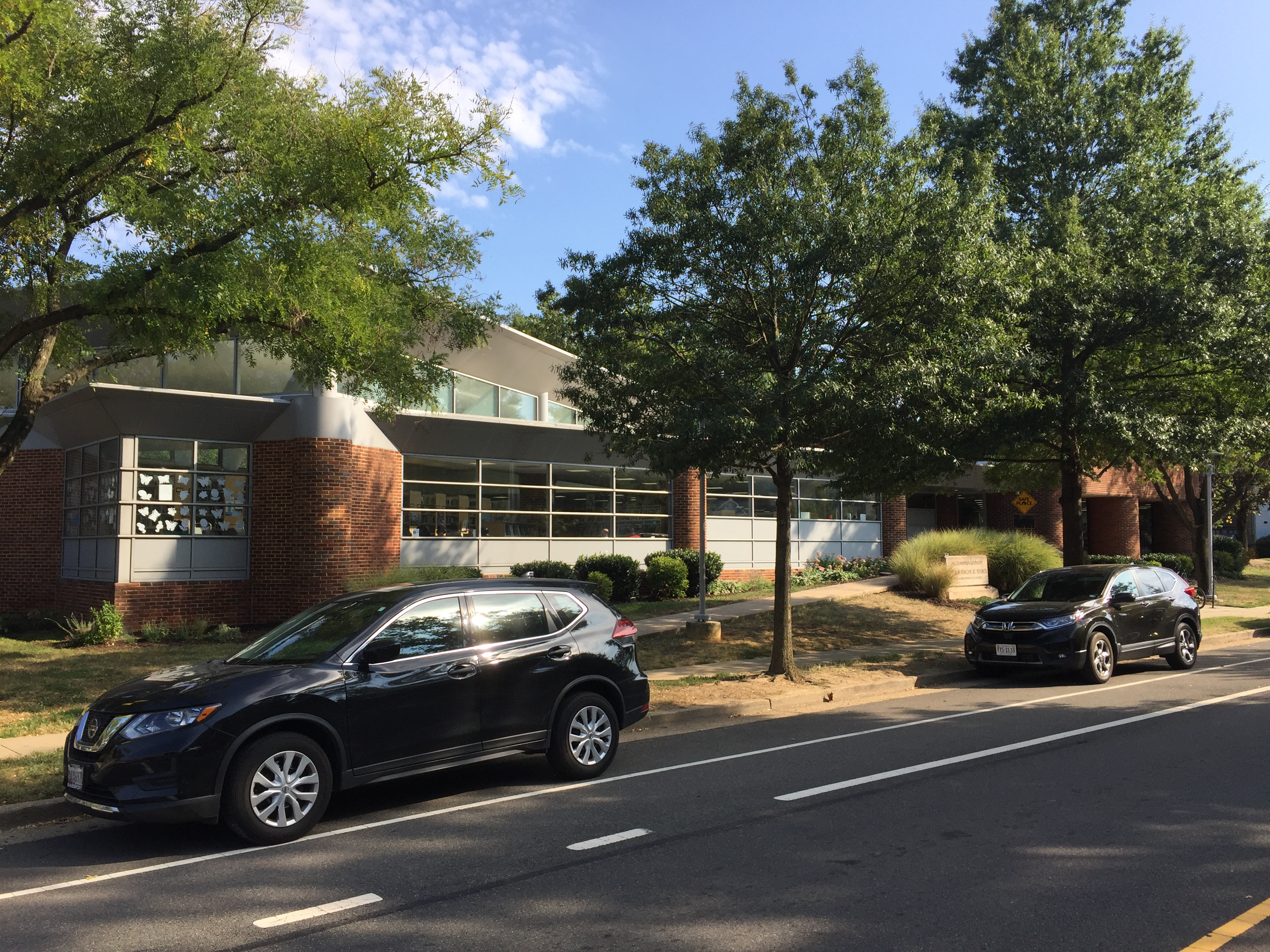
Duncan Branch Library in 2019

Patrons check out more than 1.5 million titles annually, including books, CDs, DVDs, magazines, eAudioBooks, and other items. The system owned 503,191 items and had 700,921 library visitors (more than 1.3 million including its web site) in FY2017. The library's current director is Rose T. Dawson. Among its more than 150 employees are more than 40 staff with master's degrees in library science.

The library offers a wide variety of programs and services, both in the branches and via the Web site. Each branch has computers for access to the Internet, the catalog, downloadable material and databases. Library sponsored programs include: summer reading, One Book/One City, literary discussion groups, author book signings, children story times and other events for the city's diverse population. The Alexandria Library also started offering passport services at the Barrett Branch and Beatley Central Library in October 2016.

== Non-resident privileges ==
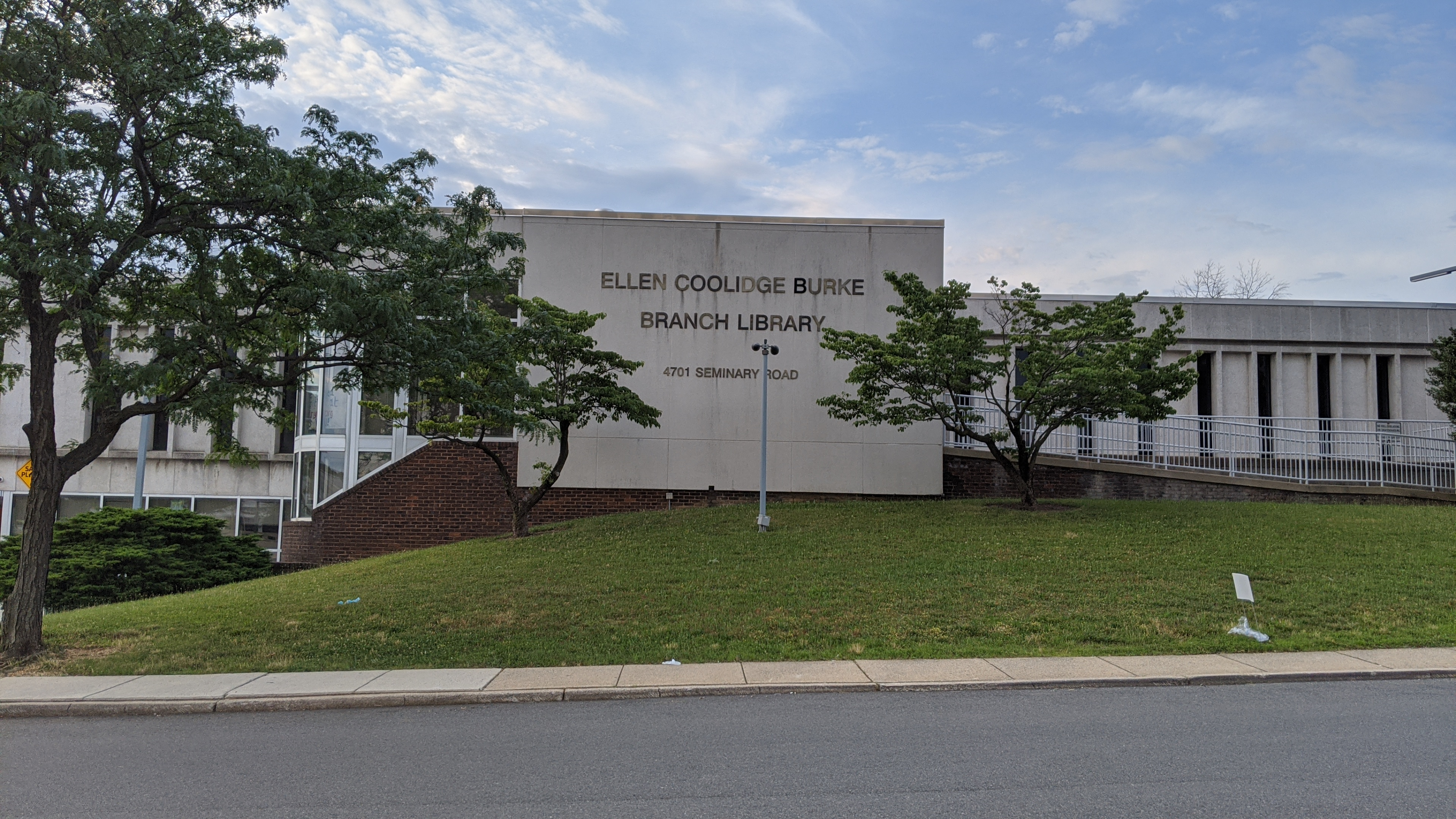
Ellen Coolidge Burke Branch Library

Non-residents of the city who work, own property or attend school in the city may obtain a library card without charge. Non-residents who live in an area that will offer reciprocal library card privileges to Alexandria residents may also obtain a free library card. Thus, residents of the District of Columbia, the Maryland counties of Montgomery and Prince George's, the Virginia cities of Fairfax and Falls Church, and Virginia counties of Arlington, Fairfax, Fauquier, Frederick, Loudoun, and Prince William are all eligible.

== Nearby public library systems ==
- Arlington Public Library
- Fairfax County Public Library
- District of Columbia Public Library
- Prince George's County Memorial Library System
