= Alexandria Black History Museum =

Museum

- Location: Old Town Alexandria, Virginia, U.S.
- Coordinates: 38°48′43″N 77°02′53″W
- Public transit access: Washington Metro at King Street–Old Town
- Website: www.alexandriava.gov/BlackHistory

The Alexandria Black History Museum, located at 902 Wythe St., Alexandria, Virginia, is operated by the City of Alexandria. The building was formerly the Robert H. Robinson Library, originally constructed in 1940 as the first "separate but equal" library for African Americans in the segregated city.

== History ==
In 1794, Alexandria Library opened as a private lending library, calling itself the Alexandria Library Company. In 1937, Dr. Robert South Barrett donated funds to build Alexandria's Public Library. The Library Company cooperated in this effort, contracting with the Alexandria City Council to turn over its collections to City of Alexandria as the City agreed to include the public library's operating expenses in its budget.

Since the library's budget was collected from the taxes paid by every American Citizen regardless their race, the lawyer Samuel Wilbert Tucker organized in 1939 a pacific sit-in at the new and "whites only" Alexandria, Virginia public library (Kate Waller Barret branch) that lead to their arrest by Virginia's police.

The 1939 event is commonly cited as the first non-violent protest by African Americans against racial segregation.

== Museum ==
The museum has changing exhibitions on local and national topics related to African Americans.

The museum also operates the Alexandria African American Heritage Park, a 9-acre (3.6 ha) park at 500 Holland Lane, which contains a 1-acre (0.40 ha) nineteenth-century African-American cemetery that was buried under a city landfill in the 1960s.

== See also ==
- Contrabands and Freedmen Cemetery
- Franklin and Armfield Office
- Frederick Douglass National Historic Site
- National Museum of African American History and Culture
- National Museum of African Art
- Anacostia Community Museum
- Founders Library
- Alexandria Library (Virginia)
- Jim Crow laws
- List of museums focused on African Americans
