= List of restaurants in Baltimore =

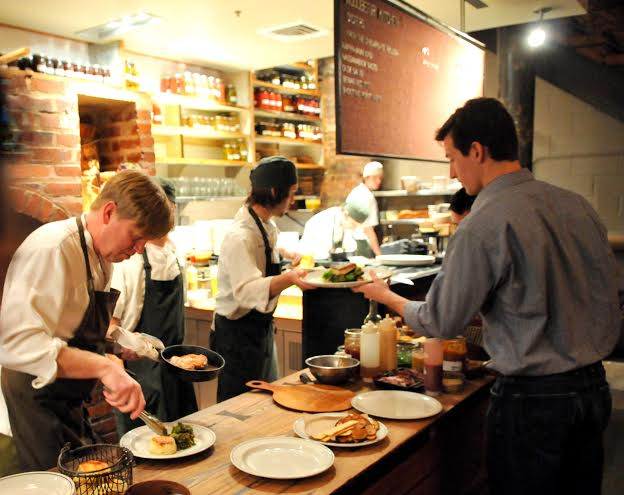
Woodberry Kitchen

Following is a list of notable restaurants in Baltimore, Maryland:

- Andy Nelson's Southern Pit Barbecue
- Attman's Delicatessen
- Brass Elephant
- The Brewer's Art
- Brooklandville House
- Cafe Hon
- Chicken George
- Faidley's Seafood
- Gino's Hamburgers
- Haussner's Restaurant
- Little Tavern
- Looney's Pub
- Martick's Restaurant Francais
- Mobtown Ballroom and Café
- Red Emma's
- Venice Tavern
- White Coffee Pot
- Woodberry Kitchen
