= Concord Park, Pennsylvania =

Historically significant neighborhood in Pennsylvania

Concord Park
- Neighborhood
- Location in Pennsylvania
- Coordinates: 40°07′52″N 74°58′33″W
- Country: United States
- State: Pennsylvania
- Census-designated place: Trevose, Pennsylvania
- ZIP Code: 19053

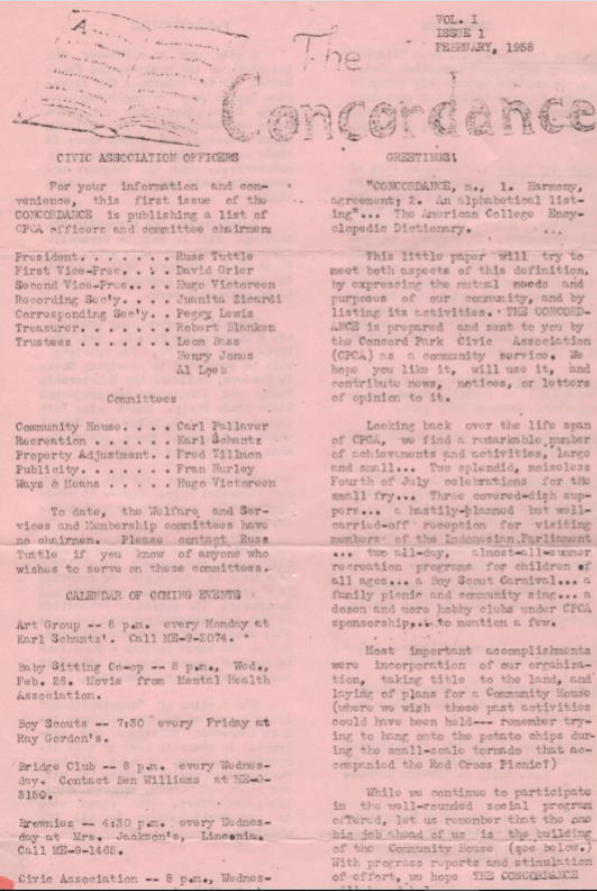
First Issue of Concordance Newsletter

Concord Park is a residential neighborhood in the Trevose section of Bensalem Township, Bucks County, Pennsylvania, originally established as an intentional racially integrated community in 1954 by Morris Milgram, a pioneering social activist and civil rights trailblazer who believed Black people should have the same access to housing as whites.

Concord Park Homes were "the first planned open occupancy homes for sale by a builder determined to build only integrated housing; 139 three and four-bedroom homes were sold and occupied by 55 percent white families and 45 percent Negro families." Some of the early homeowners included interracial couples, communists, and other nonconformists.

The community's origin and history were featured at Bensalem Township's 325th anniversary in 2017 at Growden Mansion and on the Mayor's Show.

== Gallery ==
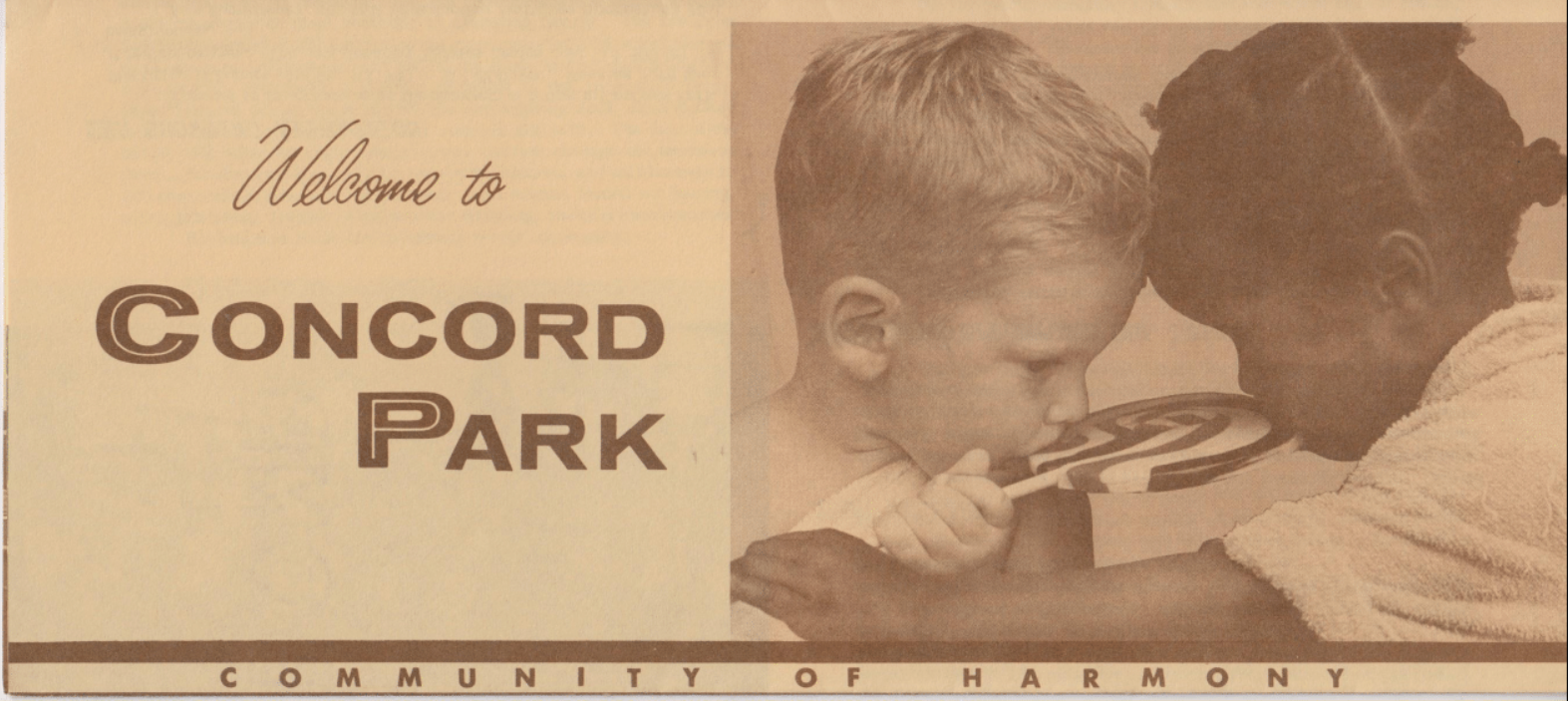
Concord Park Homes brochure

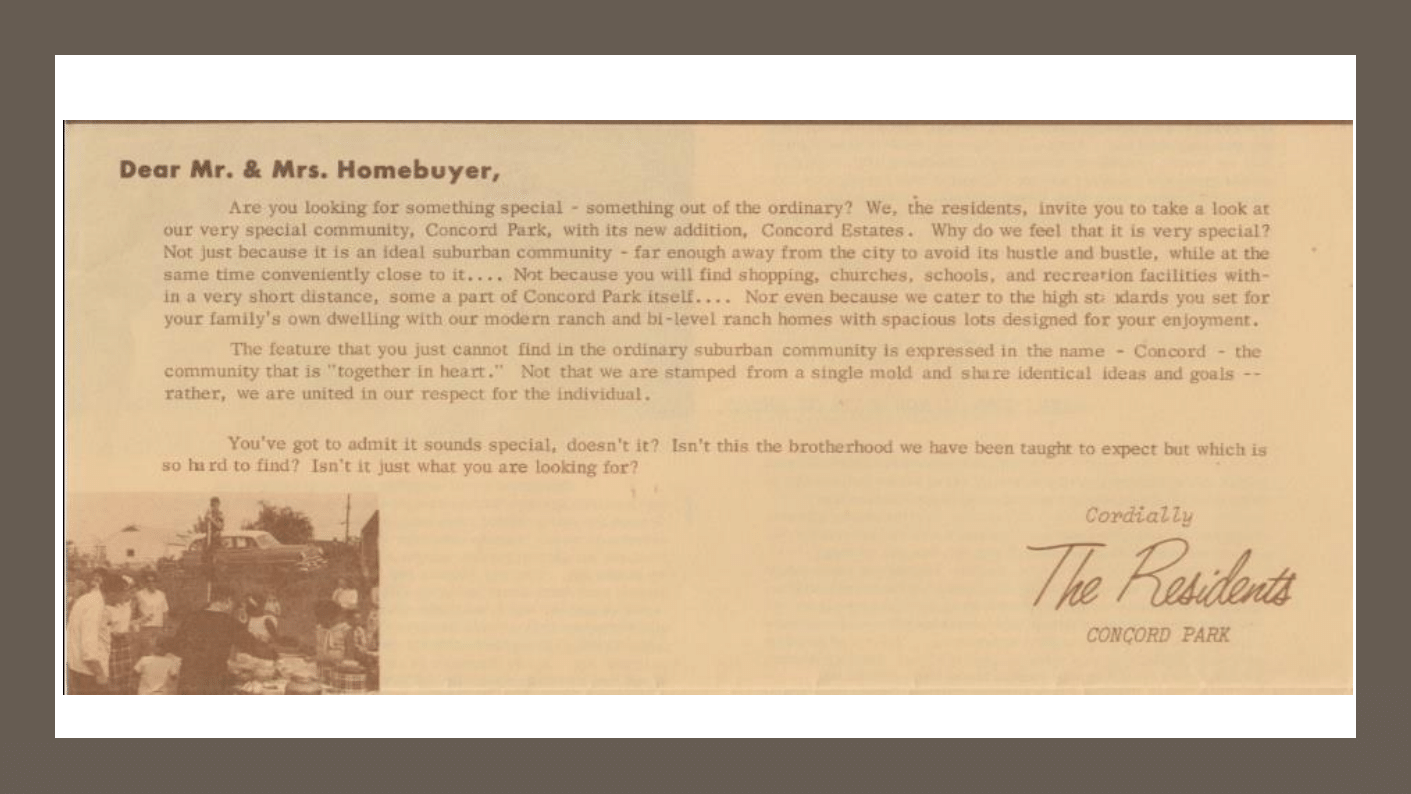

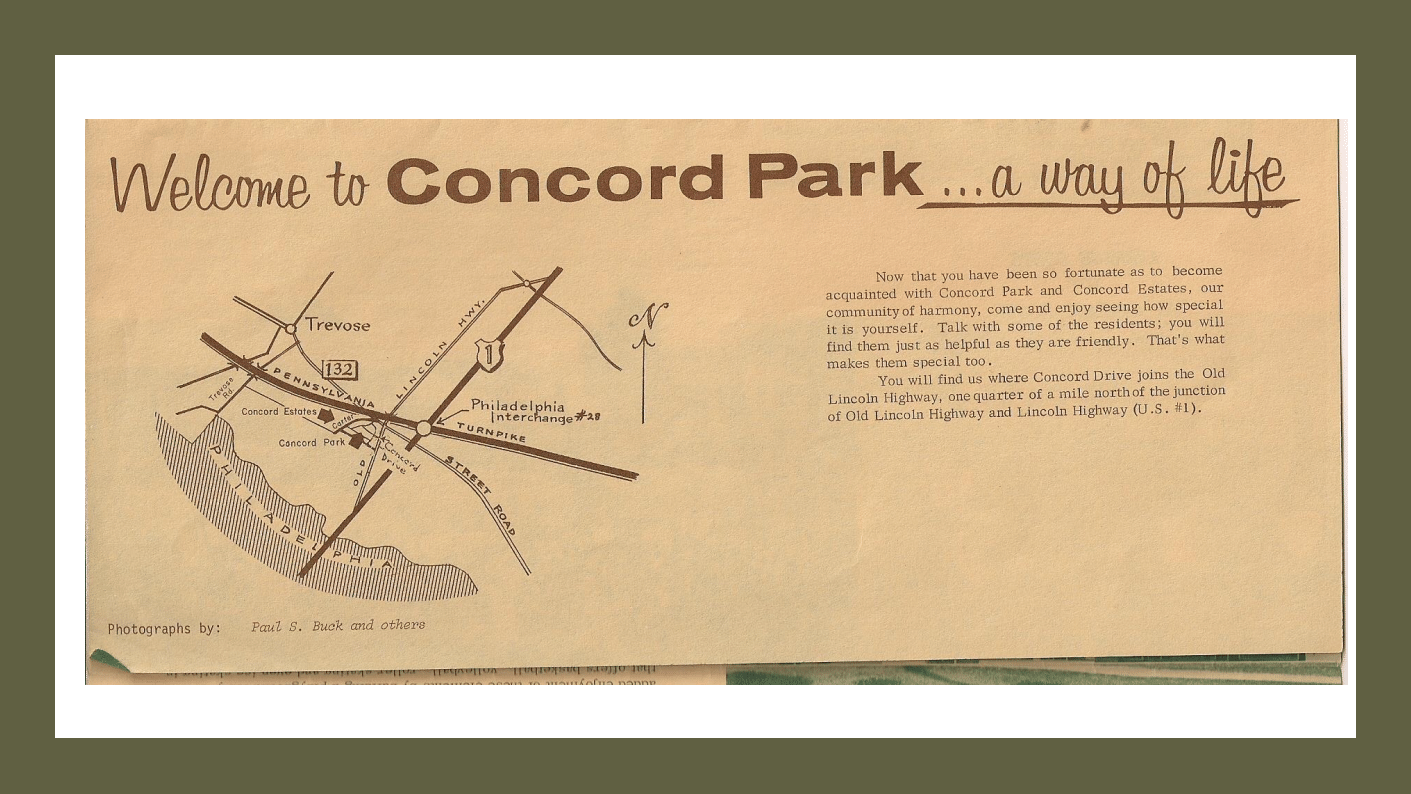

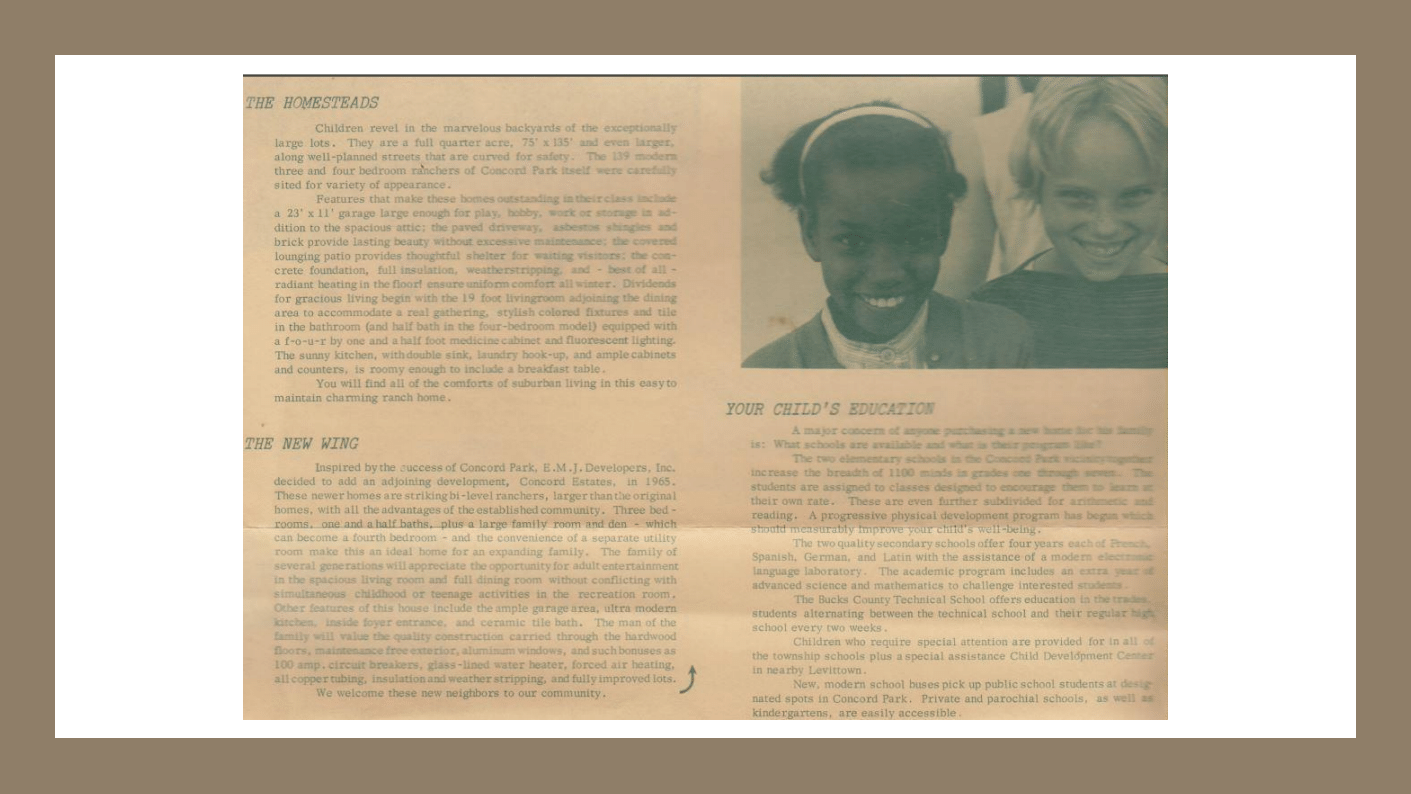
Concord Park brochure community description

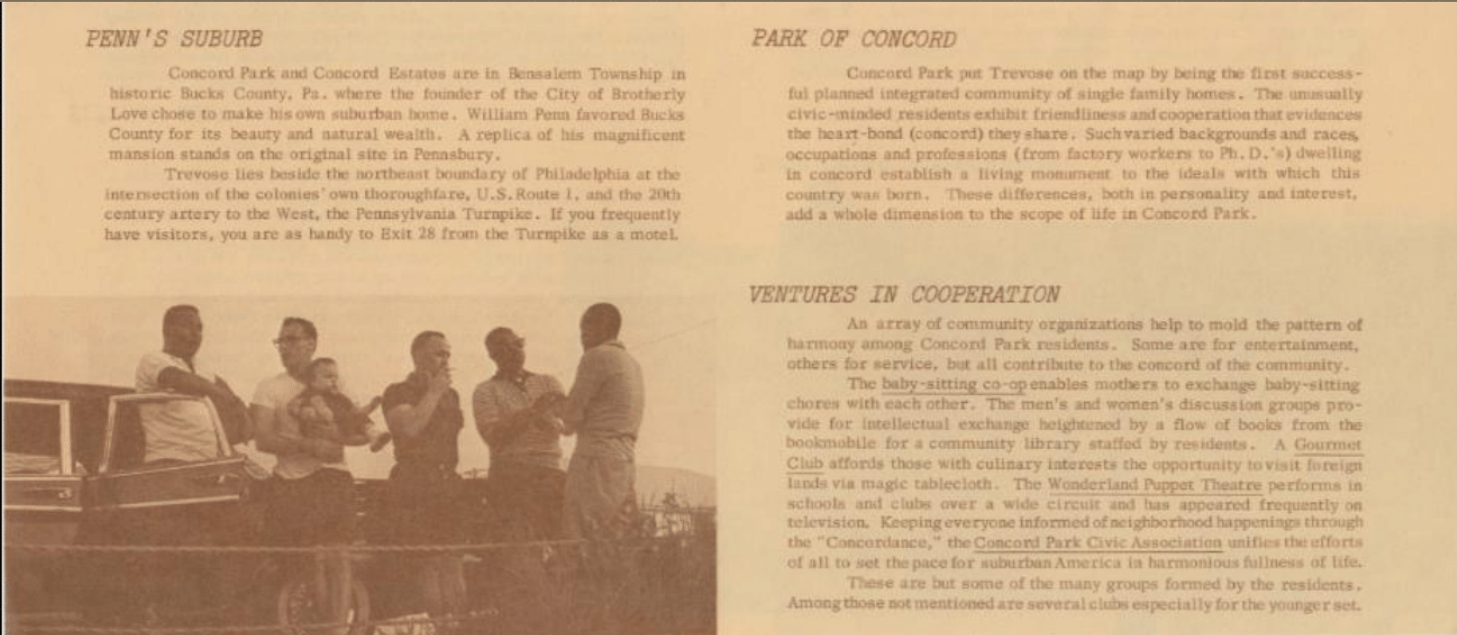

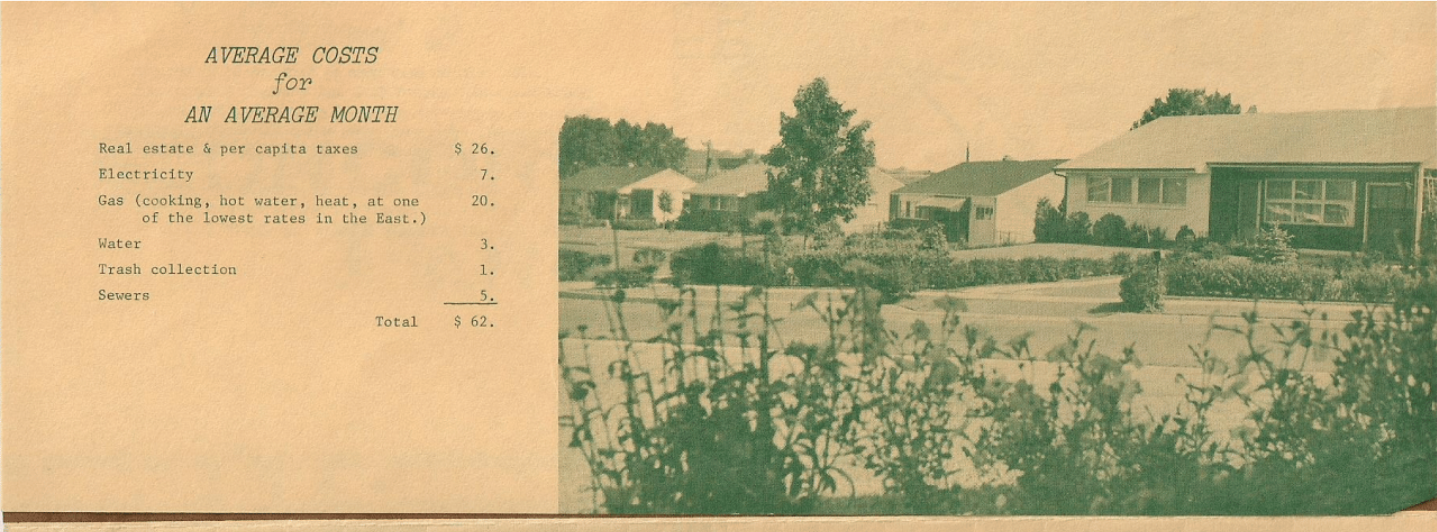

== See also ==
- Greenbelt Knoll
- Morris Milgram
- Housing discrimination in the United States
