= North Avenue Market (Baltimore, Maryland) =

Historic market on North Ave between Charles St and Maryland Ave

Coordinates: 39°18′40″N 76°37′03″W

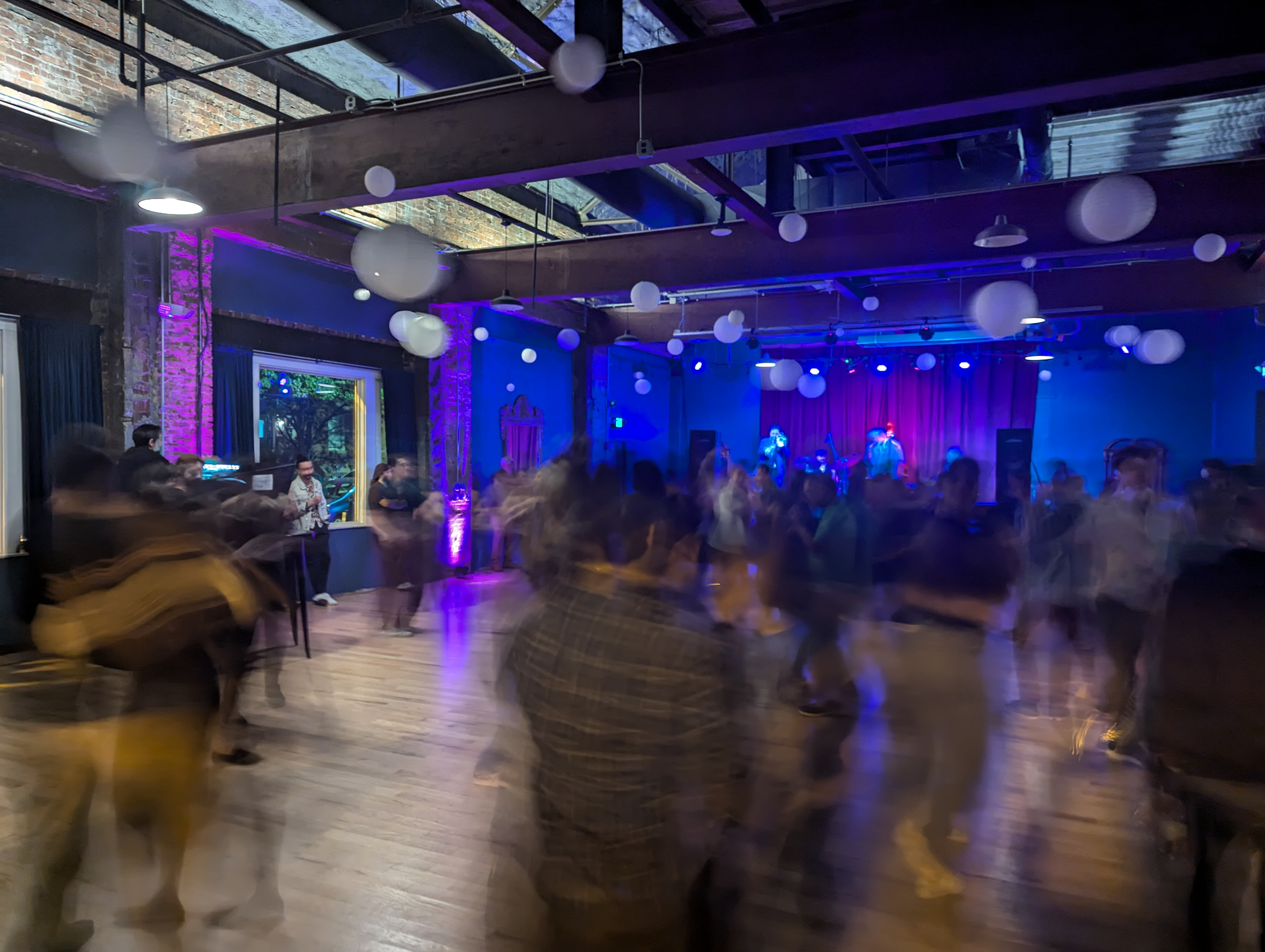
Mobtown Ballroom at North Avenue Market

The North Avenue Market is a historic market in Baltimore, Maryland, located on North Avenue between Charles Street and Maryland Avenue. The market opened in 1928.

When the market opened it consisted of 12 retail shops and, on the second floor, a 22 lane bowling alley. The market's location, at the cross section between Charles Street and Maryland Avenue, was originally the site of two country homes, including the site of Confederate General Bradley Tyler Johnson's former residence. With the rapid growth of North Baltimore in the early 20th century the area was no longer "country". The market hosted close to 50,000 people on its opening day. It soon grew to have over 200 grocery vendors.

After World War II many businesses began to leave the Baltimore city area, to the point where there were only 30 stalls in use in 1968. In that year a fire shut down a large portion of the market.

After the fire, the market was purchased by the owners of Center City, Inc., James and Carolyn Frenkil. The northern part of the market was razed to build a 17-story retirement home, while the rest of the building was turned into a supermarket. The heart of the building remained vacant for nearly 40 years.

In 2008, a $1 million project was created to restore the main market building to create an art-focused group of shops, restaurants, and offices. In 2012, the project received a grant from the Maryland Department of Housing and Community Development and Central Baltimore Partnership to upgrade the facility with new paint, new lighting, and re-open exterior windows.
