= Mobtown Ballroom =

Venue in Baltimore, Maryland, U.S.

Mobtown Ballroom & Café
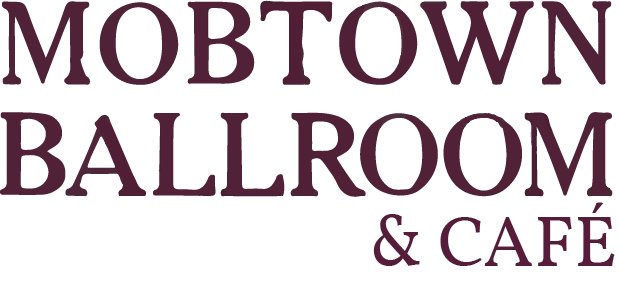
- Company type: Private
- Industry: Restaurants; Social dance; Event management
- Founded: September 2011; 14 years ago
- Founders: Sarah Sullivan; Michael Seguin; Nina Gilkenson
- Headquarters: 30 W. North Ave., Baltimore, Maryland, United States
- Area served: Greater Baltimore
- Owners: Sarah Sullivan; Michael Seguin

Restaurant information
- Head chef: Jake Cornman
- Food type: American
- Coordinates: 39°18′41″N 76°37′04″W
- Website: mobtownballroom.com

Mobtown Ballroom & Café is a ballroom and restaurant in Baltimore, Maryland, United States. It was founded in 2011 as a swing dance venue in the Pigtown neighborhood. In 2023, it moved to Station North and added a café.

== History ==
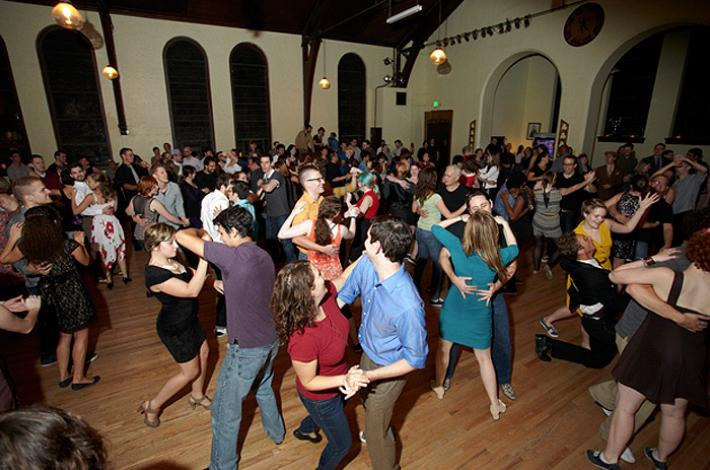
Swing dancing at Mobtown in 2015

The business was co-founded as Mobtown Ballroom by Sarah Sullivan and Michael Seguin, along with Nina Gilkenson. It opened in September 2011 and took its name from a historical nickname for Baltimore. It initially occupied a deconsecrated Episcopalian church at 861 Washington Blvd. in Pigtown built in the 1870s with 2,800 square feet (260 m^{2}) of space. The business enlisted volunteers from the dance community to build a custom 5-layer sprung floor with more than 10,000 nails and screws.

In 2014, following a years-long process, it acquired a liquor license after Bill Ferguson sponsored favorable state legislation that allowed the license despite the presence of nearby churches, conditional on their consent, and councilmember Ed Reisinger helped them get the building rezoned.

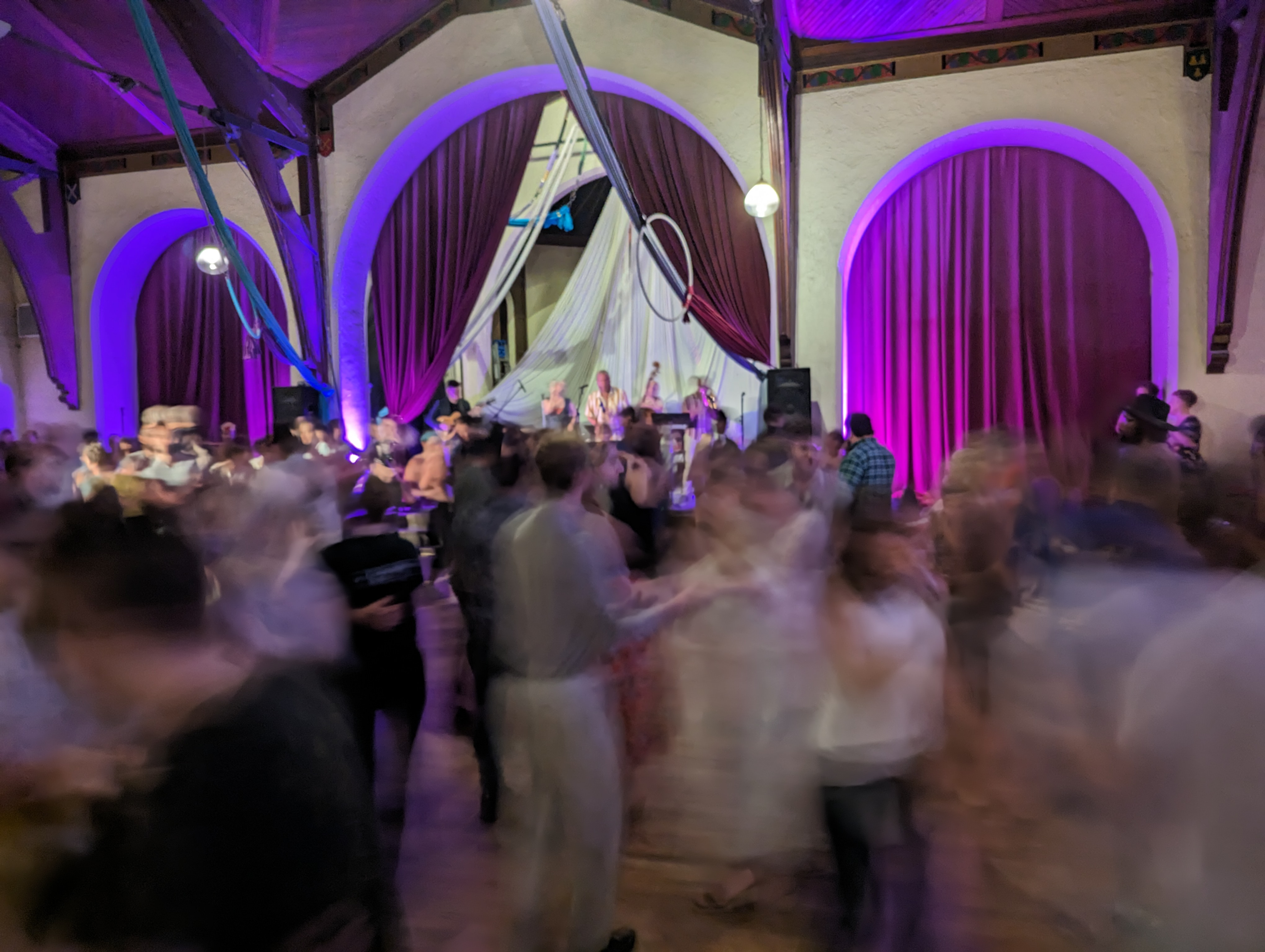
Chelsea Reed and the Fairweather Band at Mobtown in 2023

Gilkenson left around 2016. In 2019, the church space was sold to Stax Charm City LLC. Mobtown came into conflict with the new landlord and in 2023 decided not to renew its lease. It relocated to a 5,000-square-foot (460 m^{2}) space in North Avenue Market (a block-long market built in 1928) in Station North with the assistance of the Central Baltimore Partnership and developer John Renner. The owners added a cafe component because, they said, "food is the number one thing that people gather around". It held a soft reopening in January 2024, followed by a grand opening celebration in April 2024 after volunteers built a new sprung floor.

== Operation ==
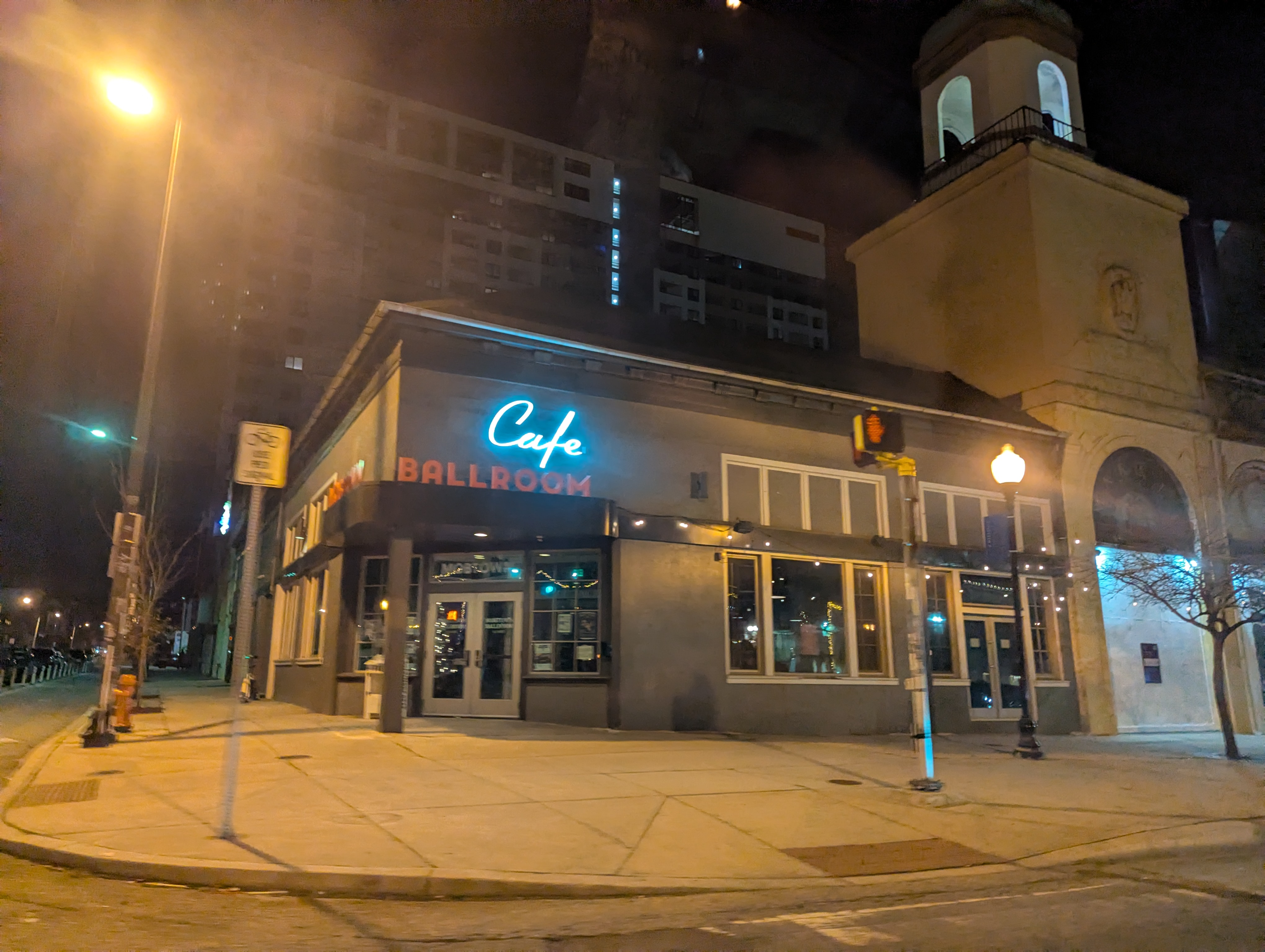
Exterior of the North Avenue Market location.

Mobtown is run as a private for-profit business.

Sullivan said she aspires for the ballroom to serve as a third place and community gathering point. Patrons have noted the close-knit dance community that frequents the ballroom, often drawing allusions to its religious former home.

The cafe is open in the morning and afternoon Monday-Saturday. On Fridays, it becomes the "Jobtown Ballroom" coworking space, with patrons invited to add break time activities to a paper agenda.

== Dancing ==
Lindy Hop dancing at the North Avenue Market location in 2024

Mobtown hosts swing dances every Monday and Friday night, preceded by lessons. Live bands play regularly, and alcoholic drinks are sold. There is no set end time, but some dances extend past 2 a.m.

Mobtown also leases their space for belly dancing and circus arts classes and square dances.

== Menu ==
Mobtown serves American cuisine, with a changing menu to adapt to in-season ingredients. Its head chef, Jake Cornman, described its menu as "Simple classics done right and from scratch". The restaurant serves coffee from Black Acres Coffee Roastery.

Food and drinks at Mobtown

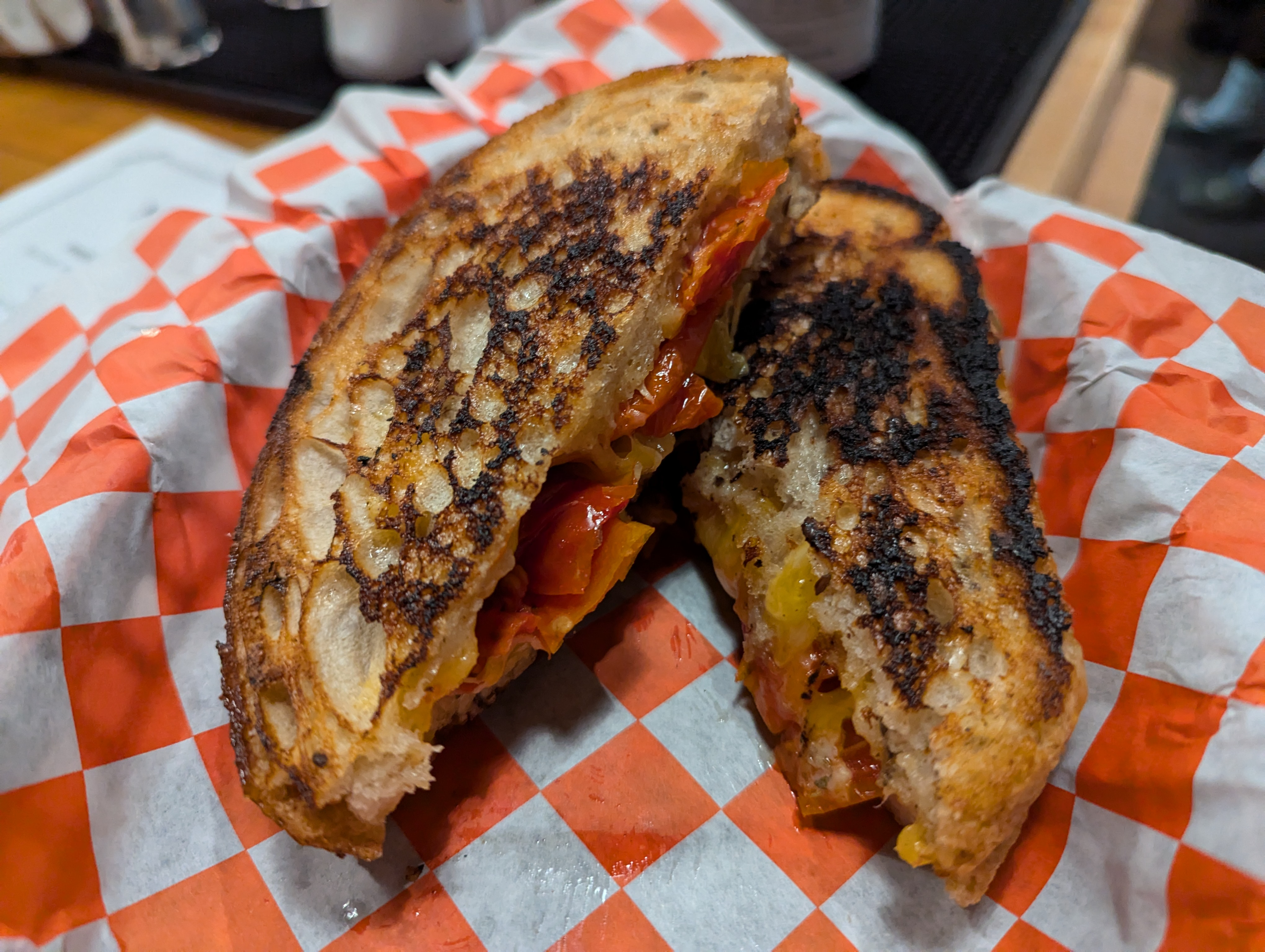
Grilled cheese with tomatoes

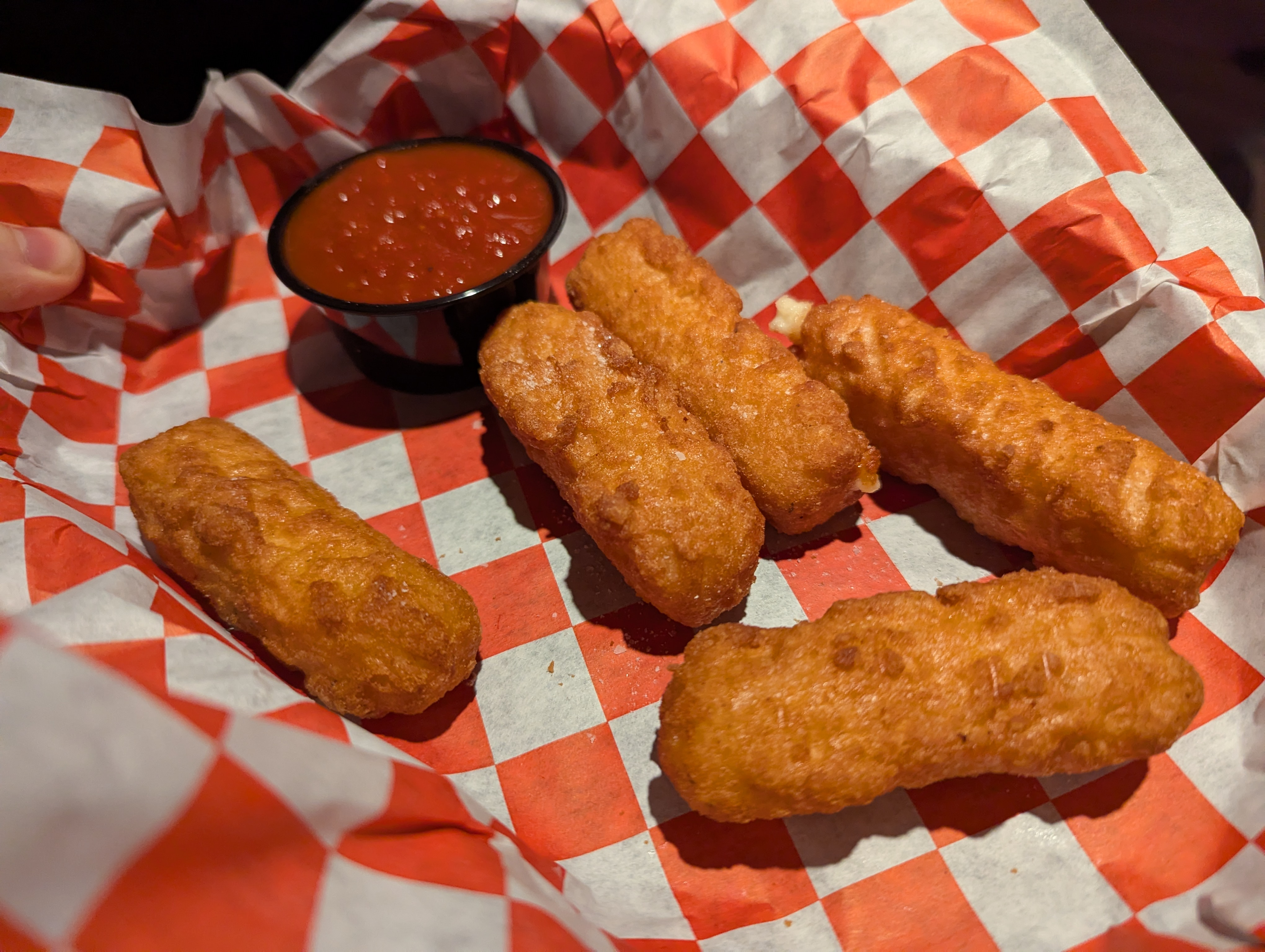
Mozzarella sticks

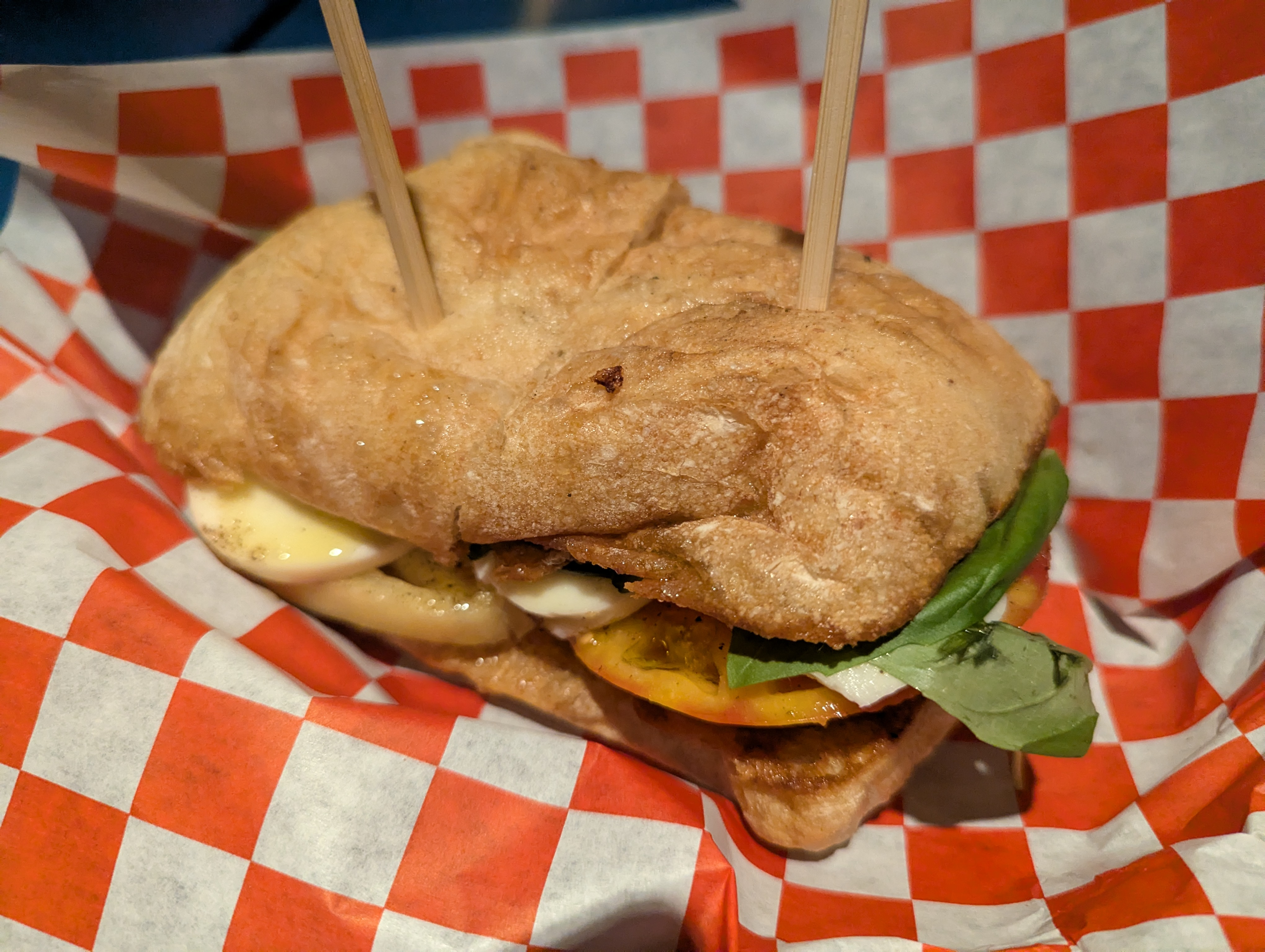
Caprese sandwich

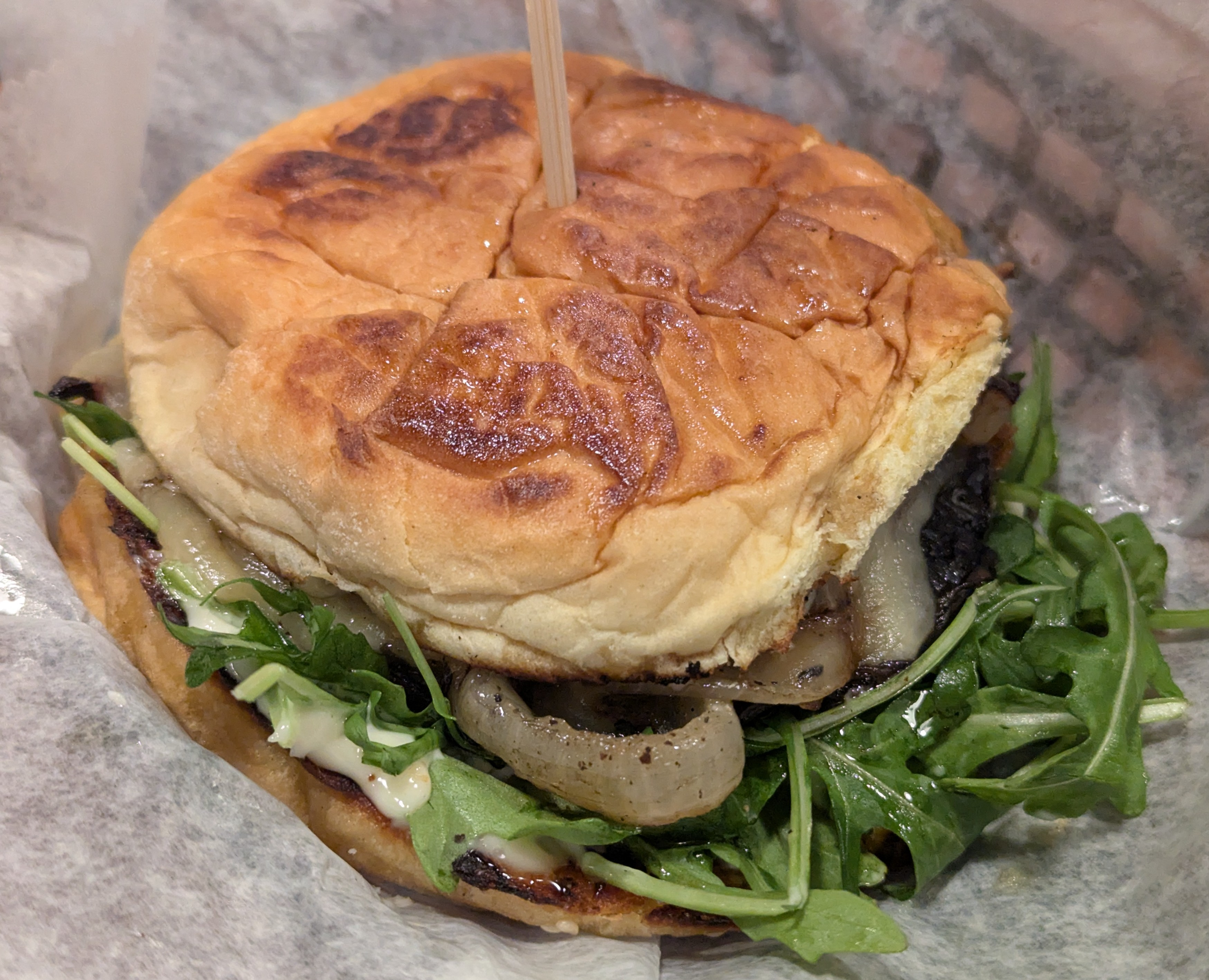
Mushroom sandwich

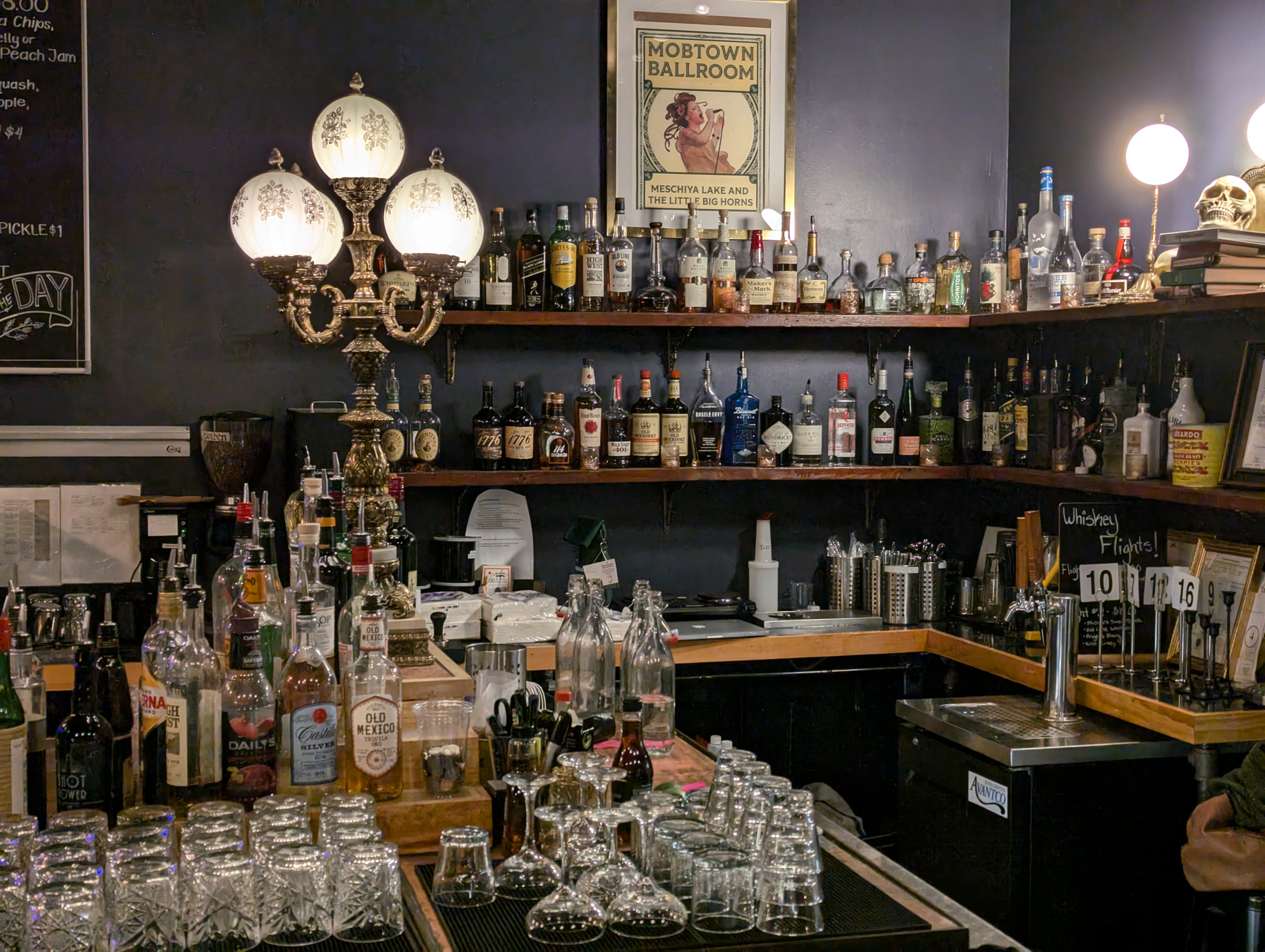
Bar area

== See also ==
- List of restaurants in Baltimore
