= Morris Milgram =

American developer and activist (1916–1997)

- Morris Milgram in 1969.
- Born: May 29, 1916; New York City, New York
- Died: June 22, 1997 (aged 81); Langhorne, Pennsylvania
- Occupation: Real estate developer
- Relatives: Grace Milgrim née Smelo

Morris Milgram (May 29, 1916 – June 22, 1997) was an American real estate developer, civil rights activist, and writer. Milgram built integrated housing for over 20,000 people in several states and the District of Columbia between the 1940s and the 1960s. Milgram was a pioneer in the construction of integrated housing prior to the passage of the Fair Housing Act of 1968, which banned racial segregation in real estate. Notable integrated developments built by Milgram include Greenbelt Knoll in Philadelphia and Concord Park in the suburbs of Philadelphia. Milgram developed the first integrated apartments in Silver Spring, Maryland, as well as integrated apartments in Washington, D.C. for diplomats at the request of President John F. Kennedy. Milgram also built housing in California, Massachusetts, New Jersey, New York, Texas and Virginia.

== Early life ==
Milgram was born in New York City in 1916. His parents were poor Orthodox Jewish refugees who had fled persecution in Czarist Russia and worked as garment workers on Manhattan's Lower East Side. His father was a peddler. His parents imbued him with socialist principles as a child, which informed his later activism. As a young man, Milgram attended the City College of New York, and was expelled in 1934 for organizing protests against Italian fascism. In 1939, he graduated from Dana College in Newark, New Jersey.

== Career and advocacy ==
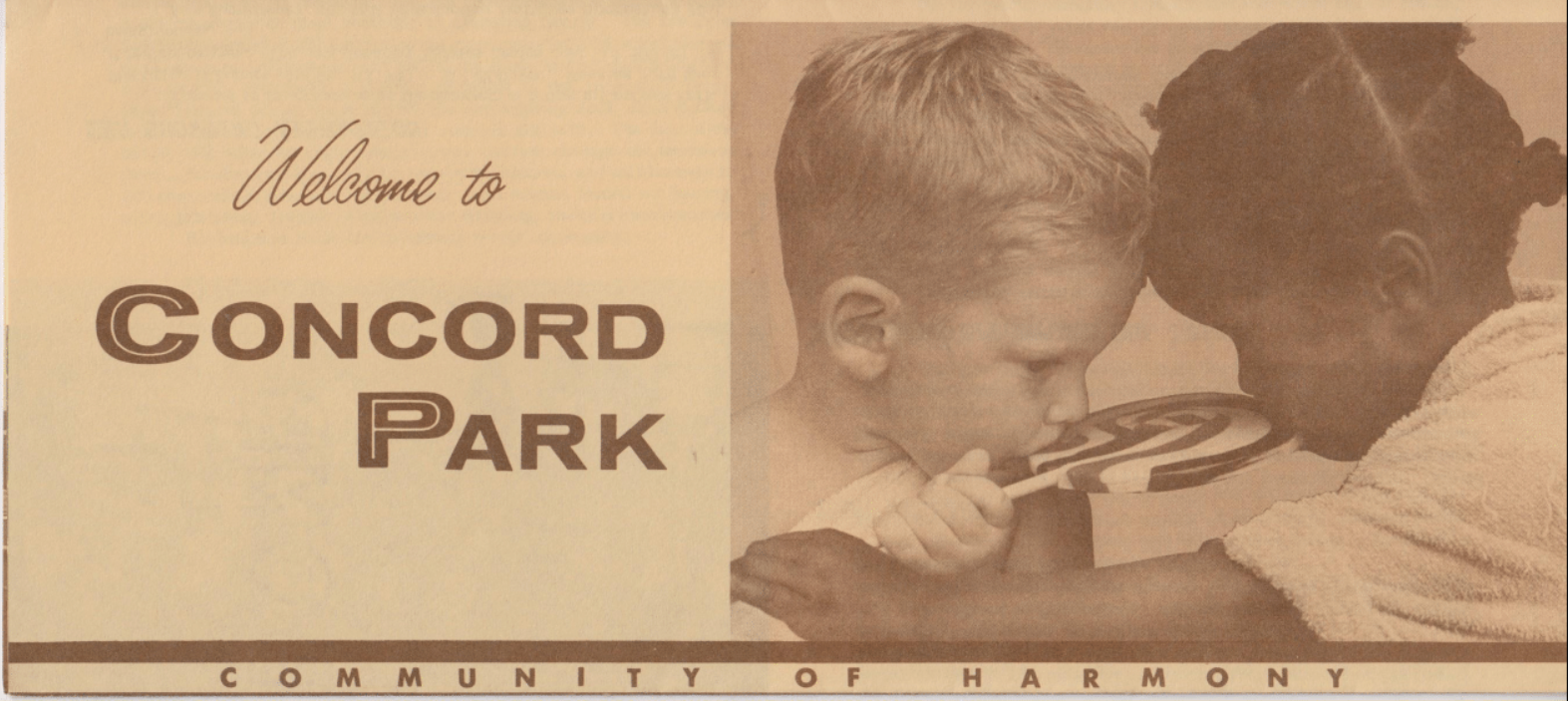
A brochure advertising Milgram's integrated Concord Park development in the suburbs of Philadelphia.

Following graduation, Milgram became an organizer and later the national secretary for the Workers' Defense League (WDL), a socialist and anti-racist labor rights organization. While working for the Workers' Defense League, he met and married fellow labor activist Grace Smelo. Grace Milgram's father William M. Smelo operated a small construction firm in the Philadelphia metropolitan region. After joining his father-in-law's firm, Milgram redirected the company's focus to the construction of integrated housing. In order to attract buyers, Milgram advertised his housing in progressive publications such as The Nation.

As WDL secretary, Milgram attended the 1942 funeral of Odell Waller following his execution by the Commonwealth of Virginia. He was the only white person in attendance, as other white people had been asked not to attend. According to one reporter, "[the black community] did not want 'Odell Waller's murderers' to look on his face in death".

During the 1940s, Milgram and his wife Grace often invited African-American friends and activists to the apartment they shared in Washington, D.C. Southern army officials living nearby took offense to this and convinced Milgram's landlord, who was also Jewish, to evict the couple. The eviction attracted the attention of the African-American press and the Anti-Defamation League.

Between 1952 and 1957, Milgram developed the integrated Greenbelt Knoll neighborhood of Philadelphia. In order to promote his goal of integration, Milgram required that 45% of all homes in the neighborhood be sold to non-whites and 55% to whites.

In 1954, Milgram developed Concord Park in the suburbs of Philadelphia. Concord Park was an early example of an integrated suburban development and was meant to serve as a national model for integration. Black middle-class and white middle-class families moved to Concord Park at a time when many suburbs were exclusively white. Milgram's attempt at integration in Concord Park succeeded despite predictions from some in the real estate industry that integration would lead to racial conflict and declining property values.

In 1959, Milgram tried but failed to build integrated housing in Deerfield, Illinois, a suburb of Chicago. The project was defeated due to local community backlash and the development land was converted by local authorities into public parks.

In 1962, Milgram was asked by President John F. Kennedy to purchase all-white apartments in Washington, D.C. and convert them into integrated apartments to ensure that diplomats of all races would have access to housing. The integration of the apartments occurred without controversy.

In 1975, Milgram and the African-American civil rights leader James Farmer together founded the Fund for an OPEN Society, a housing advocacy non-profit that helped Black Americans and others purchase homes in integrated neighborhoods at below the market rate.

As a writer, Milgram published numerous articles. In 1977, he published Good Neighborhood: The Challenge of Open Housing.

Throughout his career, Milgram received many awards for his advocacy. In 1957, he was honored with the Walter White Award for Distinguished Service in Housing by the National Committee Against Discrimination. In 1968, he was honored with the National Human Rights away by the federal Department of Housing & Urban Development. In 1990, the Philadelphia Commission on Human Rights honored him with the Clarence Farmer Service Award.

== Personal life ==
Milgram was an Orthodox Jew.

== Death and legacy ==
Milgram died on June 22, 1997, at the age of 81 at the Attleboro Nursing and Rehabilitation Center in Langhorne, Pennsylvania. Milgram was survived by his ex-wife Grace and their two children.

The Historical Society of Pennsylvania maintains an archive of Morris Milgram's papers from 1923 to 1994.

== See also ==
- Housing discrimination in the United States

== Bibliography ==
- Sherman, Richard B. (1992). The Case of Odell Waller and Virginia Justice, 1940–1942. University of Tennessee Press. ISBN 9780870497339.
