= Greenbelt Knoll =

Historic house in Pennsylvania, United States

- Greenbelt Knoll Historic District
- U.S. National Register of Historic Places
- U.S. Historic district
- Philadelphia Register of Historic Places
- Pennsylvania State Historical Marker
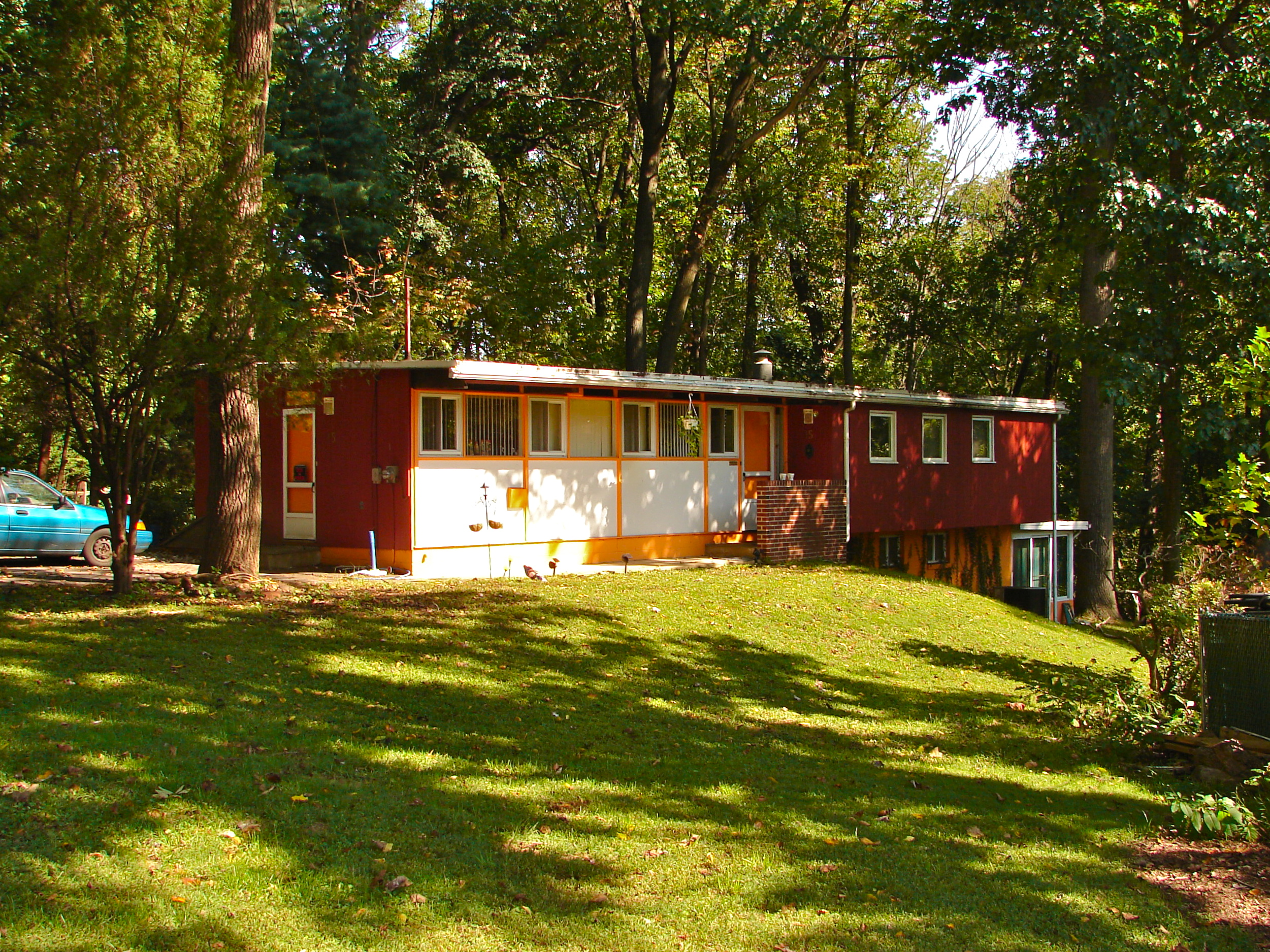
- House in Greenbelt Knoll

- Location within Philadelphia Location within Pennsylvania Location within the United States
- Location: 1–19 Longford St., roughly bounded by Holme Ave. and Pennypack Park Greenway, Philadelphia, Pennsylvania
- Coordinates: 40°3′22.68″N 75°1′19.56″W
- Area: 9 acres (3.6 ha)
- Built: 1952–1957
- Architect: Montgomery & Bishop, Louis Kahn and Harry Duncan
- Architectural style: Modernist
- NRHP reference No.: 10001030

Significant dates
- Added to NRHP: December 14, 2010
- Designated PRHP: June 9, 2006
- Designated PHMC: June 10, 2007

Greenbelt Knoll is a residential development in the Northeast section of Philadelphia, Pennsylvania. Planned and built from 1952 to 1957, it is notable as the first planned racially integrated development in Philadelphia and among the first in the United States.

The developer, Morris Milgram, a leader of the open housing movement, required that 55 percent of the homes be sold to whites, and 45 percent to non-whites. The first house sold in 1956 for $20,000. The isolated little neighborhood included its own swimming pool, which was filled in circa 1985, leaving no trace above ground.

== Design ==
Eighteen (originally nineteen) one-story single-family homes are arranged in a heavily wooded cul de sac on Longford Street off Holme Avenue, surrounded on three sides by Pennypack Park. The simple wood-frame homes were designed in a Modernist style by the architectural firm of Montgomery & Bishop in consultation with architects Louis Kahn and Harry Duncan and landscape architect Margaret Lancaster Duncan.

Greenbelt Knoll won several awards for design excellence. For example, the American Institute of Architects, House and Home, Better Homes and Gardens, and the National Broadcasting Corporation bestowed its Homes for Better Living award on the development. Also, Philadelphia Mayor Richardson Dilworth, an ardent advocate of exceptional planning and design, conferred a City of Philadelphia Tribute on Montgomery & Bishop; he gave the tribute "for the design of Greenbelt Knoll Homes, which ... brought new standards of contemporary residential architecture to Philadelphia."

== Notable residents ==
The original residents included Milgram himself; Robert N.C. Nix, Sr., the first African American to represent Pennsylvania in Congress; Pulitzer Prize–winning African-American playwright Charles Fuller, who grew up here; the Rev. Leon Sullivan, the civil rights activist who developed the Sullivan Principles and hastened the end of apartheid in South Africa; Fire Captain Roosevelt Barlow, a civil rights activist who was one of a group of African-American firefighters to integrate the Philadelphia Fire Department; and Beverly Glenn-Copeland, a celebrated new age folk-jazz musician.

== Historic designation ==
Greenbelt Knoll was listed as a historic district on the Philadelphia Register of Historic Places in 2006 and in the National Register of Historic Places in 2010. The site is marked with a plaque placed by the Pennsylvania Historical and Museum Commission.

Seventeen of the existing homes are considered contributing properties; one home was completely rebuilt following a c. 1980 fire and is considered non-contributing. An additional lot (#17) is now open space, as the house was demolished 1997. Including the 5 detached garages, a studio, and the 2-acre community park that was part of the original neighborhood design, there are 26 resources: 22 contributing buildings and 1 contributing site (park), 2 non-contributing buildings and 1 non-contributing site (Lot #17). The development remains heavily wooded, and both the houses and landscape retain integrity.
