= Woodberry Kitchen =

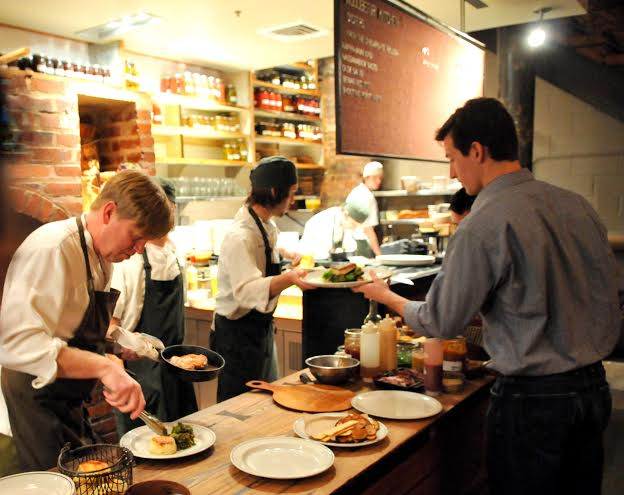
- Interactive map of Woodberry Kitchen

Restaurant information
- Established: October 2007
- Owners: Spike Gjerde, Amy Gjerde
- Chef: Spike Gjerde
- Food type: New American
- Location: Baltimore, Maryland, 21211, United States
- Coordinates: 39.331942°N 76.645221°W
- Website: www.woodberrykitchen.com

Woodberry Kitchen is a New American restaurant in Baltimore's Woodberry neighborhood. In 2015, Woodberry Kitchen's founder, Spike Gjerde, won the James Beard Award for "Best Chef: Mid-Atlantic," making him Baltimore's first James Beard Award winner.

== Restaurant ==
In October 2007, Spike and Amy Gjerde opened Woodberry Kitchen in a repurposed 19th-century industrial park. The restaurant was designed by Charles Patterson of SM+P Architects.

On the heels of the 2015 James Beard Award, Tom Sietsema of The Washington Post described Woodberry Kitchen as "the perfect Mid-Atlantic restaurant", adding, "...Gjerde's food reminds me what a great pantry he has in his backyard. I always think of Woodberry Kitchen as the Chez Panisse of our region."

On November 19, 2026, Gjerde announced on local NPR radio station WYPR that he planned to close Woodberry Kitchen at the end of their lease on April 30, 2027, citing economic changes and that it has "had its run."

== Sourcing practices ==
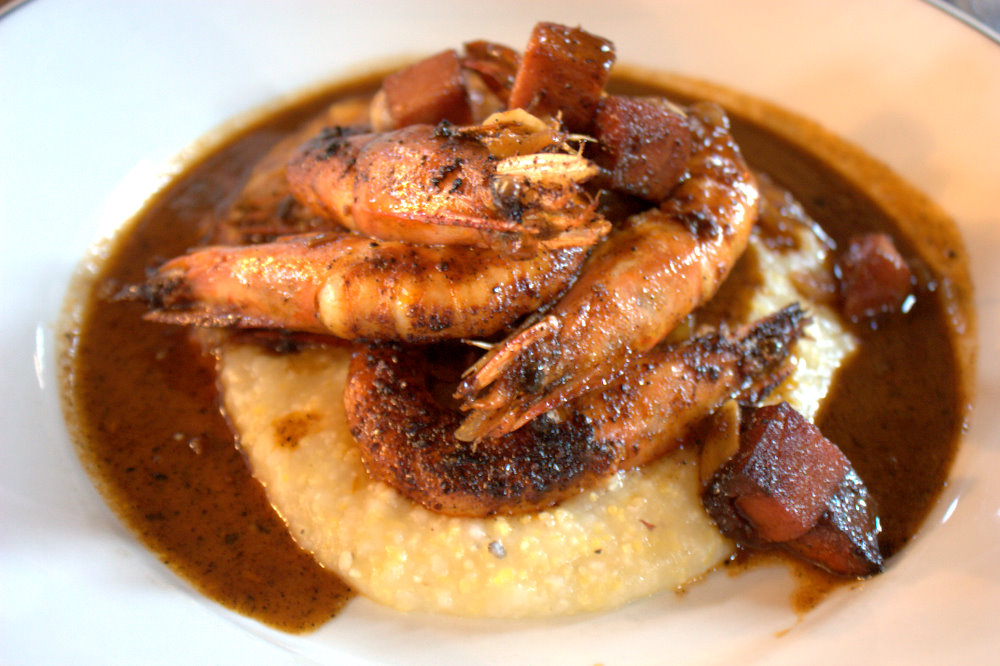
Marvesta shrimp and polenta from Woodberry Kitchen

Woodberry Kitchen is often noted for its commitment to sourcing locally. It is estimated that restaurant has returned over $2 million to Mid-Atlantic farmers and winemakers. Chef Bryan Voltaggio describes Gjerde as a figurehead in the effort to revitalize an agricultural region in jeopardy.

David Hagedorn of The Washington Post notes that the menu lists the "40-plus growers, Maryland and Pennsylvania cheesemakers and local, sustainable fish and shellfish purveyors" whose raw ingredients are utilized each night.

== Awards and accolades ==
The Washington Post awarded Woodberry Kitchen 3 stars in their 2015 Fall Dining Guide.

Woodberry Kitchen was included on Washingtonian Magazine's list of 100 Very Best Restaurants in 2014, 2015 and 2016.

Baltimore Magazine has included Woodberry Kitchen on their list of Baltimore's 50 Best Restaurants every year since 2010.

Wine Enthusiast Magazine listed Woodberry Kitchen as one of America's Best Wine Restaurants of 2016.

In 2013, Spike and Amy Gjerde were recipients of Martha Stewart's "American Made" award, honoring "those who inspire us with their beautiful goods, quality craftsmanship, and innovative ideas."

== Woodberry Pantry ==
Every year, Woodberry Kitchen preserves thousands of pounds of produce for use when locally grown options diminish. This comprehensive preservation program allows Chef Gjerde and the Woodberry Kitchen team to source locally year-round. Snake Oil, a hot sauce made with heirloom fish peppers, was originally processed and bottled at Woodberry Kitchen and is currently sold at retailers in Maryland and Washington D.C.

== See also ==
- List of New American restaurants
