= The Brewer's Art =

Brewery in Baltimore, Maryland

- Industry: Alcoholic beverage
- Founded: September 1996; 29 years ago
- Defunct: February 2, 2026; 6 months ago
- Fate: Chapter 7 bankruptcy liquidation
- Headquarters: Baltimore, Maryland, United States of America
- Products: Beer

The Brewer's Art was a brewpub and restaurant located in Baltimore, Maryland that opened in September 1996. In 2008, it was named by Esquire magazine as the #1 Best Bar in America.

The Brewer's Art closed abruptly due to financial problems on February 2, 2026. The comptroller of Maryland filed a $85,048 tax lien against the restaurant in December 2025, and the restaurant's landlord filed a lawsuit for more than $64,000 in rent and utilities hours before it announced its closure. The Brewer's Art filed for Chapter 7 bankruptcy liquidation later that month, citing at least $1.9 million in debts.

== Beers ==
=== Ozzy/Beazly ===
In March 2014, Ozzy Osbourne issued a cease and desist order to the Brewer's Art, demanding that they change the name and packaging design of their Belgian strong pale ale, Ozzy. The beer is now called Beazly. Named after one of the long time bartenders employed there. The beer is a tribute to the Belgian beer Duvel.

=== Resurrection ===
The Resurrection is an abbey-style dubbel and is made with five types of barley malt and a lot of sugar.

== In popular culture ==
Brewer's Art is used as a location in season 3, episode eight of The Wire, "Moral Midgetry".
