= Looney's Pub =

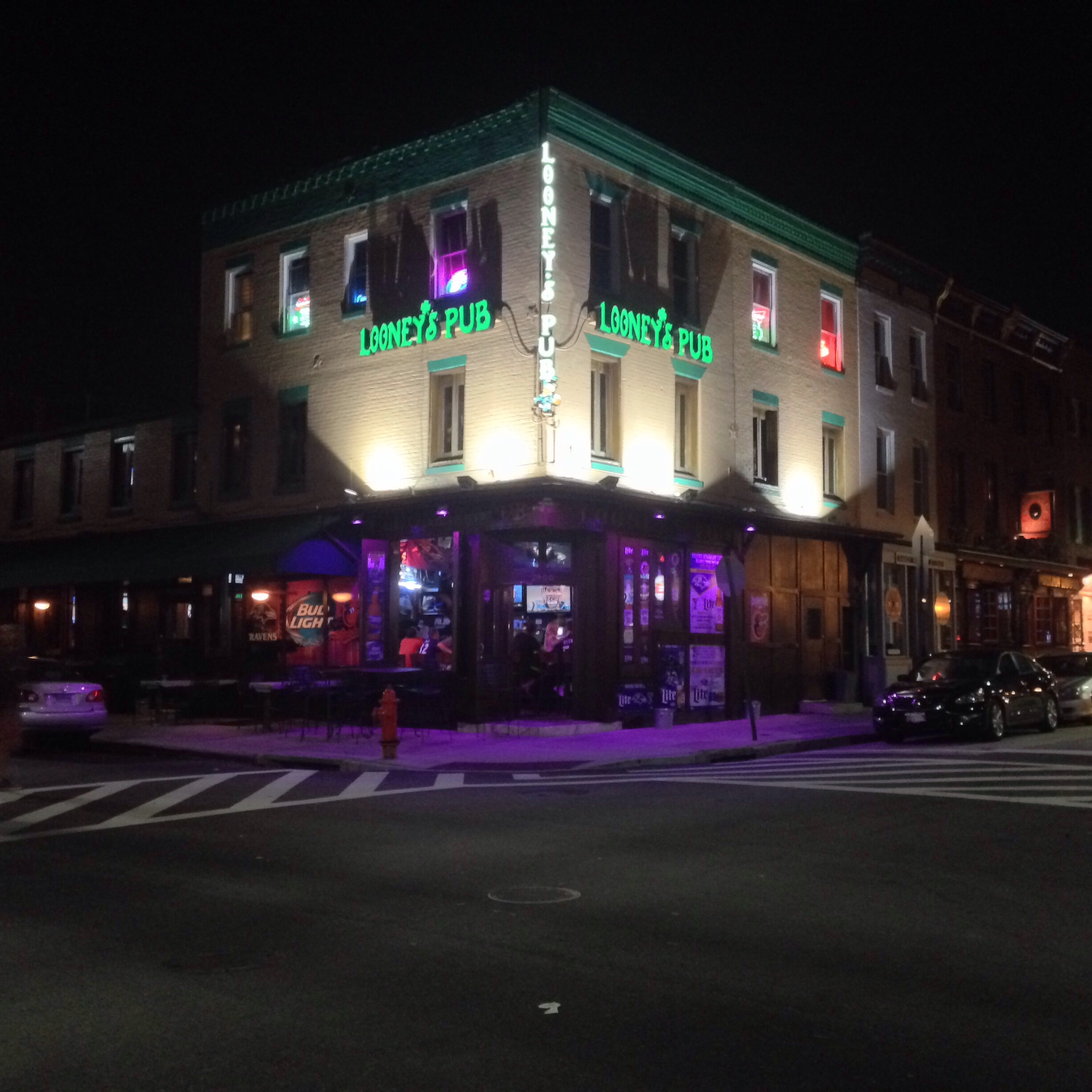
- Looney's Pub, Canton, Baltimore, Maryland

Restaurant information
- Established: 1993; 33 years ago
- Owners: Bill Larney and Steve Litrenta
- Food type: American, Irish cuisine
- Dress code: Casual
- Location: 2900 O'Donnell Street, Baltimore, Maryland, 21224
- Seating capacity: 500+
- Reservations: Yes
- Other locations: Bel Air, MD – Baltimore, MD – Maple Lawn, MD – College Park, MD
- Website: looneyspubmd.com

Looney's Pub is a Maryland-based chain of Irish sports-bars with four locations throughout the state. Looney's is known for its fresh crab options in the form of pretzels, dips and crab cakes.

== History ==
On May 4, 1912, President William Howard Taft visited downtown Bel Air, Maryland where he gave an informal speech at the Main Street Court House. Later, President Taft visited the Kenmore Inn, now home to Looney's Pub – Bel Air where he ate a "hasty sandwich" before heading South to Baltimore to give a speech. Looney's Pub – Canton, the first location was founded in 1993 by co-owners Bill Larney and Steve Litrenta. Looney's is one of the oldest bars in the Canton area. Looney's Pub – North, also known as Bel Air, was opened in the autumn of 2002 in downtown Bel Air, Maryland. In 2017, the Bel Air location began to seek approval from the Board of Appeals in Bel Air Town Hall to build a patio and outdoor bar along South Main Street. Previously, this location was doubled in size, by nearly 5,000 square feet, in 2007. Annually, this location has a workforce of approximately 125 people a year. In 2009, Looney's expanded to the Maple Lawn area of southern Howard County, Maryland. The newest location, in College Park, Maryland adjacent to the main campus of the University of Maryland, College Park in the Varsity Apartment Complex was opened in September 2011. This was the culmination of two years of planning and four months of construction. Looney's Pub – College Park was next door to the now closed celebrity chef Bobby Flay establishment, Bobby's Burger Palace.

== Reception ==
Looney's Pub is successful in each of its four locations. Pub clientele have included politicians, musicians, and athletes including Emmy Winning Journalist and Filmmaker Amber Theoharis, former county executive and councilman, Ken Ulman, councilman Gregory Fox, University of Maryland wrestler, Spencer Myers, and NFL athletes, Matt Robinson and Pro Bowl and Super Bowl XLVII player Vonta Leach. In 2016, boxer Sam "The Vanilla Gorilla" Crossed starred in a Super Bowl commercial with Mike Tyson and Tyson's son, Amir where he got knocked out. He watched the commercial live during the Super Bowl at Looney's Pub – Canton. After playing in the Big Ten Conference, the University of Maryland Baseball team has watched the rest of the NCAA Baseball Tournament at Looney's – College Park to see what their seed would be. On September 4, 2017, Looney's Pub – Bel Air gave the WMAR-TV Good Morning Maryland shout-out.

== Menu ==
=== Food ===
Looney's has a large menu with several items with a Baltimore flavor including the local favorite Old Bay Seasoning. It is known for its Maryland cuisine, including variations of Chesapeake blue crab such as pretzels, dip, and crab cakes, and fries with Old Bay Seasoning. Other menu options include American fare such as New York strip steaks, salads, hamburgers, and Buffalo wings.

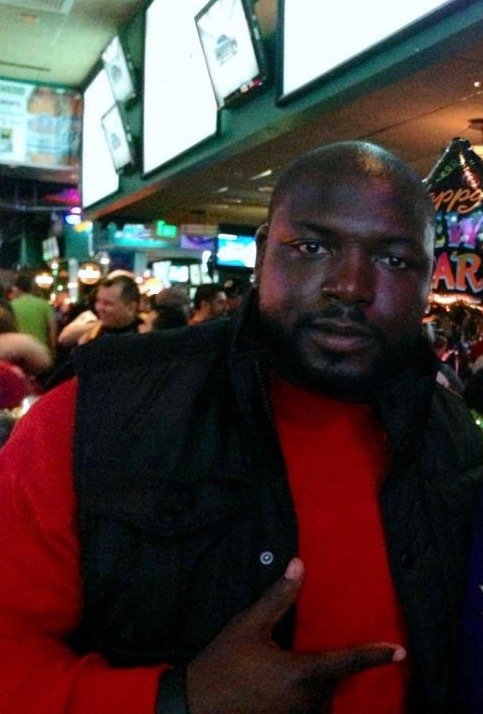
Vonta Leach at Looney's Pub – Maple Lawn.

=== Drinks ===
The Canton location has 24 draft beers and the College Park location has 18 draft beers, two of these rotate between of the Flying Dog, New Belgium, and a variety of macro-brews.

== Sports ==
Looney's pub is a popular hang out for happy hour and for watching Ravens and Orioles games. For locations between Baltimore and Washington, D.C., Looney's – Maple Lawn and College Park, large numbers of fans from each city gather at the sports bar. Game days where both local teams (National Football League and Major League Baseball) are playing, known as the "Battle of the Beltways" or the Beltway Series are among the busiest days of the year. Local teams with large numbers of fans include the Ravens, Redskins, Orioles, Nationals, Capitals, and the Maryland Terrapins. Looney's is a frequented establishment for watching the NCAA March Madness tournament.

== Music and live entertainment ==
Looney's Pub is known for its support of local artists. Every location has a bar, stage, and patio with live music in the form of singers, bands, and DJs playing almost daily. Musicians who have performed at Looney's include the Amish Outlaws, Kristin and the Noise, and Grace Davina.

=== St. Patrick's Day ===
St. Patrick's Day is the busiest day of the year for Looney's Pub. Known as Looney's Patty Party Weekend, Friday-Saturday, festivities include live bands, pit beef, free breakfast buffet, drink specials, giveaways and promotions such as a free Irish breakfast buffet. Irish drinks including Jameson, Guinness, and Irish coffee all have specials. Several locations apply for special permits to serve drinks outdoors to accommodate increased crowds.

== Fundraisers and community service ==
On August 29, 2012, in honor of Patrick "Scunny" McCusker, founder of the popular Canton restaurant Nacho Mama's, who died in a bicycle accident in Ocean City, Maryland, Looney's hosted a fundraiser at all four locations for the Believe in Tomorrow Children's Foundation, donating 30 percent of all sales to McCusker's favorite charity.

In April 2016, Looney's Pub – Bel Air held an all-day Fallen Heroes Benefit Concert for two Harford County Sheriff's Office deputies, Senior Deputy Patrick Dailey and Deputy First Class Mark Logsdon, who both died as the result of a shooting in Abingdon, Maryland, on February 10, 2016. Co-owner Bill Larney remarked that thirty bands volunteered to perform in the two outdoor tents and three stages. Due to capacity concerns, Looneys had to turn away at least sixty other bands. The benefit concert raised $140,000 for the Sheriff's Office Benevolent Fund through an entrance fee, silent auctions, raffles, and children's events.

For the month of May 2017, Looney's Pub – Canton was one of ten partnering Maryland restaurants to raise money for Brigance Brigade Foundation's second annual "ALS Bites!" Campaign. This campaign established by former Baltimore Ravens player O. J. Brigance and his wife Chanda Brigance raises awareness and funds to help encourage and empower people with Amyotrophic lateral sclerosis, also known as Lou Gehrig's disease. As part one of the partners, Looney's Pub – Canton donated proceeds for purchases of O.J. Crushes and the "Brigance" Stake & Crab Sandwich.

Looney's Pub – Maple Lawn hosts fundraisers for local Howard County Public School System schools, especially the nearby Atholton and Reservoir High Schools.

In November 2017, actor Josh Kelly and Brent Connor hosted an American Idol style fundraising event for the Casey Cares Foundation at Looney's Pub – Maple Lawn. Funds were raised from ticket sales and an auction which included sports memorabilia from the Ravens and Orioles, such as a signed Ray Lewis photograph.

== Criticism ==
Councilwoman Christine Nagle (Dist. 1) was wary of the opening of the College park location, noting that in her opinion there is "an emphasis on drinking." Patrick Wojahn of the College Park city council expressed concerns over lack of parking for the College Park location. These were somewhat assuaged with Litrenta's announcement that Looney's would operate a shuttle service to carry patrons to and from the restaurant similar to the service provided at its other locations.

The Canton location was shut down for two days by the Baltimore City Health Department for multiple health code violations. Co-Owner Bill Larney responded to inquires that all issues "[have] been taken care of..." remarking that they were the first issues in 23 years.

== Awards and honors ==
- 2011: "Star of the Industry" Nomination: Favorite New Restaurant, The Restaurant Association of Maryland
- 2013: Harford Award for contributions to economic and civic life, Harford County Chamber of Commerce
- 2014: 2nd place for Irish Pub, Reader's Choice: Best of East Baltimore, Baltimore Guide
- 2014: Best Sports Bar, Howard Magazine Best of Dining
- 2015: Best Bar Food, Harford Magazine's Best of Dining
- 2016: Best Bar Food, Harford Magazine's Best of Dining
- 2016: Best Sports Bar, Howard Magazine Best of Dining
- 2017: Best Bar Food, Harford Magazine's Best of Dining
