= Harry Duncan =

American businessman (1899–1992)

Harry F. Duncan (February 19, 1899 – April 17, 1992) was an American businessman known for founding Little Tavern shops. Duncan opened his first store in 1928 in Washington, DC. By 1939, the chain had grown to almost 50 stores. Their motto was "Buy 'em by the bag."

Duncan donated to numerous organizations and charities via the Harry F. Duncan Foundation. located in Towson, Maryland. Some of his beneficiaries include the Andrew County Museum, Boy Scouts of America, Habitat for Humanity, and American Red Cross. He sat on the Board of Trustees for George Washington University and received an honorary doctorate for public service from the university in 1983.

Duncan was survived by his wife, Anneliese H. Duncan, who served as president of the Harry F. Duncan Foundation.
