= White Coffee Pot =

Former restaurant chain based in Baltimore, Maryland, U.S.

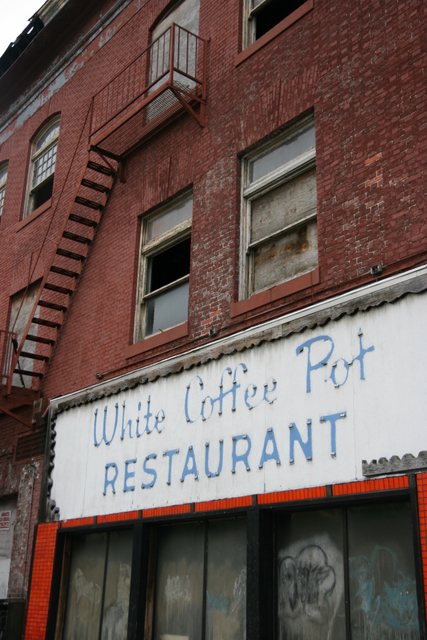
A former White Coffee Pot location

White Coffee Pot Family Inns was a privately held Baltimore, Maryland, restaurant chain and coffeeshop that first did business in 1929 according to Polk's Baltimore City Directory. During the 1960s and 1970s, they opened a chain of fast-food restaurants White Coffee Pot, Jr. Major competitors included national chains Gino's (which sold Kentucky Fried Chicken), Denny's and Friendly's.

The last White Coffee Pot restaurant closed in Brooklyn Park, Maryland, in 1993. The company shared ownership with the Horn and Horn Smorgasbord Cafeteria chain, and some locations became Cactus Willie's Steak and Buffet Bakery.

== See also ==
- Little Tavern, another Baltimore-based restaurant
- List of chicken restaurants
