= Brass Elephant =

Defunct restaurant in Baltimore, Maryland, US

Coordinates: 39°18′1.7″N 76°36′57.6″W

The Brass Elephant was a restaurant in the Mount Vernon neighborhood in Baltimore. It opened in the early 1980s, and closed in 2009 due to financial hardship.

== History ==
In the 1850s, Benjamin Chew Howard, a four term Congressman and son of John Eager Howard, and his wife Janet Gilmore, built and resided in the mansion now addressed at 924 N. Charles Street, which was a parcel of his father’s Belvedere Estate. Later, Charles Morton Stewart, a Brazilian coffee importer and his wife, Josephine Lurman, purchased the building as their winter residence, raising 14 children between the mansion and their summer home in Greenspring Valley, Maryland.

In the late 1890s, George Wroth Knapp, Jr.a local merchant, purchased and used the mansion as his second home during his Baltimore work weeks. He and his wife, Sara Gilfry invested $100,000 on decorative items such as crystal (Waterford), marble (Rinehart), teak (de Forest) and stained glass (Tiffany). In the 1930s, the space was converted into a retail establishment. Potthast Brothers Furniture purchased the building for retail purposes. They reconfigured the first floor that fronts N. Charles Street with stairs leading from the front salon down to a lower level to serve as a furniture showcase to attract passersby. In the late 1970s, William (Billy) Paley, Jr., the son of William S. Paley who grew CBS from a small radio network into one of the foremost radio and television network operations in the nation, led a group of investors to purchase and re-purpose the mansion into a new restaurant. The building formerly occupied by The Brass Elephant was sold at a public auction on August 3, 2010.

== Building status ==
Linda and Steven Rivelis purchased the building in January, 2015 with the intention of operating a restaurant.
