= Little Tavern =

American chain of hamburger restaurants

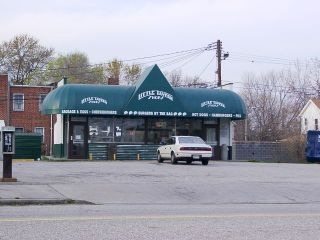
- Baltimore shop, circa 2002
- Industry: Restaurant
- Founded: March 24, 1927; 99 years ago
- Defunct: April 29, 2008; 18 years ago
- Fate: Closure

Little Tavern Shops was a chain of hamburger restaurants in Baltimore, Maryland; Arlington, Virginia; Washington, D.C.; and surrounding areas.

The first Little Tavern was opened on March 24, 1927, in Louisville, Kentucky, by Harry F. Duncan. The first Washington location was opened in October 1928 and the first in Baltimore opened its doors in June 1930. By 1937, there were 33 shops open. At the height of the chain, there were almost 50 locations. Duncan sold the chain in 1981. The chain had troubles in the 1990s and the last restaurant closed on April 29, 2008. The later last-standing Laurel location was re-opened that year as Laurel Tavern Donuts after being given the recipe for the burgers, which it still served as of 2024.

The original slogan of the chain was "Buy 'em by the bag", and its signs promised "Cold Drinks * Good Coffee". The stores were quite small and could accommodate only a few seated customers, while most business was take-out.

From 1928 to 1931, Little Taverns had block construction and their castle design closely resembled White Castles and White Towers of the same era. Baltimore No. 3 was the first Little Tavern to employ the "Tudor cottage" design that would become so closely associated with the chain for years to come.

== Similar chains ==
- White Tower Hamburgers
- White Castle
- Krystal

== See also ==
- White Coffee Pot, another Baltimore-based restaurant
- List of defunct fast-food restaurant chains
