= Alexandria, Virginia =

Independent city in Virginia, US

Alexandria
- Independent city
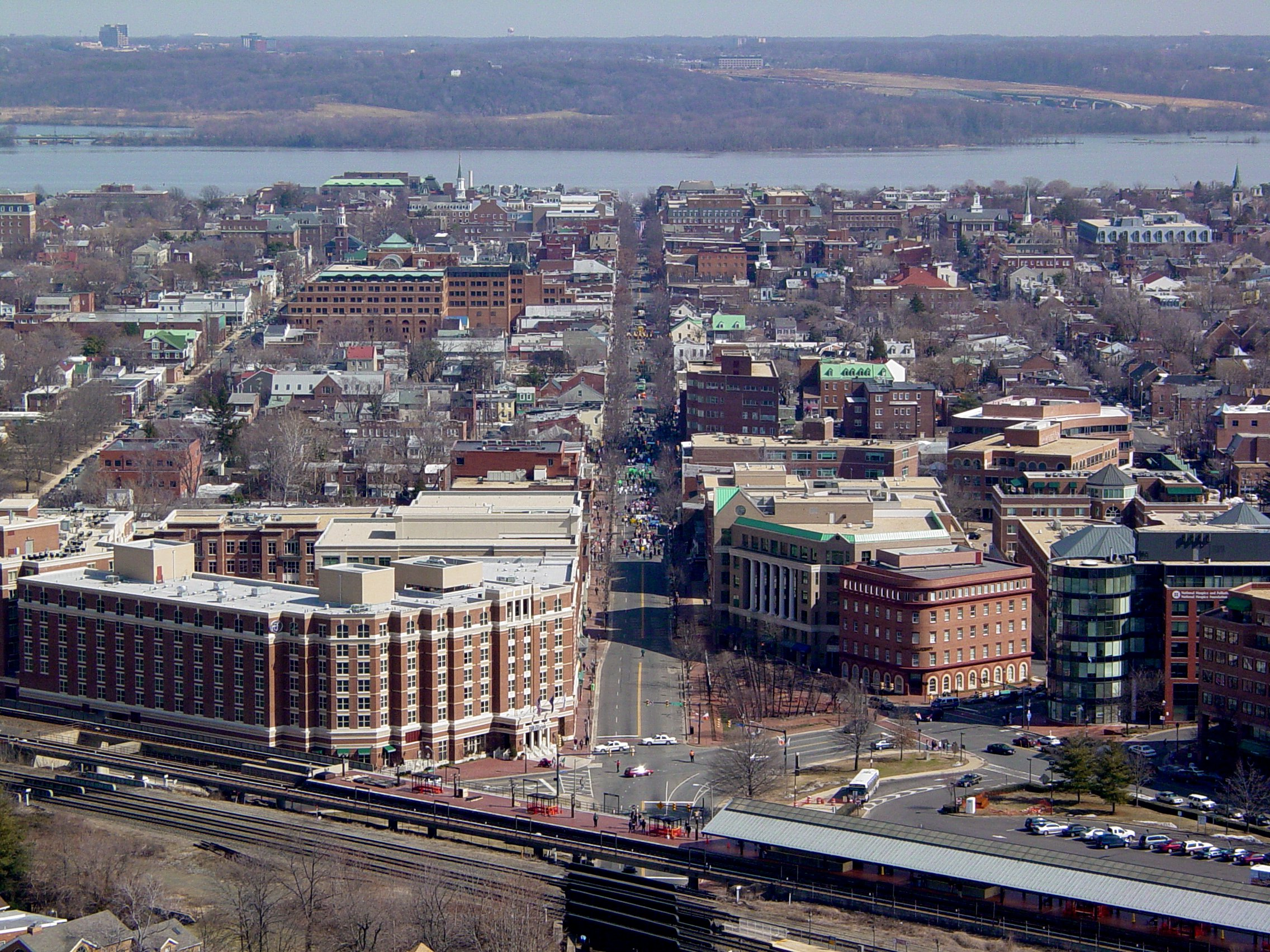
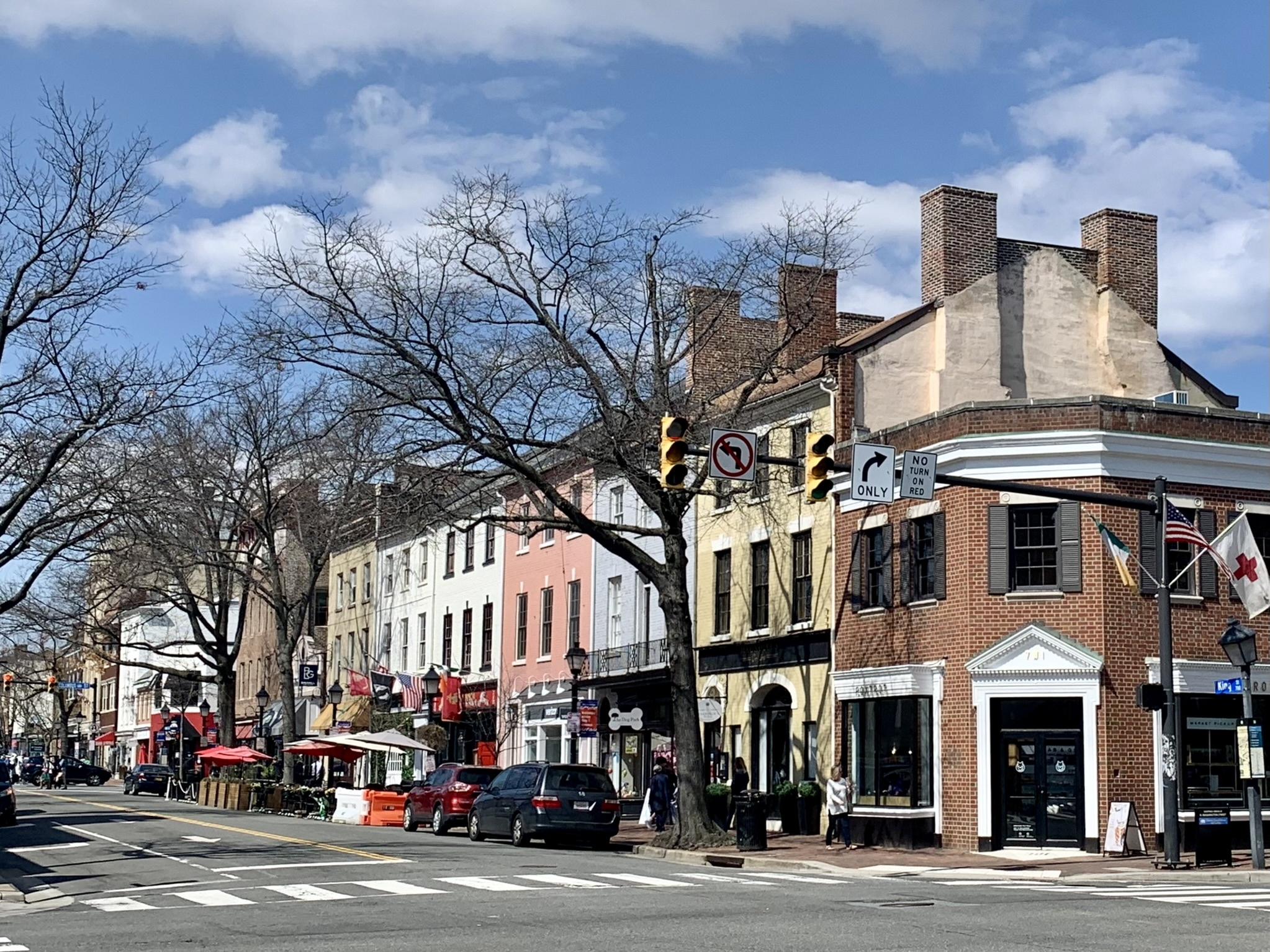
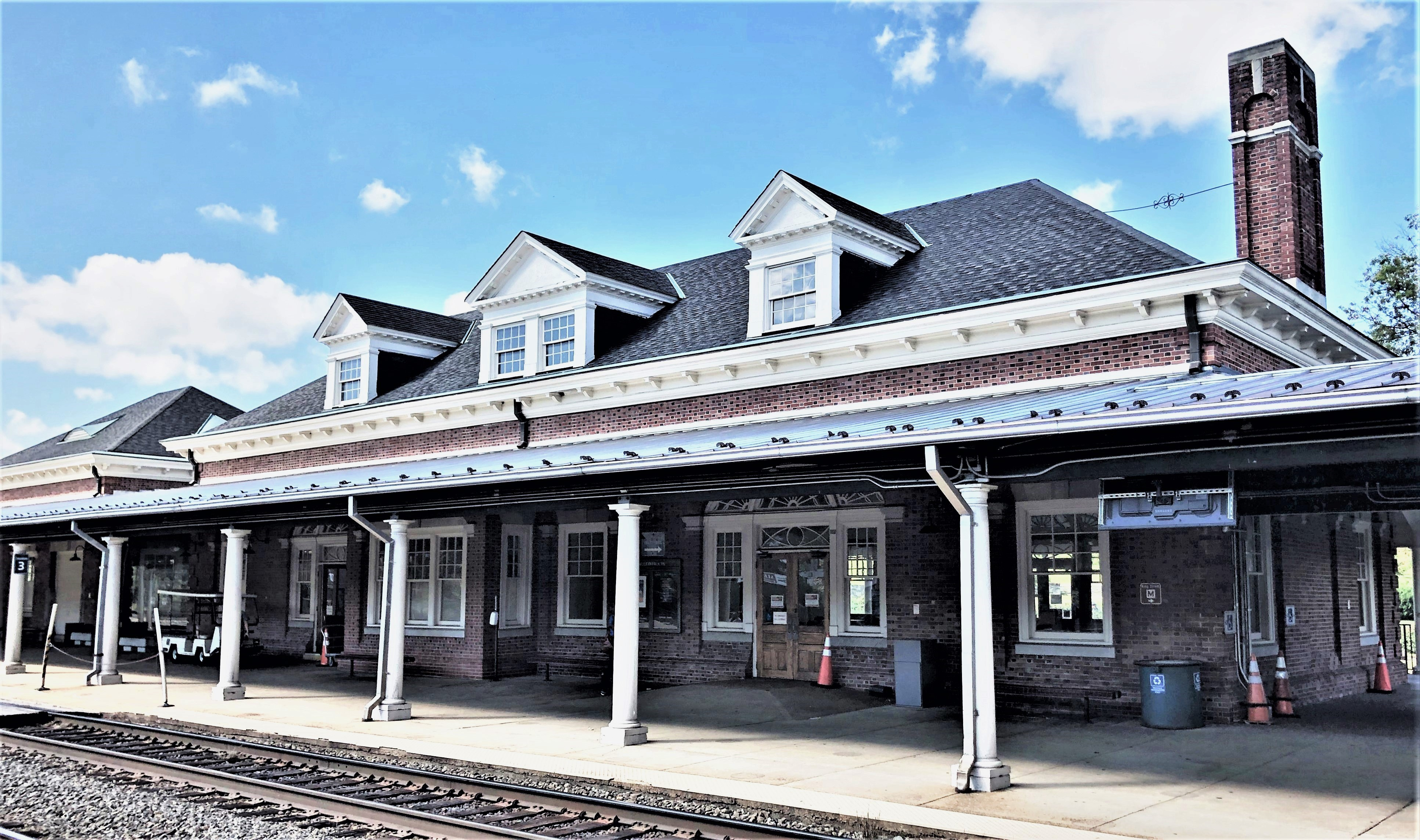
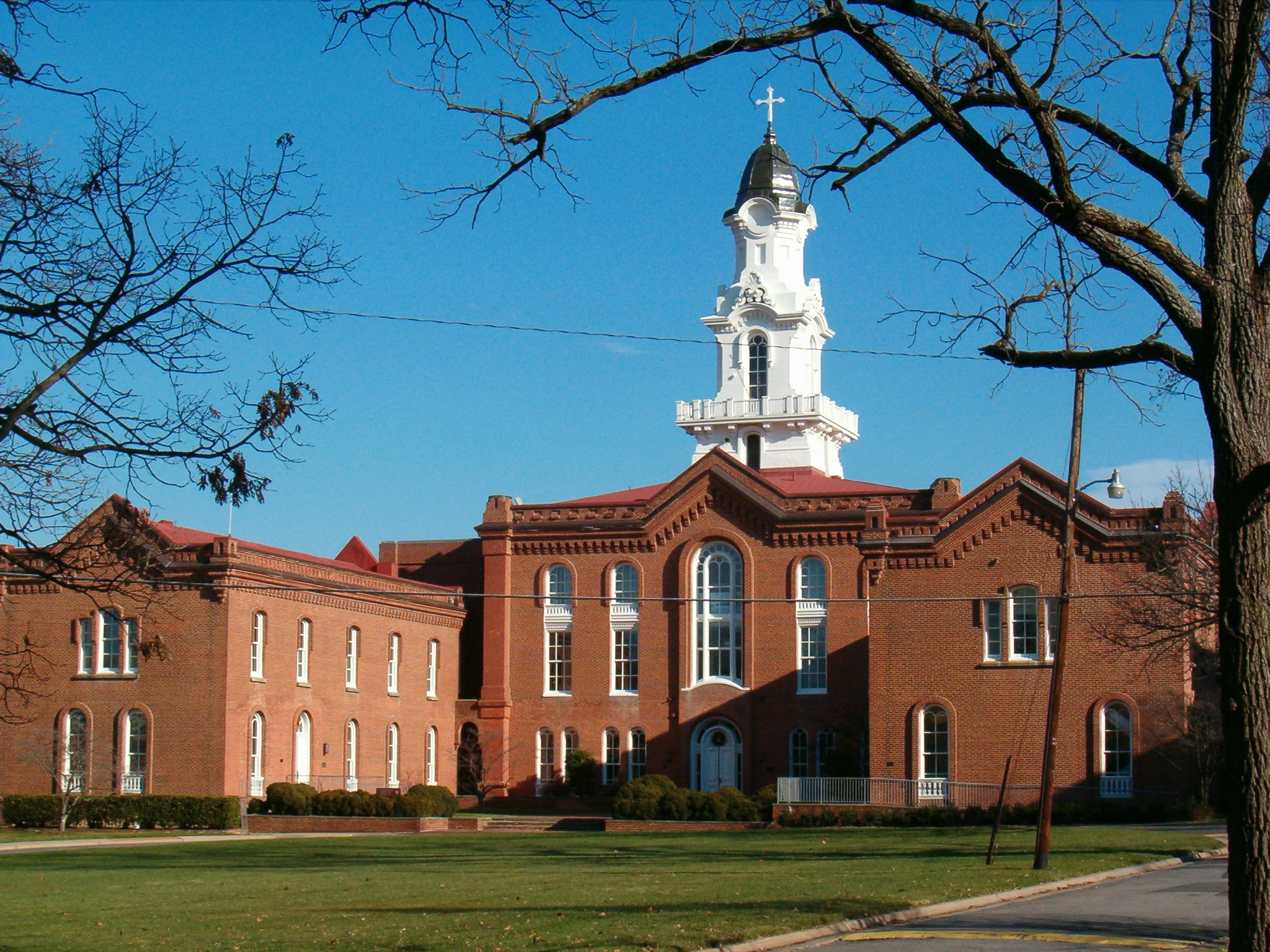
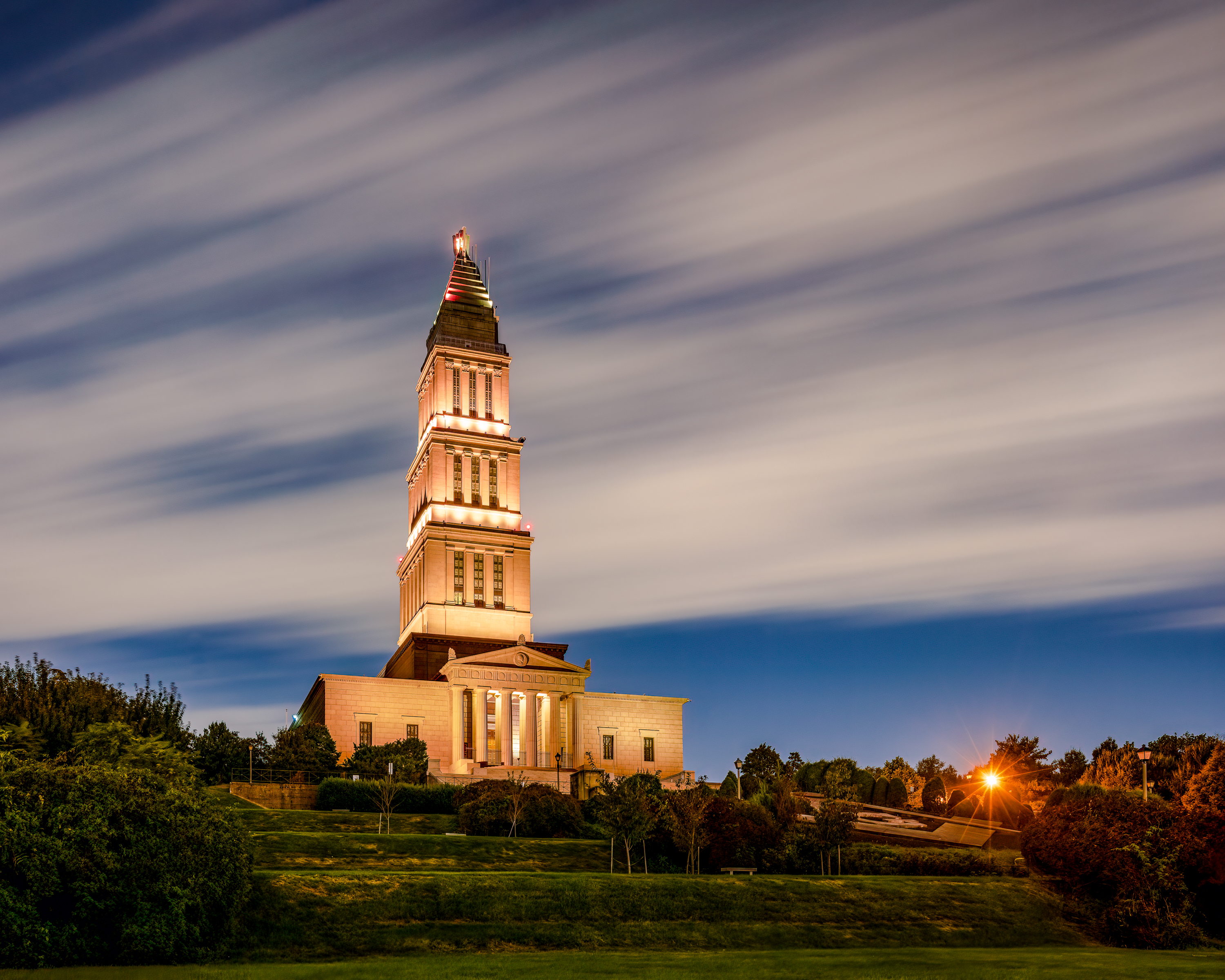
- Old Town Alexandria King Street Alexandria Union Station Virginia Theological Seminary George Washington Masonic National Memorial

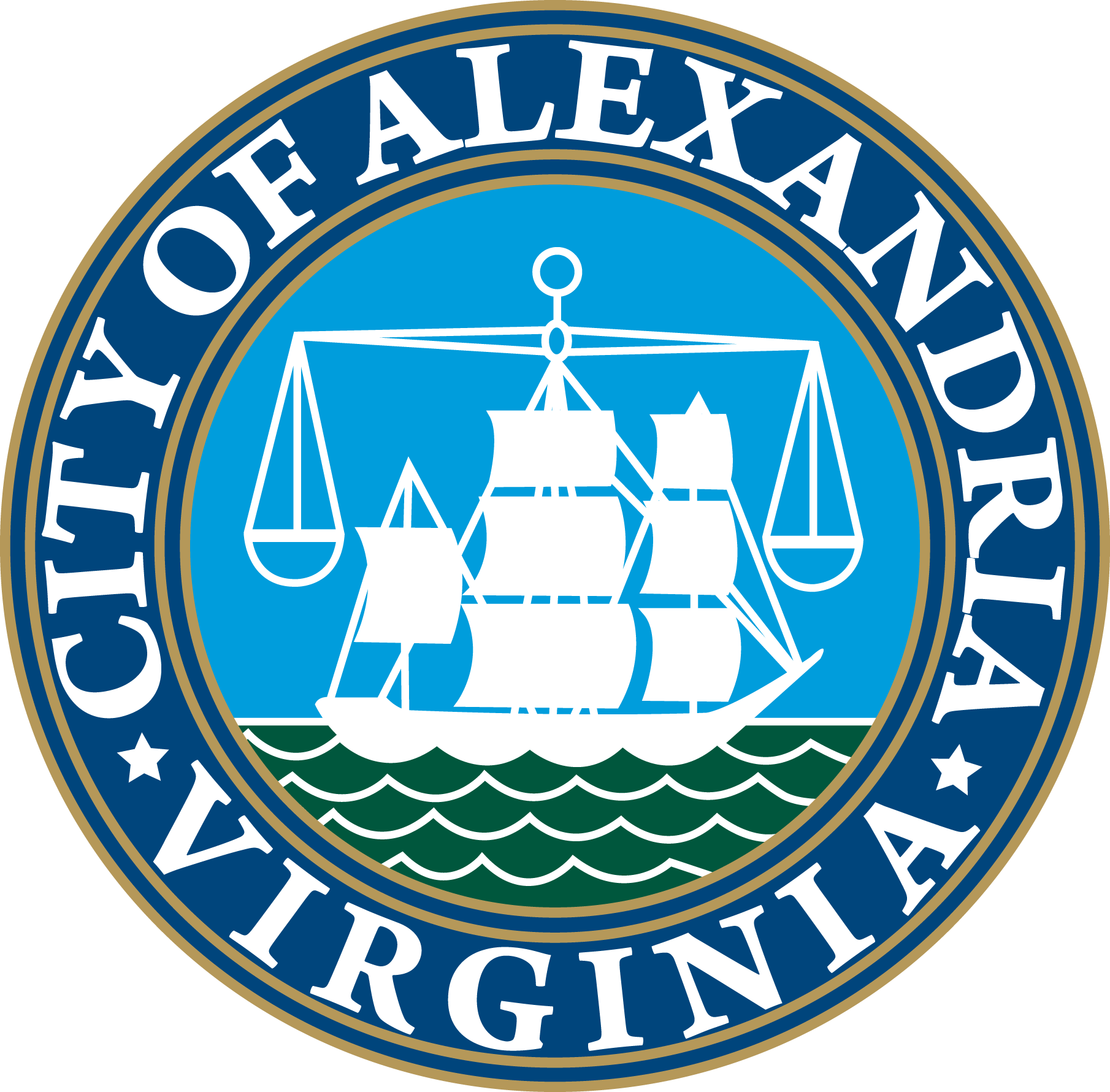
- Flag Seal
- Interactive map of Alexandria
- Location within Virginia Location within the United States
- Coordinates: 38°49′13″N 77°03′01″W
- Country: United States
- State: Virginia
- Founded: 1749
- Incorporated (town): 1779
- Incorporated (city): 1852
- Incorporated (Independent city): 1870

Government
  - Type: Council-manager
  - Mayor: Alyia Gaskins (D)
  - Virginia Senate: 39: Elizabeth Bennett-Parker (D)
  - Delegate: 3: Alfonso Lopez (D); 4: Charniele Herring (D); 5: Kirk McPike (D)
  - U.S. Senate: Mark Warner (D); Tim Kaine (D)
  - U.S. House: 8: Don Beyer (D)

Area
  - Total: 15.35 sq mi (39.75 km^{2})
  - Land: 14.93 sq mi (38.68 km^{2})
  - Water: 0.41 sq mi (1.07 km^{2})
- Highest elevation: 287 ft (87 m)
- Lowest elevation: 0 ft (0 m)

Population (2020)
  - Total: 159,467
  - Estimate (2025): 160,662 ▲
  - Rank: 169th in United States; 6th in Virginia
  - Density: 10,677.8/sq mi (4,122.72/km^{2})
- Demonym: Alexandrian
- Time zone: UTC−5 (EST)
  - Summer (DST): UTC−4 (EDT)
- ZIP Codes: 20598, 22301-22315, 22320, 22331-22334, 22350
- Area codes: 703 and 571
- FIPS code: 51-01000
- GNIS feature ID: 1492456
- Website: alexandriava.gov

Alexandria is an independent city in the U.S. state of Virginia. It lies on the western (or southern) bank of the Potomac River in Northern Virginia, bordering Washington, D.C. to the northeast. The city's population of 159,467 at the 2020 census made it the sixth-most populous city in Virginia and 169th-most populous city in the U.S. Alexandria is a principal city of the Washington metropolitan area, which is part of the larger Washington–Baltimore combined statistical area. Large portions of neighboring Fairfax County have Alexandria mailing addresses, but are administratively distinct from the independent city.

Alexandria was established in 1749 and incorporated as a town in 1779. In its early decades, Alexandria's port was one of the largest in the country, prospering from the trade of agricultural goods and slaves. Ceded to the District of Columbia in 1801, economic troubles led to Alexandria's retrocession back to Virginia in 1847. Alexandria was re-chartered as a city in 1852 and became independent of Alexandria County in 1870. The 19th century saw Alexandria become a manufacturing and railway hub as its port declined in importance. The city significantly expanded its borders in the 20th century, particularly with the annexation of the town of Potomac and its surroundings in 1930 and an unincorporated portion of Fairfax County in 1952, both of which roughly doubled Alexandria's land area.

The highest-income independent city in Virginia, Alexandria is heavily influenced by its proximity to the national capital. The expansion of the U.S. federal government during the New Deal and World War II, coupled with postwar deindustrialization, helped transform Alexandria into a community for federal employees. The city's largest employers include the U.S. Department of Defense's Mark Center and the U.S. Patent and Trademark Office. Numerous nonprofit organizations and private corporations are also headquartered in Alexandria. Tourism is a major industry, particularly in the city's traditional core of Old Town. Old Town hosts the Alexandria Historic District, the third historic district in the United States.

== History ==
=== Early history ===
According to archaeologists' estimates, a succession of indigenous peoples began to occupy the Chesapeake and Tidewater region about 3,000 to 10,000 years ago. Various Algonquian-speaking peoples inhabited the lands in the Potomac River drainage area since at least the early 14th century.

In the summer of 1608, English settler John Smith explored the Potomac River and came into contact with the Patawomeck (loosely affiliated with the Powhatan) and Doeg tribes who lived on the Virginia side, as well as on Theodore Roosevelt Island, and the Piscataway (also known as the Conoy), who resided on the Maryland side. On this visit, Smith recorded the presence of a settlement called Assaomeck near the south bank of what is now Hunting Creek.

=== Colonial era ===
On October 21, 1669, a patent granted 6,000 acres (24 km^{2}) to Robert Howsing for transporting 120 people to the Colony of Virginia; this land would eventually become Alexandria. Virginia's comprehensive Tobacco Inspection Law of 1730 mandated that all tobacco grown in the colony must be brought to locally designated public warehouses for inspection before sale. One of the sites designated for a warehouse on the upper Potomac River was at the mouth of Hunting Creek. After the original site south of the creek was deemed "very inconvenient", the warehouse was built at West's Point to the north. This land had been given to John Alexander and Hugh West by John's father Robert Alexander. Robert's cousin, Philip Alexander, owned a 500 acres (2.0 km^{2}) estate to the south, which was bounded by Hunting Creek, Hooff's Run, the Potomac River, and the future Cameron Street.

In 1742, Fairfax County was split from Prince William County. Local planters and merchants, including Thomas Fairfax and Lawrence Washington, sought to establish a port for the new county. At the opening of Virginia's 1748–49 legislative session, the House of Burgesses received a petition on November 1, 1748 that stated that the "inhabitants of Fairfax (Co.) praying that a town may be established at Hunting Creek Warehouse on Potowmack River". Lawrence's younger brother George Washington, an aspiring surveyor, made a sketch of the shoreline touting the advantages of the tobacco warehouse site. Opponents of the warehouse site submitted a petition asking for the small settlement of Cameron along Hunting Creek to be selected instead. Both of these original petitions were rejected by the House of Burgesses.

John West, Fairfax County surveyor, laid-out 60 acres (assisted by 17-year-old George Washington).On May 2, 1749, the House of Burgesses approved the river location and ordered "Mr. Washington do go up with a Message to the Council and acquaint them that this House have agreed to the Amendments titled An Act for erecting a Town at Hunting Creek Warehouse, in the County of Fairfax". A "Public Vendue" (auction) was advertised for July, and the county surveyor laid out street lanes and town lots. The auction was conducted on July 13–14, 1749. The Fairfax County Court began meeting in Alexandria's Market Square in 1752.

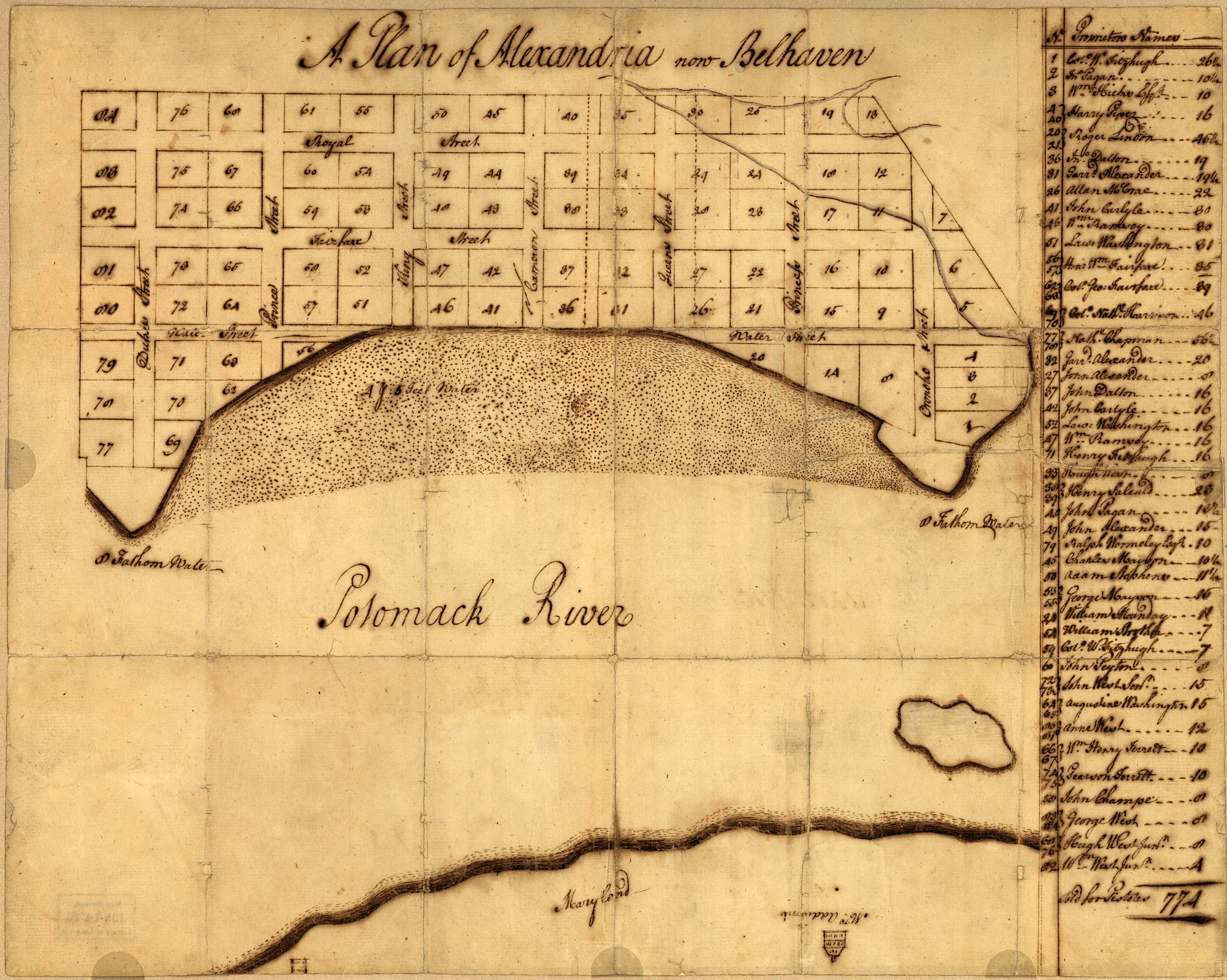
"A Plan of Alexandria now Belhaven" by George Washington, 1749

Alexandria is named in honor of the early owner of much of the land, Scotsman John Alexander. This was likely chosen to try to win the support of the Alexander family. If so, the effort failed, as Philip Alexander endorsed the Cameron site. The city government further connects the name to the Egyptian city of Alexandria, which would have appealed to the "classically educated elites of the day". An alternative designation for the town was "Belhaven", with the first known use of the name being a 1749 plat entitled "A Plan of Alexandria now Belhaven". The name was intended to honor Scottish anti-unionist John Hamilton, 2nd Lord Belhaven and Stenton, as "patriotic" Scottish merchants were active along the Potomac at the time. The name Belhaven was used in official lotteries to raise money for a church and market house. Though the alternative name did not find lasting success, some maps continued to label the town as Belhaven as late as 1783.

In March 1755, Edward Braddock arrived in Alexandria with a force of about 1400 British regulars and 450 colonial troops as he prepared for operations against the French during the French and Indian War. There, he hosted a meeting with the governors of Virginia, Maryland, Pennsylvania, Massachusetts, and New York at Carlyle House to discuss the war. His army subsequently departed Alexandria for an expedition against Fort Duquesne that ended in Braddock's defeat and death against a French and Native American force.

=== American Revolution ===
In 1774, the British closure of Boston Harbor prompted pro-Boston Alexandrians, including John Carlyle, to establish a committee of correspondence. On July 18 of that year, George Washington, George Mason, and other residents of Fairfax County met at Alexandria's Market Square to issue the Fairfax Resolves, which called for a congress of colonial representatives and a boycott of British goods. After the American Revolutionary War began in 1775, Alexandria remained sympathetic towards the revolutionaries, supplying the colonial military with troops and purging local Loyalists. The town was "virtually unscathed" by combat, but nonetheless was a hub of military activity, hosting a Hessian prisoner of war camp, numerous fortifications to defend against British attack, and a smallpox vaccination center for the Southern Department. The sale of grain and other foodstuffs to revolutionary troops and their French backers provided a significant boost to Alexandria's economy.

The revolutionary government of Virginia began chartering and re-chartering many of its communities amidst the conflict. Under this effort, Alexandria was formally incorporated as a town in December 1779. The town's trustees were replaced by directly elected officials, including a six-man common council as well as a Court of Hustings consisting of a mayor, a recorder, and four aldermen.

1779 also saw Virginia designate Alexandria as an international port of entry with its own customs system. As the war came to a conclusion, Alexandria's export of flour and tobacco greatly increased. Trade with Europe, which was the destination of about half of the town's exports, was reestablished, while the West Indies served as another major customer of Alexandrian goods. A decline in tobacco production caused economic contraction in the late 1780s, but trade rapidly recovered in the 1790s. Alexandria was the dominant port along the Potomac by 1790 and was the seventh-largest port in the United States by 1796.

In March 1785, commissioners from Virginia and Maryland met in Alexandria to discuss the commercial relations of the two states, finishing their business at Mount Vernon. The Mount Vernon Conference concluded on March 28 with an agreement for freedom of trade and freedom of navigation of the Potomac River. The Maryland legislature, in ratifying this agreement on November 22, proposed a conference among representatives from all the states to consider the adoption of definite commercial regulations. This led to the calling of the Annapolis Convention of 1786, which in turn led to the calling of the Federal Convention of 1787.

=== As part of the District of Columbia ===
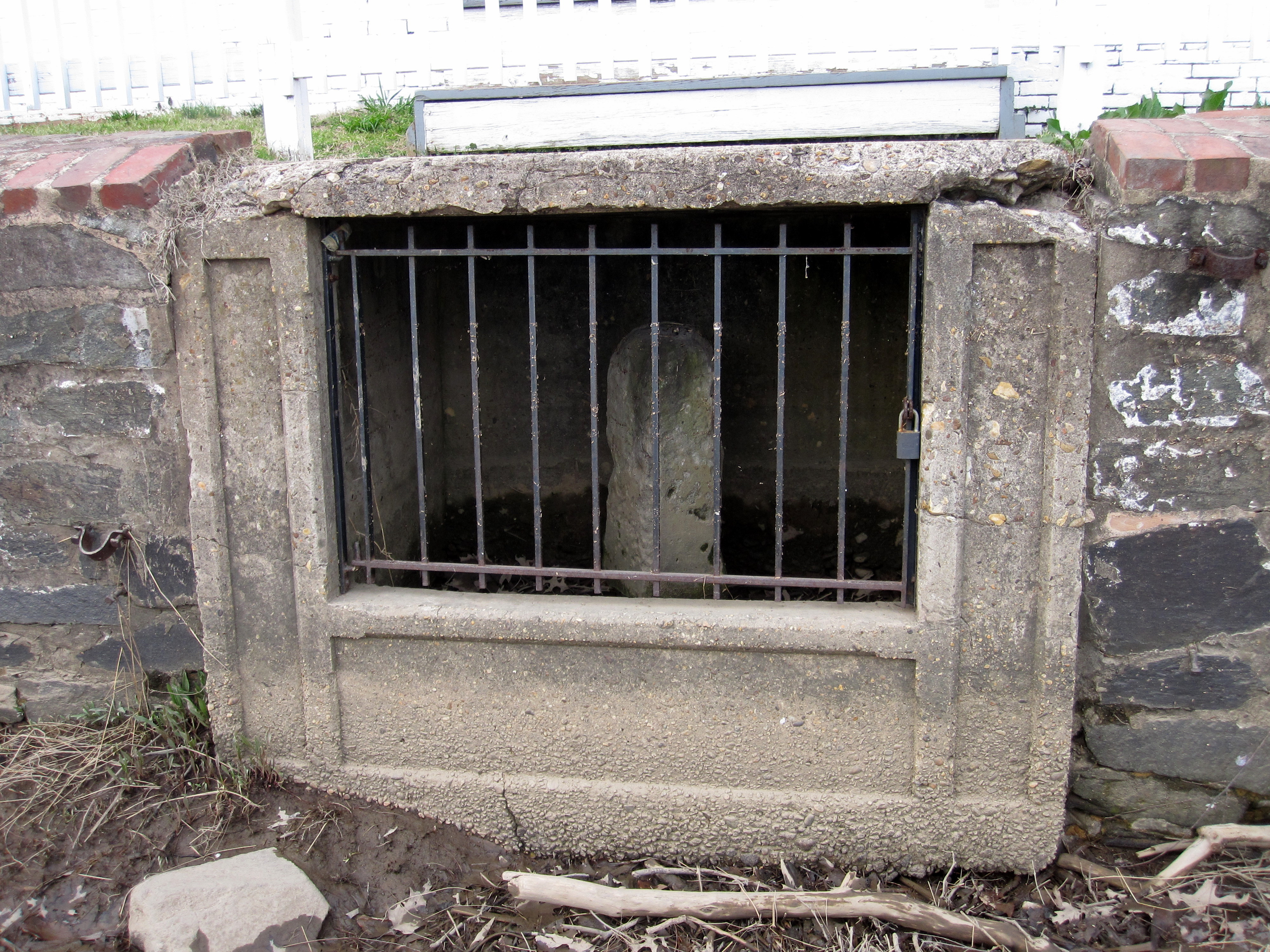
Boundary marker of the District of Columbia at Jones Point

As the United States began planning for the creation of a new federal capital city, Virginia passed an act on December 3, 1789 that approved the cession of up to 10 square miles of territory to the proposed capital. The Residence Act of 1790 authorized the creation of a federal capital along the Potomac River, with its exact borders to be determined by George Washington. Washington insisted upon Alexandria's inclusion in the new city, which was approved in an amendment to the act in 1791, though the amendment also stipulated that the federal government be based in the territory ceded by Maryland. Oliver Wolcott Jr. stated that Washington privately favored Alexandria as the seat of government, but did not press the matter due to concerns that his personal ties to the town would create the appearance of impropriety. The first and southernmost boundary marker of the capital was erected at Alexandria's Jones Point on April 15, 1791. Ahead of Alexandria's expected cession, the Fairfax County Court moved to Fairfax City in April 1800.

The District of Columbia was organized under the District of Columbia Organic Act of 1801, formally splitting Alexandria from Virginia and placing it within the new Alexandria County alongside the remainder of Virginia's cession. With their inclusion in the new capital, Alexandrians lost Virginia state citizenship as well as the right to vote in federal elections. Alexandria continued to operate under Virginia law until 1804, when Congress granted a new charter for the town that abolished the positions of recorder and alderman, expanded the common council to 16 members, and divided the town into four wards.

In 1814, during the War of 1812, the British military carried out a successful raid on Alexandria, which surrendered without a fight. In order to avoid the town's destruction, twenty-two merchant ships and large quantities of flour, tobacco, cotton, wine, and sugar were handed over by Alexandria's municipal authorities to the British.

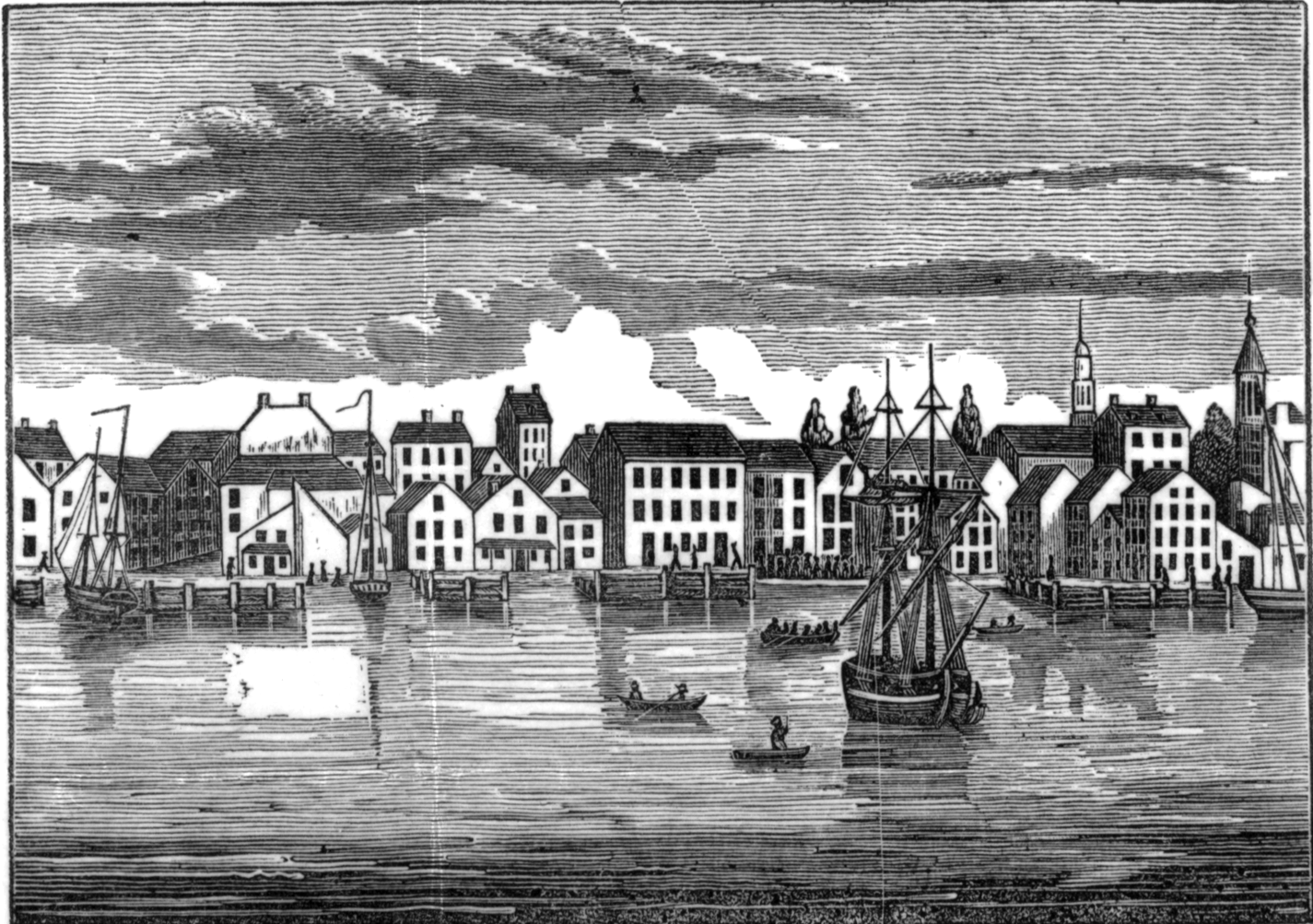
Alexandria was a prosperous trading port throughout the 19th century. This 1836 engraving shows a slave ship taking on slaves on the city's Potomac waterfront as part of the coastwise slave trade.

Alexandria's economy stagnated with a decline in Northern Virginia's agricultural output, and the slave trade became increasingly important as Alexandria sought to supply the cotton industry of the Deep South. Even as "observers perceived the downward trend of Alexandria's relative economic power", Alexandria grew to become the country's largest center of slave trading by the 1830s. From 1828 to 1836, Alexandria was home to the Franklin & Armfield Slave Market, one of the largest slave trading companies in the United States. By the 1830s, they were sending more than 1,000 slaves annually from Alexandria to their Natchez, Mississippi, New Orleans, and later Texas markets to help meet the demand for slaves in Mississippi and nearby states.

As discontent with the District of Columbia grew south of the Potomac, a movement emerged that called for Alexandria County to be retroceded to Virginia. Amidst economic troubles, many in Alexandria felt neglected by Congress, which Alexandrians had no say in due to the disenfranchisement of District residents. As the Chesapeake & Ohio (C&O) Canal spurred development on the north side of the Potomac, Alexandria invested heavily into its own canal to provide a direct connection to the C&O Canal's terminus at Georgetown, which failed to provide the desired economic benefits despite the steep cost. Meanwhile, Georgetown's port emerged as a major rival to Alexandria's. Alexandria was also ineligible to host federal buildings under the 1791 amendment to the Residence Act. Further, proposals to abolish the slave trade in the District would have devastated one of Alexandria's major industries. Pro-slavery factions in Virginia likewise wanted the land to be returned to provide the state legislature with an additional two members that would likely favor slavery.

On July 9, 1846, Congress agreed to hold a referendum in Alexandria County on the issue of retrocession. On September 1 and 2, 763 voted in favor of retrocession while 222 opposed it. President James K. Polk accepted the results on September 7, and Virginia formally assumed control over the land on March 13, 1847. Alexandria was re-chartered as a city in 1852.

=== Late 19th century ===
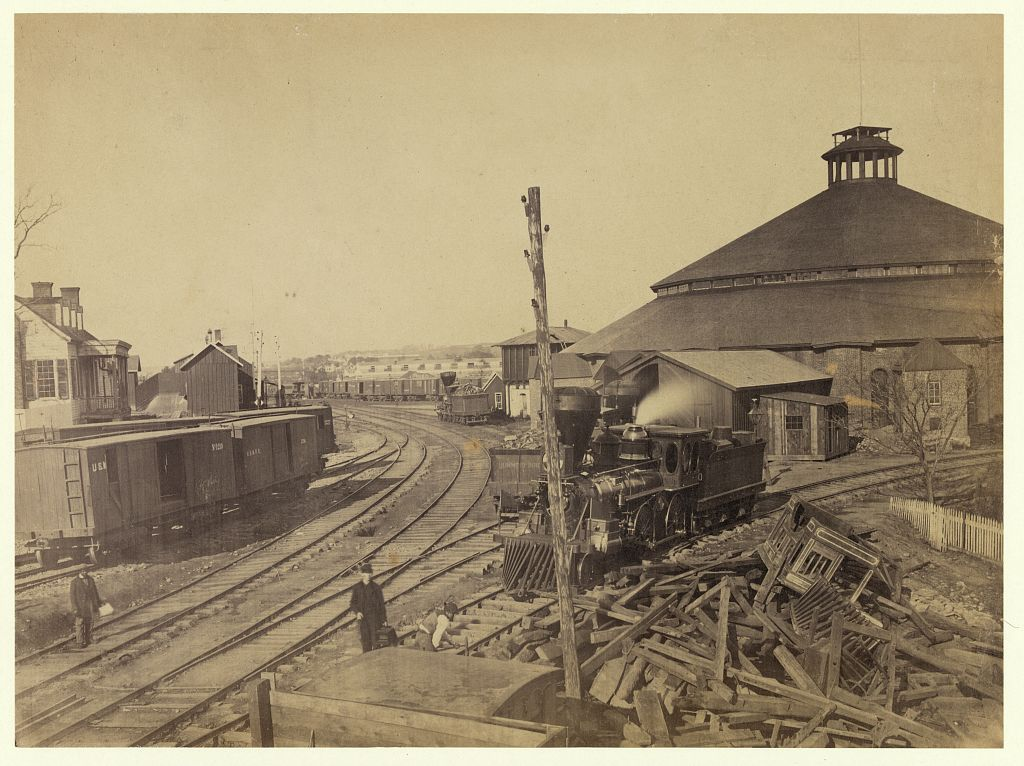
The depot of the Orange and Alexandria Railroad

Alexandria's port, the ninth-largest in the nation in 1847, remained a valuable asset, but the town sought to diversify its economy with an industrialization effort after leaving the District. Despite its financial burdens, the Alexandria Canal helped provide coal and raw materials that were useful for the development of industry. Having returned to Virginia, Alexandria was also no longer subject to the financial regulations that Congress imposed upon the District. Alexandria soon became a significant railway hub, beginning with the founding of the Orange and Alexandria Railroad in 1848 and continuing with the Manassas Gap Railroad in 1850 and the Alexandria, Loudoun, & Hampshire Railroad in 1854. The manufacturing industry expanded as numerous machine shops and foundries were established, and by 1850, Alexandria's richest man was a manufacturer rather than a merchant. Alexandria's Whig leadership, which had dominated local politics since the 1830s, also made significant investments in public works during this period, greatly improving its infrastructure.

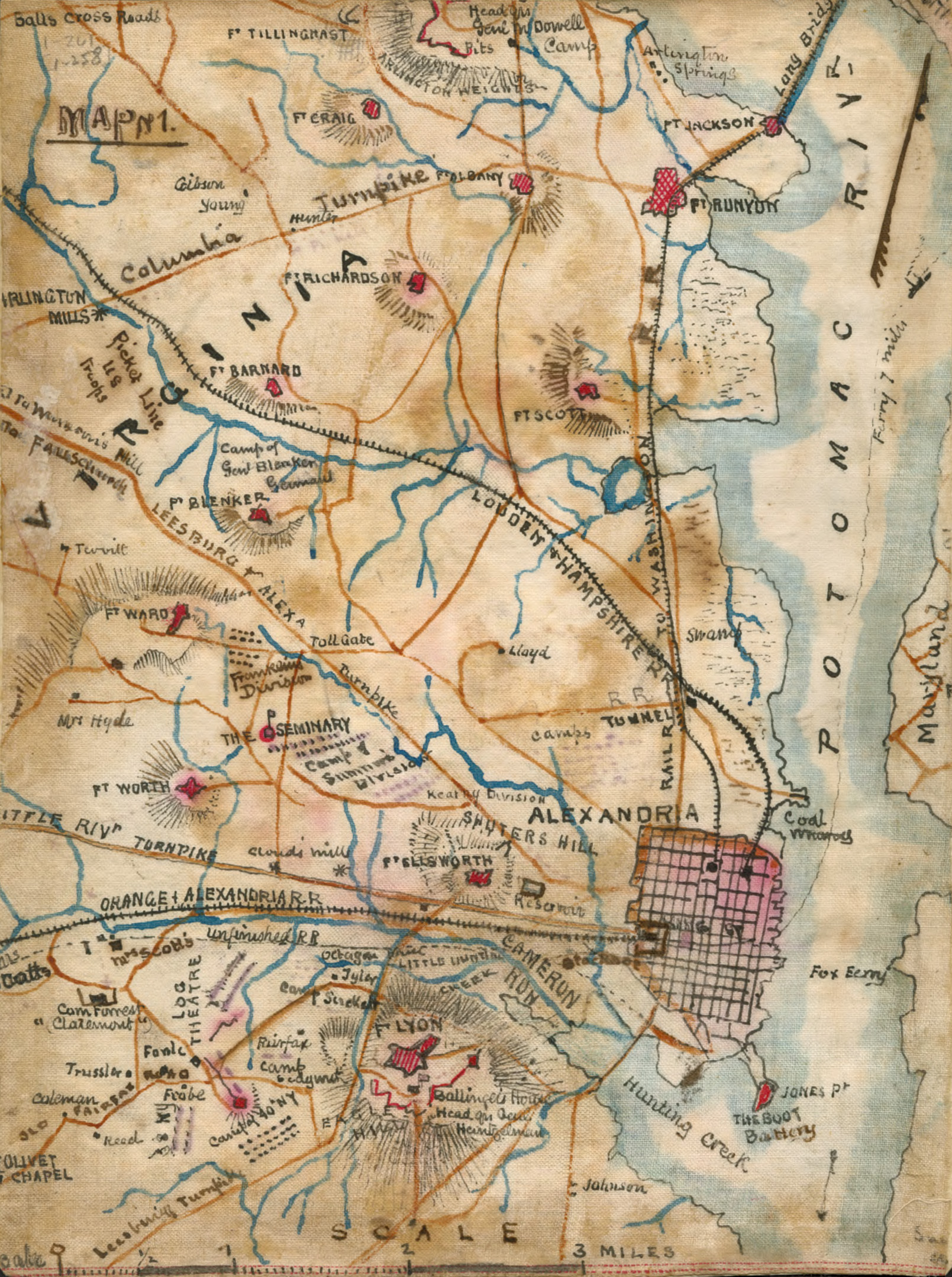
Map of Alexandria showing the forts that were constructed to defend Washington during the American Civil War

In the 1860 presidential election, Alexandria supported Constitutional Union Party candidate John Bell. As talk of secession grew in early 1861, Alexandria continued to support the Union, sending Unionist George William Brent as its representative to a Virginia convention on secession in February. After the Civil War began in earnest with the Battle of Fort Sumter, Alexandria rapidly came to oppose remaining in the Union. On May 23, 958 Alexandrians voted to approve Virginia's secession, while 106 voted against. The following day, Union troops landed at the base of Cameron Street, hoping to secure the city's rail network and port. Shortly after landing, Colonel Elmer E. Ellsworth of the New York Fire Zouaves removed a large Confederate flag from the roof of the Marshall House, for which he was shot and killed by proprietor James W. Jackson. One of Ellsworth's soldiers, Francis E. Brownell, immediately killed Jackson. The deaths of Ellsworth and Jackson were widely publicized, and both men became martyrs for their respective sides.

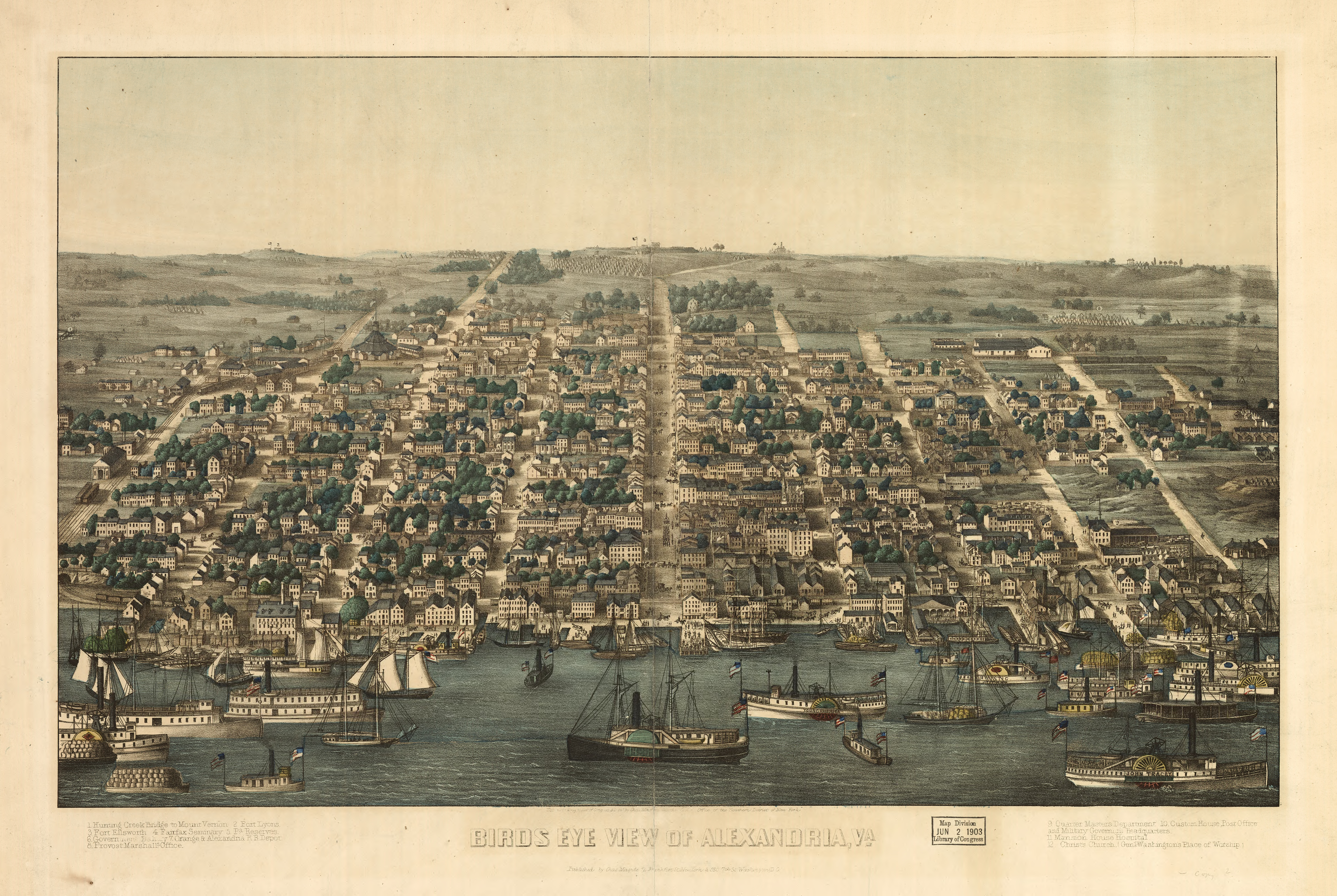
1863 aerial view of Alexandria from the Potomac River with Fort Ellsworth visible on the hill in the center background

Alexandria was the subject of the longest Union occupation of any settlement in the country during the Civil War, remaining under military control for the duration of the conflict. The city became a major logistical hub for the Army of the Potomac, with many buildings seized for supply depots and medical centers. Fort Ward, one of a ring of forts built by the Union army for the defense of Washington, D.C., is located inside the boundaries of present-day Alexandria. There were five military prisons in the city, the largest being the Washington Street Military Prison. The war caused a steep increase in the city's black population due to the arrival of thousands of escaped slaves, designated "contrabands" to avoid returning them to their masters. The Restored Government of Virginia, the Unionist rival to Virginia's secessionist government, was headquartered in Alexandria from August 1863 until May 1865 after its previous stronghold became the new state of West Virginia.

As Reconstruction began, Alexandria's population was roughly half black. With local Unionists and Republican carpetbaggers helping shape policy under military protection, these black residents experienced a brief period of enhanced rights. In 1869, Virginia was readmitted to the union with a new state constitution. Federal troops withdrew from the city on January 26, 1870, restoring civilian control. Alexandria subsequently became an independent city distinct from Alexandria County, as Virginia's new constitution stipulated that any city of at least 10,000 people would be independent. The city's black population, aligned with the local Republicans, gained the right to vote with the passage of the Fifteenth Amendment. The Conservative Party emerged as a serious rival to the Republicans, and the Conservative candidate won a narrow victory in the first post-war mayoral race on May 26, 1870. Nonetheless, that election also saw the first black man elected to city council, and a Republican was elected mayor in 1872. By the mid-1870s, however, the Democratic Party came to dominate city politics, pushing the Republicans and their African American supporters to the political fringe. The implementation of Jim Crow laws reversed many of the gains that black people had made after the war.

Alexandria's economy struggled throughout much of the late 19th century. The Civil War had burdened the city with large numbers of refugees and numerous ruined structures, including its port, but debt from pre-war investments into railroads and canals limited its ability to fund recovery efforts. 1873 saw a milestone for transportation in the city with the opening of its first horse-drawn streetcar in July, but the Panic of 1873 further harmed the city's economy. An 1881 essay in Scribner's Monthly described Alexandria as "dead commercially". The city's history of wooden shipbuilding came to an end around 1883 due to the expense of producing fittings elsewhere and delivering them to Alexandria. The Alexandria Canal brought in record amounts of coal, but its continuous failure to attain desired levels of profitability resulted in its permanent closure in 1887. Even as many East Coast cities experienced surges in immigration, Alexandria's population growth was negligible in the 1870s and 1880s, and the city had fallen far behind regional peers like Washington and Baltimore. The 1880s did see "modern conveniences" come to Alexandria, including telephone service in 1881 and electricity in 1889. The first electric streetcars arrived in Alexandria in 1892, fueling the growth of suburbs to the north and west of the city.

In the waning years of the 19th century, Alexandria suffered its two documented lynchings. The first, in 1897, was Joseph H. McCoy and the second, in 1899, was Benjamin Thomas. Both were Black male teenagers accused, but never convicted, of assaulting young white girls that were known to them. They were both kidnapped from jail and hanged by mobs.

=== 20th century ===
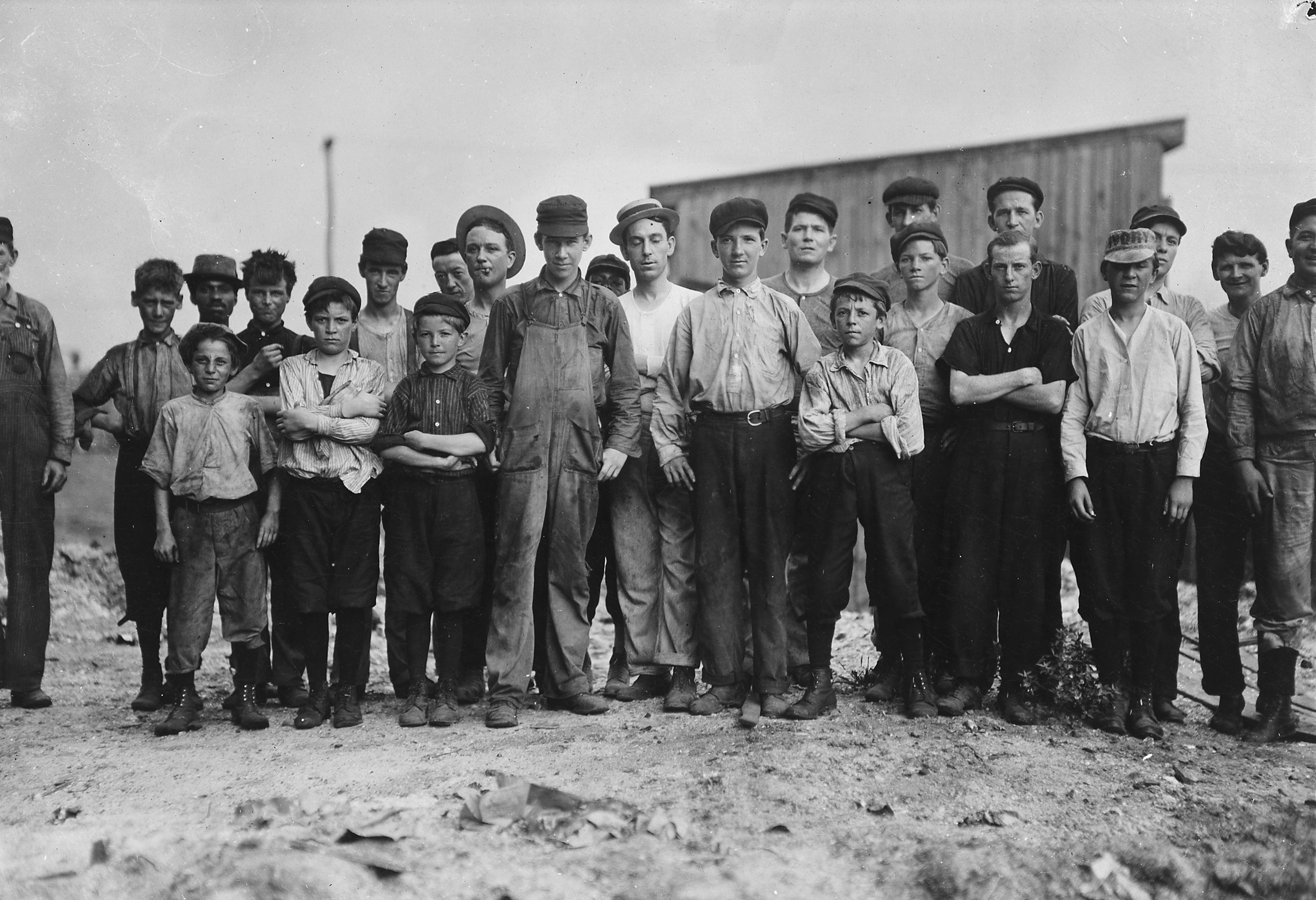
Child laborers working at a glass factory in Alexandria in 1911

The early 1900s were a prosperous time for Alexandria's manufacturing industry, with Lynchburg being the only city in Virginia to experience a greater increase in production. Glass was among the city's most important products, with the Virginia Glass Company, the Alexandria Glass Company, Old Dominion Glass Company, and the Belle Pre Bottle Company emerging as prominent businesses in this sector. Other key products included fertilizer, beer, and leather. Most businesses were relatively small, with the business occupying the first floor of a building and the owner and family living above.

In 1915, Alexandria annexed territory west of the city from Fairfax and Alexandria Counties, including the neighborhoods of Rosemont, Eisenhower East and Carlyle, and Shuter's Hill. Alexandria Union Station, established in 1905 to consolidate the city's passenger rail stations, was within the annexed land. Shuter's Hill soon hosted the George Washington National Masonic Memorial, which opened in 1932.

America's need for vessels in World War I led to the establishment of the Virginia Shipbuilding Corporation in 1918, a massive shipyard at Jones Point. President Woodrow Wilson visited the shipyard on May 30, 1918 to drive the first rivet into the yard's first keel to be laid down, the SS Gunston Hall. While the yard was expected to employ thousands of men for the construction of a dozen ships, the war ended before any could be deployed. The shipyard was largely abandoned in the early 1920s after legal investigations were launched into its owner, businessman and fraudster Charles W. Morse.

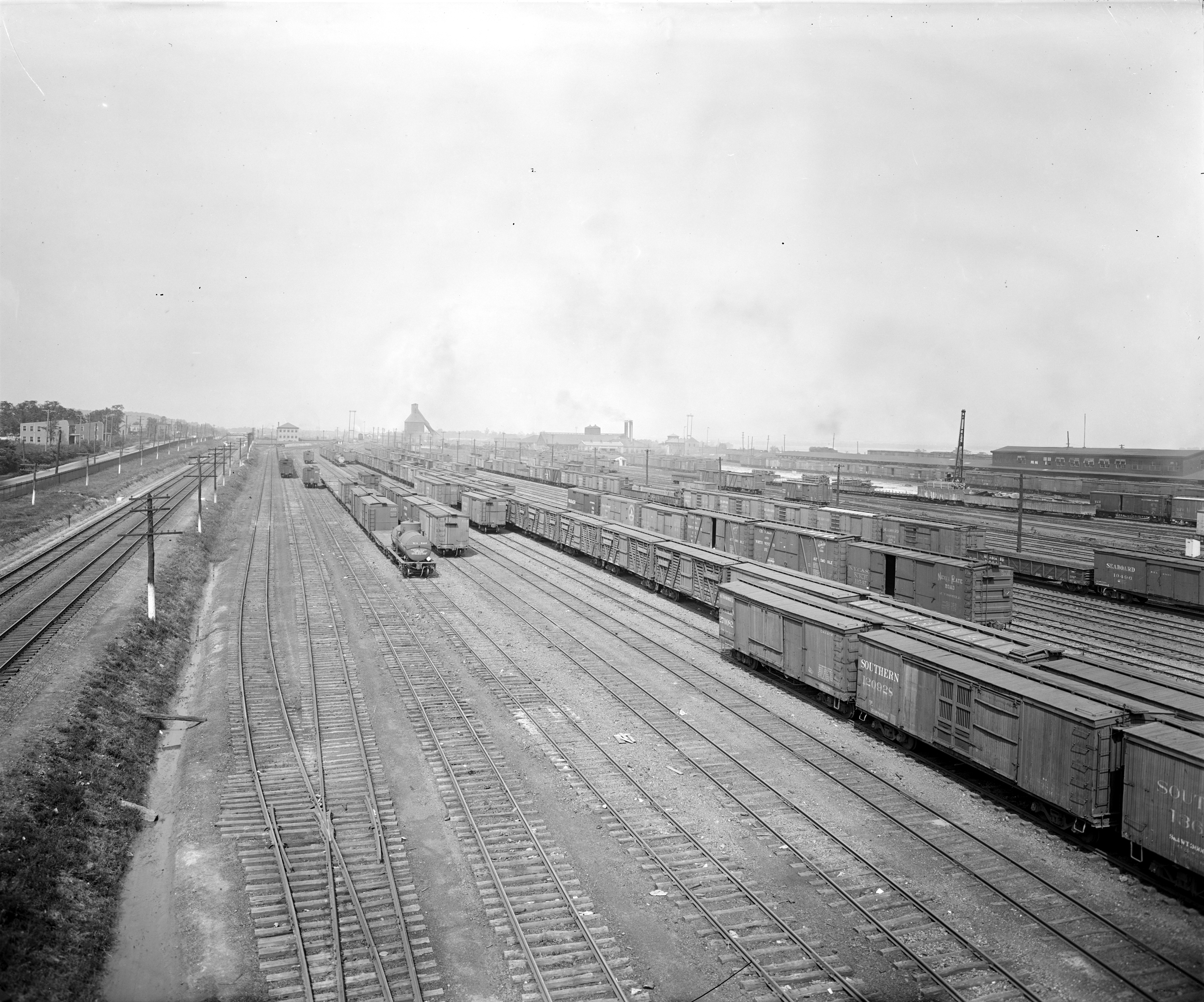
Potomac Yard, c. 1917

In 1930, Alexandria doubled in size by again annexing portions of Fairfax and Alexandria Counties, the latter of which had changed its name to Arlington County in 1920. The annexed land was bounded by the Little River Turnpike/Duke Street to the south, Quaker Lane to the west, and Four Mile Run to the north. This included the incorporated town of Potomac within Arlington County, a streetcar suburb that was formed in 1908 from the residential neighborhoods of Del Ray and St. Elmo. These areas housed many workers of Potomac Yard, one of the largest rail yards on the East Coast.

On August 28, 1939, African-American lawyer and Alexandria native Samuel Wilbert Tucker organized a sit-in at the city's library to protest its policy of racial segregation. This was among the first sit-in protests against segregation in the United States, establishing what would become a key tactic of the civil rights movement. The Robert Robinson Library, intended for the city's black population, opened the following year. The new library was converted into the Alexandria Black History Museum after desegregation.

Urban renewal in Alexandria began in 1939 as the city sought to carry out the slum clearance provisions of the Housing Act of 1937. As part of this policy, multiple black or mixed-race neighborhoods were demolished and replaced with segregated public housing developments. In 1946, part of Alexandria's "Old Town" core was designated the Alexandria Historic District, the third historic district in the United States. Many buildings in this district were demolished in the 1960s as part of the urban renewal effort, leading to the emergence of a strong historic preservation movement that called for the protection of the city's old structures. Alexandria's final urban renewal project was completed in 1984.

The New Deal and World War II brought large numbers of new residents to Alexandria as the federal government expanded. After the war, the city's old maritime and industrial economy faltered as the rise of large container ships rendered small river ports obsolete. As Alexandria's manufacturing base largely died out, the city sought to replace it with tourism, redeveloping its previously industrial waterfront into a recreational hub. Though Alexandria did attract some corporate offices, the city largely became a residential community for government employees.

In October 1950, Alexandria filed a lawsuit to annex 7.65 square miles of Fairfax County, stating that the city needed room to expand and would be better equipped to provide utilities for the land's residents than the county. The suit was approved by the Supreme Court of Virginia on December 3, 1951. When the annexation took effect on January 1, 1952, Alexandria's land area again roughly doubled. The annexed territory was the site of the Virginia Theological Seminary, established in 1823 by William Holland Wilmer, Francis Scott Key, and other prominent Episcopalians. The land was "sparsely populated", however, hosting only 11,000 residents. The annexation was swiftly followed by the massive development of both single-family homes as well as large apartment buildings. The post-annexation development brought many new streets to the area, and the city passed an ordinance in 1953 that stipulated that new north-south streets should be named for Confederate military officers.

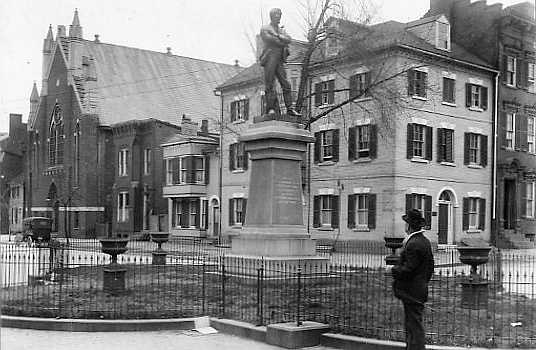
Appomattox, a Confederate memorial on Washington Street, c. 1920

For much of the 20th century, Alexandria was politically dominated by conservative, segregationist Southern Democrats. By the time of the civil rights era, Alexandria's ruling Democrats were aligned with the staunchly white supremacist U.S. Senator Harry F. Byrd and his political machine, which championed "massive resistance" to desegregation. T.C. Williams, superintendent of Alexandria Public Schools for thirty years, consistently opposed school integration, and Alexandria threatened to shut down its school system entirely in 1956 under the massive resistance campaign.

After Brown v. Board of Education, Alexandria reluctantly accepted 14 black students into previously all-white schools on February 10, 1959. Williams continued to resist integration until his retirement in 1963, while his successor John Albohm "cautiously" continued the integration process. Alexandria's city council voted to desegregate all public facilities in May 1963. In the fall of 1965, the city assigned students to local neighborhood schools regardless of race. In 1971, Alexandria enacted a "K-6, 2, 2, 2 plan" in an attempt to racially "balance" the student population throughout the city's public schools to better reflect its racial makeup. Students were assigned to schools in grade-based groups, beginning with kindergarten through sixth grade, then seventh and eighth, then freshman and sophomore classes, and finally junior and senior classes. That same year, Herman Boone joined T.C. Williams High School, which all junior and senior students had been reassigned to, and lead the football team to a 13–0 season, a state championship, and a national championship runner-up, which was the basis for the 2000 film Remember the Titans. School integration triggered significant white flight, which intensified after the federal government ordered Alexandria to finalize its integration of elementary schools in 1973.

As many conservatives left the city in response to desegregation in the 1960s and 1970s, they were replaced by more liberal-minded young professionals and retirees. Conservative Democratic influence in Alexandria collapsed in 1971, paving the way for a city government that included more progressive Democrats as well as moderate Republicans. In 1973, Nora Lamborne and Beverly Beidler became the first women elected to city council. By 1982, Alexandria had more elected Republicans than any other city in the state. In 1991, Patricia Ticer became the first woman to be elected mayor.

On December 28, 1961, the original Woodrow Wilson Bridge opened as part of the Capital Beltway, connecting Alexandria with Oxon Hill, Maryland. On July 1, 1969, Alexandria agreed to have the proposed Washington Metro expand into the city. After extensive delays, the King Street, Braddock Road, and Eisenhower Avenue stations opened as Metro's first three stations in Alexandria on December 17, 1983. To reduce its reliance on the Metrobus network, Alexandria opened its own bus transit system, DASH, on March 12, 1984. Metro's Van Dorn Street station opened in 1991.

Changes in railroad technology reduced the utility of Potomac Yard as a rail hub. Alexandria 20/20, a joint venture between the Richmond, Fredericksburg and Potomac Railroad and CSX, announced in September 1988 that it would be pursuing plans to redevelop the railyard into a mixed-use community. The project, which was intended to be built over the course of 30 years, aimed to be the "largest ever development" in Alexandria's history. The site was an unsuccessful contender for a new Washington Redskins stadium in 1992. A strip mall opened in Potomac Yard in 1997, which was intended to only last for 20 years until the mixed-use housing and office development could materialize.

=== 21st century ===
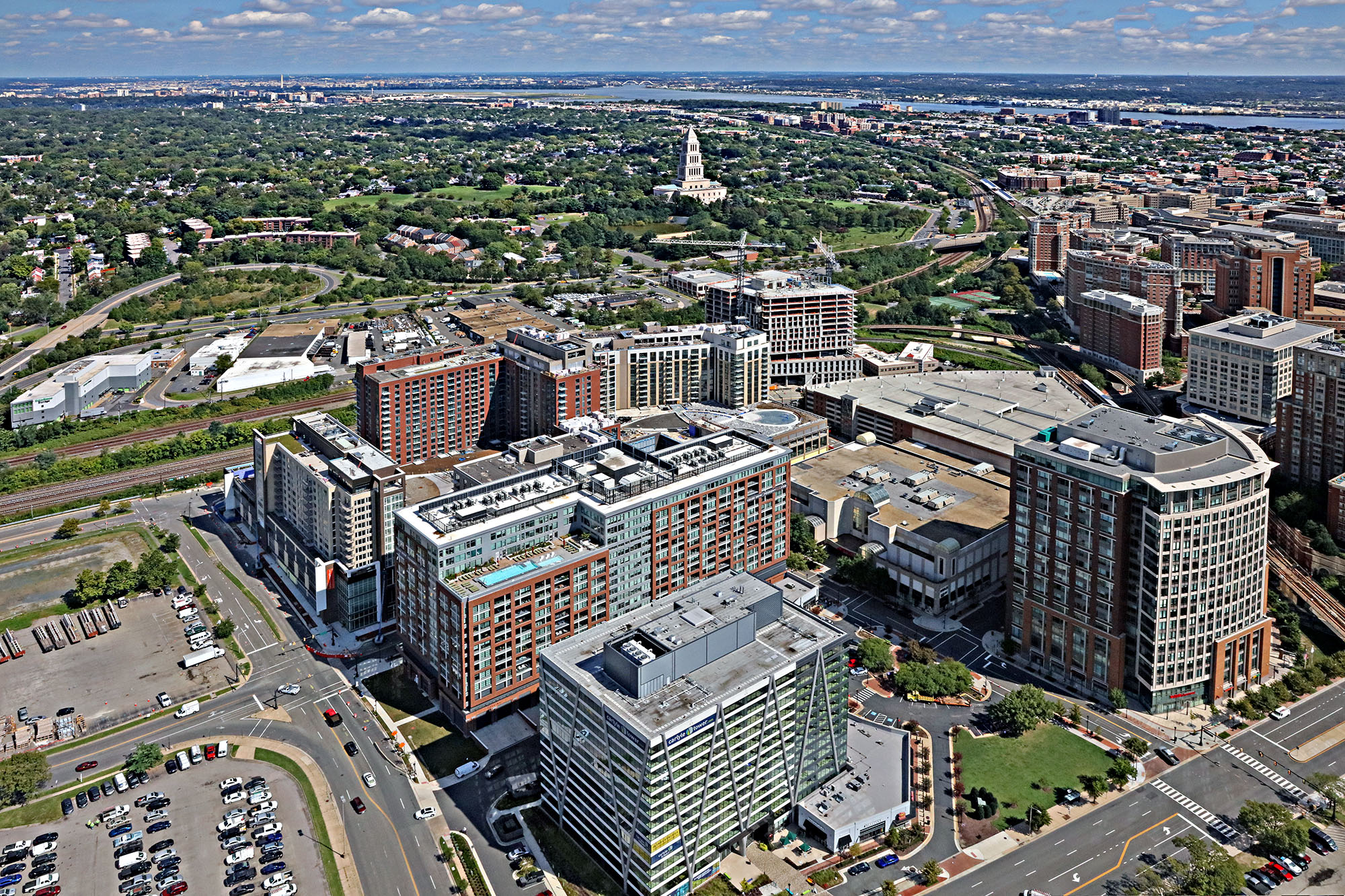
Hoffman Town Center in Alexandria in September 2021

The city repealed its policy of naming new north-south streets for Confederate officers in 2014. In 2019, the name of U.S. Route 1 in Alexandria was changed from Jefferson Davis Highway to Richmond Highway. Amidst the George Floyd protests, support grew for renaming Alexandria's T. C. Williams High School and Matthew Maury Elementary School, which were named for a segregationist school superintendent and a Confederate pro-slavery activist, respectively. The school board unanimously voted to rename both schools in November 2020, with the high school becoming Alexandria City High School and Maury Elementary becoming Naomi L. Brooks Elementary School on July 1, 2021. In 2023, Mayor Justin Wilson proposed renaming streets named for Confederates, beginning a phased process by which three to five streets would be renamed per phase.

In May 2023, a Metro station opened at Potomac Yard, roughly 30 years after such a station was first proposed for the redeveloped community. By that time, some housing had been built in addition to the existing retail, but the neighborhood was "clearly still under development", with full development not expected for several years or decades. In December of that year, Virginia Governor Glenn Youngkin and Monumental Sports & Entertainment founder Ted Leonsis announced plans to develop a 70-acre area in Potomac Yard that would have featured a new arena for the Washington Capitals and Washington Wizards. The proposal failed in March 2024 after it did not advance in the Virginia General Assembly, with Monumental instead keeping its teams in Washington, D.C. An "Innovation Campus" for Virginia Tech opened at Potomac Yard in January 2025.

== Geography ==
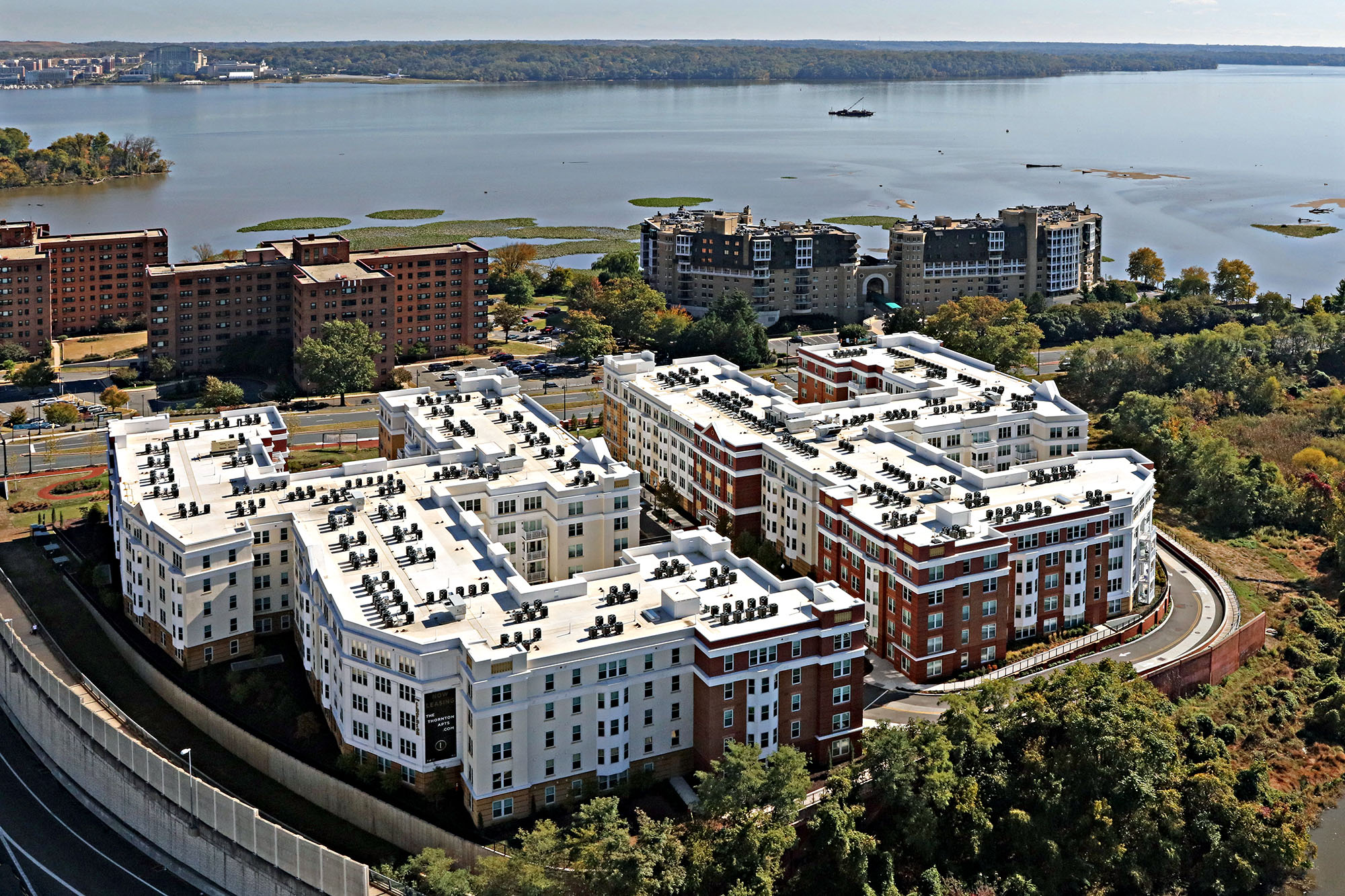
The Thornton in Alexandria in October 2019

According to the U.S. Census Bureau, the city has a total area of 15.5 square miles (40.1 km^{2}), of which 15.0 square miles (38.9 km^{2}) is land and 0.42 square miles (1.1 km^{2}), or 2.85%, is water. Alexandria is bounded on the east by the Potomac River (which forms the boundary between the city and Washington, D.C. and Prince George's County, Maryland), on the north and northwest by Arlington County, and on the south by Fairfax County. The western portions of the city were annexed from those two entities beginning in the 1930s.

The addressing system in Alexandria is not uniform and reflects the consolidation of several originally separate communities into a single city. In Old Town Alexandria, building numbers are assigned north and south from King Street and west (only) from the Potomac River. In the areas formerly in the town of Potomac, such as Del Ray and St. Elmo, building numbers are assigned east and west from Commonwealth Avenue and north (only) from King Street. In the western parts of the city, building numbers are assigned north and south from Duke Street.

The ZIP Code prefix 223 uniquely identifies the Alexandria postal area. However, the Alexandria postal area extends into Fairfax County and includes addresses outside of the city. Delivery areas have ZIP Codes 22301, 22302, 22303, 22304, 22305, 22306, 22307, 22308, 22309, 22310, 22311, 22312, 22314, and 22315, with other ZIP Codes in use for post office boxes and large mailers (22313, 22331, 22332, 22333).

Part of the George Washington Memorial Parkway is the one national protected area within the borders of Alexandria.

=== Neighborhoods and planning areas ===
As of 2024, the City of Alexandria is divided into 19 "Small Area Plans" and 11 additional overlapping plans. These areas and their component neighborhoods include:

Planning area (Small Area Plans)	Neighborhoods/ Subdivisions	Landmarks	Parks/ Cemeteries
Central Alexandria: Old Town; Old Town North; Hunting Creek; King Street retail; Northeast; Southwest Quadrant; Waterfront	Old Town; The Berg		Old Town: Founders; Point Lumley; Waterfront; Windmill Hill; Old Town North: Montgomery; Oronoco Bay; Rivergate; Tidelock; Hunting Creek area: Jones Point
Alexandria West	Dowden Terrace; The Hamlets; Lincolnia; Park Center; Southern Towers		Holmes Run Park
Arlandia–Chirilagua	Arlandria		
Beauregard	Adams; Garden District; Greenway; Seminary Overlook; Southern Towers; Upland Park		Dora Kelley Nature Park; Winkler Botanical Reserve
Braddock Road Metro Station Area	Braddock area; Braddock Place; Colecroft; Henry Street Corridor; Parker–Gray; Uptown–Parker–Gray Historic District		
Eisenhower East and Carlyle; Eisenhower West; King Street Metro/ Eisenhower; Seminary Hill/ Strawberry Hill (part)	Eisenhower Valley: Eisenhower West; Eisenhower East; Carlyle		
Fairlington/Bradlee			
Van Dorn	Bounded by: Shirley Hwy.; Cameron Run; Holmes Run; city limits	Cameron Station; Landmark Shopping Center; West End	
North Ridge/ Rosemont	Beverley Hills; Braddock Heights; North Ridge; Historic districts: Parkfairfax; Rosemont		Ivy Hill Cemetery
Potomac West; Mount Vernon Ave. Business Area	Del Ray; Potomac; Temple Park		
Potomac Yard/ Potomac Green; North Potomac Yard	Potomac Yard		
Seminary Hill/ Strawberry Hill	Bradless; Eisenhower Valley (part); Holmes Run, Brookville, Foxchase; Seminary Hill; Seminary Valley; Strawberry Hill	Virginia Theological Seminary	
Taylor Run/ Duke Street	Clover-College Park; Taylor Run		

Many areas outside the city have an Alexandria mailing address yet are a part of Fairfax County including: Hollin Hills, Franconia, Groveton, Hybla Valley, Huntington, Lincolnia, Belle Haven, Mount Vernon, Fort Hunt, Engleside, Burgundy Village, Waynewood, Wilton Woods, Rose Hill, Virginia Hills, Hayfield, and Kingstowne. Some refer to these areas as Lower Alexandria, South Alexandria, or Alexandria, Fairfax County.

=== Climate ===
The climate in this area is characterized by hot, humid summers and generally mild to cool winters. According to the Köppen climate classification system, Alexandria has a humid subtropical climate, abbreviated "Cfa" on climate maps.

== Demographics ==
Historical population
Census	Pop.	Note	%±
1790	2,748		—
1800	4,971		80.9%
1810	7,227		45.4%
1820	8,218		13.7%
1830	8,241		0.3%
1840	8,459		2.6%
1850	8,734		3.3%
1860	12,652		44.9%
1870	13,570		7.3%
1880	13,659		0.7%
1890	14,339		5.0%
1900	14,528		1.3%
1910	15,329		5.5%
1920	18,060		17.8%
1930	24,149		33.7%
1940	33,523		38.8%
1950	61,787		84.3%
1960	91,023		47.3%
1970	110,927		21.9%
1980	103,217		−7.0%
1990	111,183		7.7%
2000	128,283		15.4%
2010	139,966		9.1%
2020	159,467		13.9%
2025 (est.)	160,662	▲	0.7%
U.S. Decennial Census; 1790–1960 1900–1990; 1990–2000; 2010-2020 2010 2020

=== Racial and ethnic composition ===
Alexandria city, Virginia – Racial and ethnic composition Note: the US Census treats Hispanic/Latino as an ethnic category. This table excludes Latinos from the racial categories and assigns them to a separate category. Hispanics/Latinos may be of any race.
Race / Ethnicity (NH = Non-Hispanic)	Pop 1980	Pop 1990	Pop 2000	Pop 2010	Pop 2020	% 1980	% 1990	% 2000	% 2010	% 2020
White alone (NH)	72,061	71,486	68,889	74,878	78,519	69.82%	64.30%	53.70%	53.50%	49.24%
Black or African American alone (NH)	22,764	23,957	28,463	29,778	31,314	22.05%	21.55%	22.19%	21.28%	19.64%
Native American or Alaska Native alone (NH)	269	299	255	327	217	0.26%	0.27%	0.20%	0.23%	0.14%
Asian alone (NH)	2,888	4,503	7,199	8,351	11,205	2.80%	4.05%	5.61%	5.97%	7.03%
Native Hawaiian or Pacific Islander alone (NH)	x	x	100	109	77	x	x	0.08%	0.08%	0.05%
Other race alone (NH)	1,193	160	506	485	1,026	1.16%	0.14%	0.39%	0.35%	0.64%
Mixed race or Multiracial (NH)	x	x	3,989	3,514	7,737	x	x	3.11%	2.51%	4.85%
Hispanic or Latino (any race)	4,042	10,778	18,882	22,524	29,372	3.92%	9.69%	14.72%	16.09%	18.42%
Total	103,217	111,183	128,283	139,966	159,467	100.00%	100.00%	100.00%	100.00%	100.00%

=== 2020 census ===
As of the 2020 census, Alexandria had a population of 159,467. The median age was 36.5 years. 18.5% of residents were under the age of 18 and 11.8% of residents were 65 years of age or older. For every 100 females there were 90.8 males, and for every 100 females age 18 and over there were 88.0 males age 18 and over.

100.0% of residents lived in urban areas, while 0.0% lived in rural areas.

There were 75,555 households in Alexandria, of which 22.7% had children under the age of 18 living in them. Of all households, 35.9% were married-couple households, 22.8% were households with a male householder and no spouse or partner present, and 34.4% were households with a female householder and no spouse or partner present. About 41.5% of all households were made up of individuals and 9.1% had someone living alone who was 65 years of age or older.

There were 80,479 housing units, of which 6.1% were vacant. The homeowner vacancy rate was 0.9% and the rental vacancy rate was 6.0%.

=== 2010 census ===
At the 2010 census, there were 139,966 people, 68,082 households and 30,978 families residing in the city. The population density was 8,452.0 inhabitants per square mile (3,263.3/km^{2}). There were 68,082 housing units at an average density of 4,233.2 per square mile (1,634.4/km^{2}). The racial/ethnic mix of the population was:

- 60.9% White
- 21.8% African American
- 6.0% Asian (1.3% Indian, 1.0% Filipino, 0.9% Chinese, 0.8% Korean, 0.5% Thai, 0.3% Vietnamese, 0.2% Japanese, 1.0% Other)
- 0.4% Native American
- 0.1% Pacific Islander
- 3.7% from two or more races
- 16.1% of the population were Hispanics or Latinos of any national origin (4.6% Salvadoran, 1.7% Mexican, 1.6% Honduran, 1.1% Guatemalan, 1.1% Puerto Rican, 0.9% Bolivian, 0.8% Peruvian, 0.4% Colombian)

=== 2000 census ===
In 2000, there were 61,889 households, of which 18.6% had children under the age of 18 living with them, 32.2% were married couples living together, 9.2% had a female householder with no husband present, and 55.2% were non-families. 43.4% of all households were made up of individuals, and 6.8% had someone living alone who was 65 years of age or older. The average household size was 2.04 and the average family size was 2.87.

The age distribution was 16.8% under the age of 18, 9.2% from 18 to 24, 43.5% from 25 to 44, 21.5% from 45 to 64, and 9.0% who were 65 years of age or older. The median age was 34 years. For every 100 females, there were 93.5 males. For every 100 females aged 18 and over, there were 91.7 males.

=== American Community Survey ===
According to 2024 American Community Survey 1-Year Estimates, the median household income was $124,593 and median family income was $178,036. Additionally, 5.9% of the population of the population were below the poverty line. 5.6% of those under the age of 18 and 8.6% of those 65 and older were living below the poverty line. 69.4% of Alexandria residents aged 25 and older have attained a bachelor's degree or higher, compared with 43.3% statewide.

== Economy ==
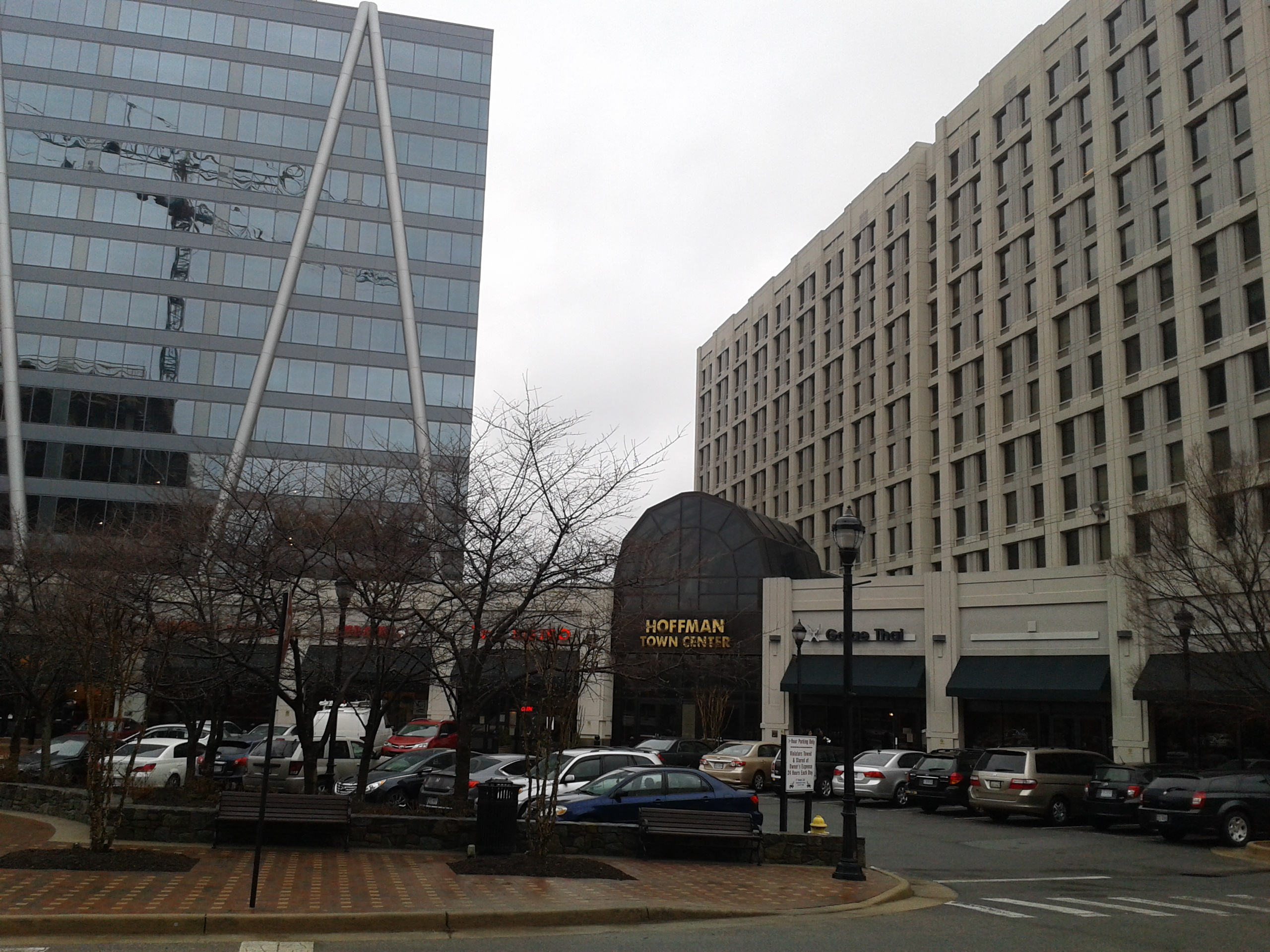
Hoffman Town Center, a mixed-use retail and office development in the Eisenhower Valley

Companies headquartered in Alexandria include Crooked Beat Records, Five Guys, the Institute for Defense Analyses (IDA), The Motley Fool, Oblon law firm, Pentagon Federal Credit Union (PenFed), Port City Brewing Company, Purple Strategies, ThinkFun, and VSE. Several federal agencies are based in Alexandria, including the National Credit Union Administration, United States Patent and Trademark Office, National Science Foundation, Department of Defense Office of Inspector General, and the Food and Nutrition Service. The Department of Defense Education Activity (DoDEA), the federal school system for military dependents, is headquartered in Alexandria.

Alexandria is home to many charities and non-profit organizations including the national headquarters of Catholic Charities, Citizens for the Republic, Global Impact, Good360, International Centre for Missing & Exploited Children, Islamic Relief USA, United Way, and Volunteers of America. Trade associations located in the city include the American Counseling Association, the Human Resource Certification Institute, the Society for Human Resource Management, the National Society of Professional Engineers, the National Beer Wholesalers Association, the American Society of Clinical Oncology, National Industries for the Blind, American Physical Therapy Association, the National Association of Convenience Stores, and the American International Automobile Dealers Association. Alexandria also has a Chamber of Commerce and other business associations including the West End Business Association, the Del Ray Business Association and the Old Town Business Association.

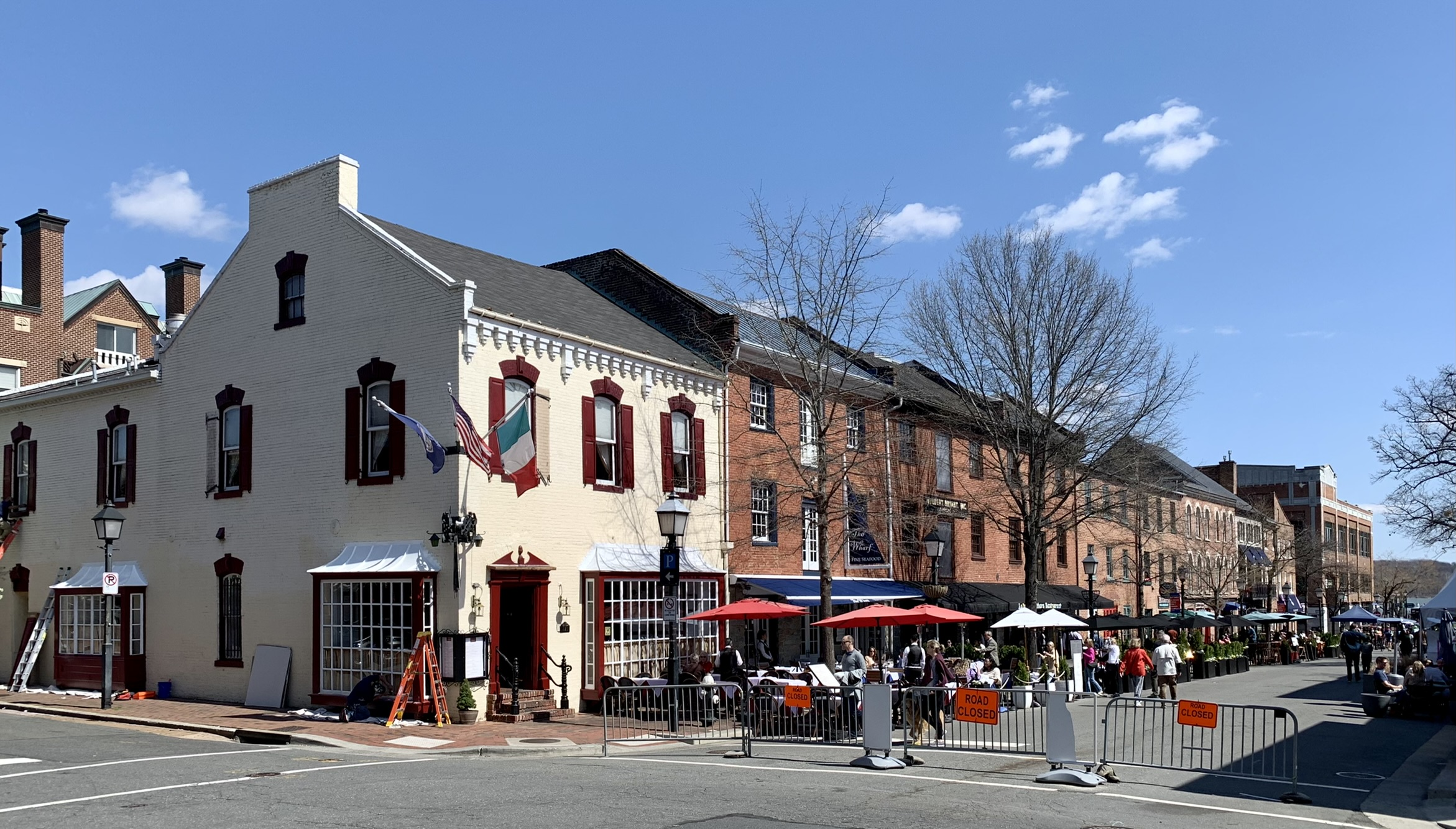
King Street is the primary commercial corridor through Old Town.

Major employment sectors in Alexandria include management consulting, business and finance, office and administrative support, computer and mathematical, sales, and legal. Jobs in Alexandria are highly concentrated around the city's Metrorail stations, primarily in Old Town North and the Braddock Road area, Old Town, and Carlyle near the Eisenhower Avenue station, as well as along the I-395 corridor on the west side of the city.

Tourism is a major sector in Alexandria, with revenue from visitors surpassing US$1,000,000,000 in 2024 for the first time in the city's history. In 2025, Visit Alexandria announced that it was developing the city's first-ever tourism master plan, which included efforts to attract visitors to neighborhoods outside of the traditional core of Old Town. Visit Alexandria stated that tourism supported over 5700 jobs in the city at the time.

13% of people that work in Alexandria live in the city, while 87% commute in, with 37% of those commuters being from Fairfax County. An additional 61,000 people commute out of Alexandria to work. 35% commute to Washington, D.C., and 29% commute to Fairfax County. As of March 2024, 2.0% of Alexandria residents are unemployed.

Top public employers
#	Employer	# of employees
1	United States Department of Defense - Mark Center	8,000
2	United States Patent and Trademark Office	6,000
3	City of Alexandria	2,600
4	Alexandria City Public Schools	2,500
5	United States Inspector General	2,400
6	United States Department of Commerce	2,000
7	National Science Foundation	1,800
8	Washington Metropolitan Area Transit Authority	1,500
9	United States Department of Agriculture	800
10	Northern Virginia Community College	600

Top private employers
#	Employer	# of employees
1	Inova Health System	2,500
2	Systems Planning & Analysis Inc	1,600
3	Institute for Defense Analyses	1,500
4	Goodwin House	1,000
5	Kearney & Company	700
6	Wegmans	600
6	National Center for Missing and Exploited Children	600
7	Harris Teeter	450
8	Woodbine Rehabilitation & Healthcare Center	300
9	Giant Food	200

== Culture ==
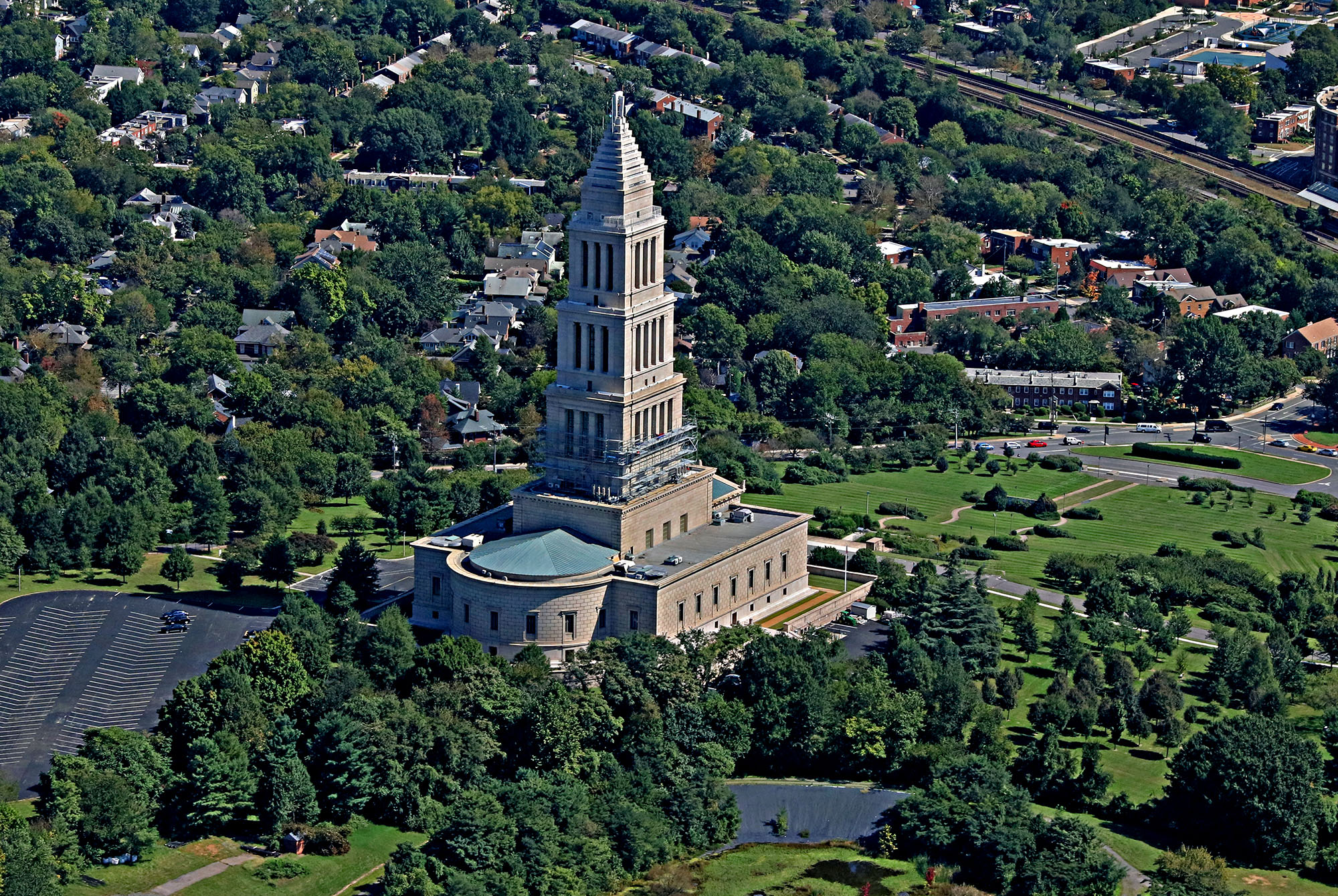
The George Washington Masonic National Memorial was built from 1922 to 1932.

=== Events ===
A popular Christmas time attraction in Alexandria is the Scottish Christmas Walk, which was established in 1969. The event, which involves a parade through the center of Old Town Alexandria, celebrates the city's Scottish heritage, and is the centerpiece of a yearly holiday festival. It serves as a fundraiser for social services in Alexandria. Other parades in Old Town celebrate Saint Patrick's Day and the birthday of George Washington. Other annual events include the Red Cross Waterfront Festival in June, the city's birthday celebration with fireworks show in July, various ethnic heritage days at Tavern Square, and "First Night Alexandria" on New Year's Eve.

These parades and other official events are typically led by Alexandria's town crier, who, often dressed in elaborately, by a tradition dating to the 18th century, in a red coat, breeches, black boots and a tricorne hat, welcomes participants.

=== Sites of Interest ===
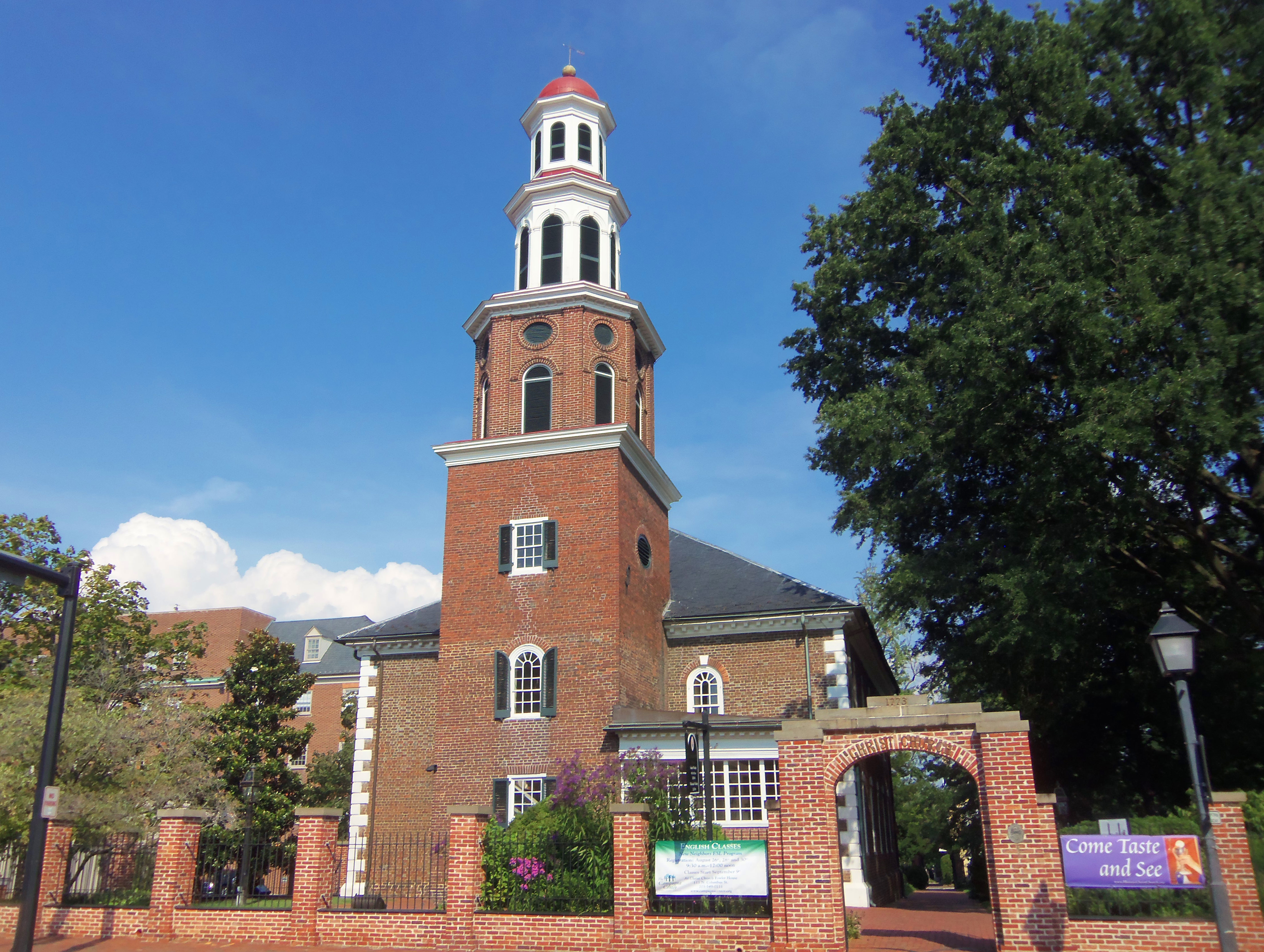
Christ Church, an historic church whose congregation has included George Washington and Robert E. Lee

Landmarks within the city include the George Washington Masonic National Memorial (also known as the Masonic Temple) and Observation Deck, Christ Church, Gadsby's Tavern, Stabler-Leadbeater Apothecary Shop, John Carlyle House, Lee-Fendall House, Robert E. Lee's boyhood home, and the Alexandria City Hall with the adjacent Market Square. Other sites of historical interest in the city include Fort Ward Park and Museum, Phoenix Mill, and the Alexandria Canal lock re-creation at Canal Office Center. The Alexandria Black History Museum, Alexandria Archaeology Museum, and the Lyceum display various aspects of the city's history.

The Torpedo Factory Art Center, located on the Old Town waterfront, is a former torpedo factory that now serves as an art center filled with independent art studios and exhibits. The Athenaeum is another center for the arts. Also located in Old Town is Little Theatre of Alexandria, a community theatre at 600 Wolfe Street. South of Old Town on the Potomac River is the Jones Point Light and the nearby south cornerstone of the original District of Columbia. Immediately west of Old Town is the United States Patent and Trademark Office which includes the National Inventors Hall of Fame Museum. The Birchmere is a concert hall that features musical acts as well as ethnic and comedic performers. Site of interests with Alexandria addresses but located outside of the city include River Farm, Collingwood Library & Museum, Green Spring Gardens Park, Huntley Meadows Park, Historic Huntley, Pope-Leighey House (designed by Frank Lloyd Wright), Woodlawn Plantation, and George Washington's Grist Mill and Mount Vernon Estate.

In 1830, John Hollensbury's home in Alexandria was one of two homes directly bordering an alleyway that received a large amount of horse-drawn wagon traffic and loiterers. In order to prevent people from using the alleyway, Hollensbury constructed a 7 feet (2.1 m) wide, 25 feet (7.6 m) deep, 325-square-foot (30.2 m^{2}), two-story home using the existing brick walls of the adjacent homes for the sides of the new home. The brick walls of the Hollensbury Spite House living room have gouges from wagon-wheel hubs; the house is still standing, and is occupied.

The Oswald Durant Center in the Upper King Street neighborhood of the Old Town is named after Dr. Oswald Durant, one of the first African American doctors in Alexandria.

== Media ==
Alexandria has two local weekly newspapers: the Alexandria Gazette Packet and the Alexandria Times. The Alexandria Gazette was once published in the city from 1834 to 1974.

== Sports ==
The city is home to the Alexandria Aces of the Cal Ripken Sr. Collegiate Baseball League. The team's home field is Frank Mann Field. Alexandria had previously been home of one professional sports team, the Alexandria Dukes, a minor league baseball team which moved to Woodbridge in 1984 to become The Prince William Pirates (now known as the Fredericksburg Nationals).

== Parks and recreation ==
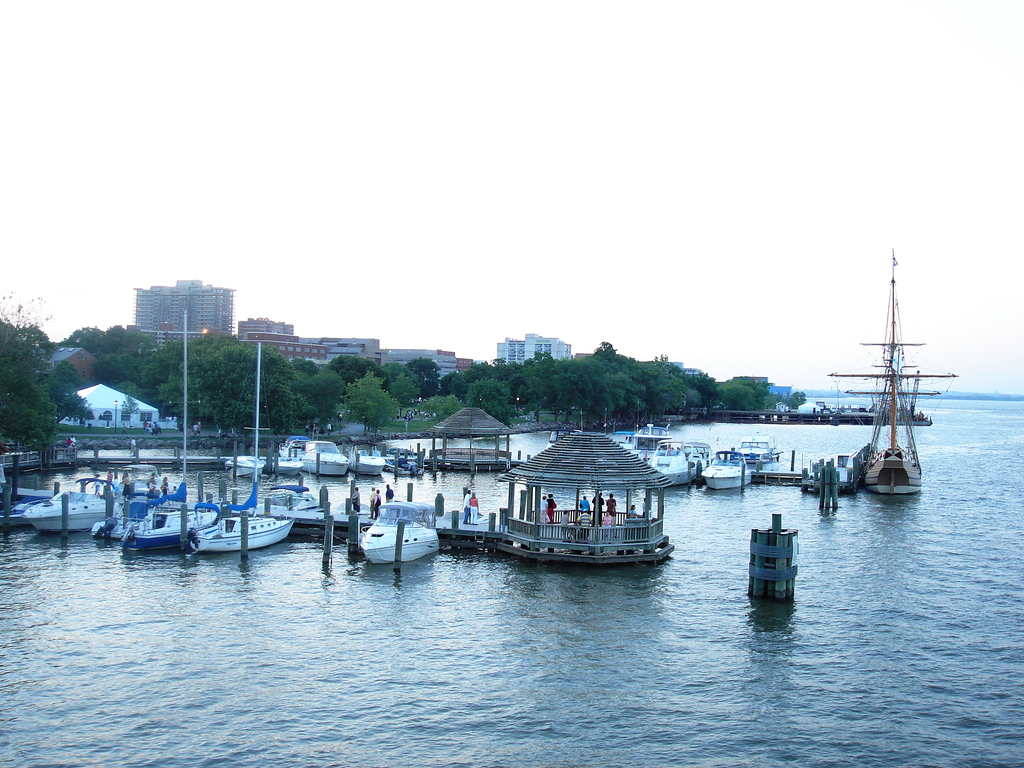
The Alexandria waterfront along the Potomac River

Alexandria has over 900 acres (3.6 km^{2}) of protected open space with 566 acres of city-owned park land and 11 recreation centers, of which Chinquapin Park is one of the largest. Chinquapin Park, built on the site of a demolished military housing development, now offers facilities for swimming, tennis, racquetball, and other sports. Additionally, on March 19, 2024, a year-round recreation center opened inside of the Minnie Howard campus of Alexandria City High School, with a competition size swimming pool and a therapeutic training pool. The city also organizes several sports leagues throughout the year including volleyball, softball and basketball.

The city is home to Cameron Run Regional Park, operated by NOVA Parks, which includes a water park, a miniature golf course, and batting cages. NOVA Parks also operates the Winkler Botanical Preserve in the city's West End. A portion of the Mount Vernon Trail, a popular bike and jogging path, runs through Old Town near the Potomac River on its way from the Mount Vernon Estate to Roosevelt Island in Washington, D.C. There is also a largely unbroken line of parks stretching along the Alexandria waterfront.

== Government ==
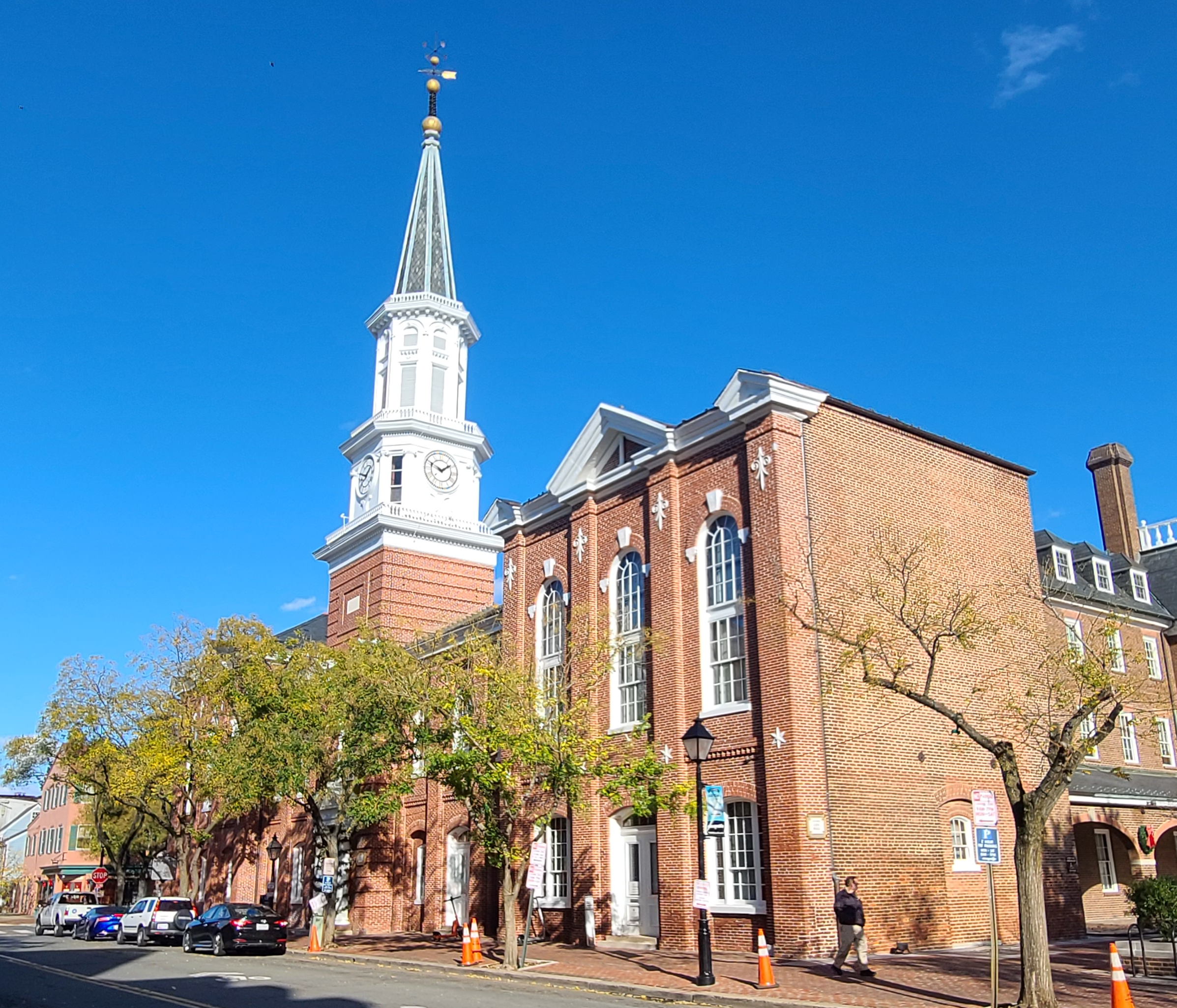
Alexandria City Hall

United States presidential election results for Alexandria, Virginia
Year	Republican		Democratic		Third party(ies)	
Year	No.	%	No.	%	No.	%
1880	994	39.23%	1,540	60.77%	0	0.00%
1884	1,273	42.21%	1,730	57.36%	13	0.43%
1888	1,523	47.52%	1,665	51.95%	17	0.53%
1892	1,162	36.74%	1,982	62.66%	19	0.60%
1896	1,281	40.28%	1,830	57.55%	69	2.17%
1900	935	31.76%	2,003	68.04%	6	0.20%
1904	187	20.06%	738	79.18%	7	0.75%
1908	247	16.77%	1,218	82.69%	8	0.54%
1912	132	10.99%	951	79.18%	118	9.83%
1916	364	25.78%	1,038	73.51%	10	0.71%
1920	921	38.71%	1,417	59.56%	41	1.72%
1924	556	28.37%	1,136	57.96%	268	13.67%
1928	1,617	55.30%	1,307	44.70%	0	0.00%
1932	1,199	28.66%	2,941	70.29%	44	1.05%
1936	1,225	26.34%	3,381	72.71%	44	0.95%
1940	1,802	30.90%	4,004	68.67%	25	0.43%
1944	3,405	43.53%	4,391	56.13%	27	0.35%
1948	3,903	44.83%	3,917	44.99%	887	10.19%
1952	8,579	56.92%	6,471	42.93%	22	0.15%
1956	8,633	52.48%	7,451	45.30%	365	2.22%
1960	8,826	47.58%	9,662	52.08%	63	0.34%
1964	8,825	34.36%	16,828	65.52%	30	0.12%
1968	13,265	41.69%	14,351	45.11%	4,200	13.20%
1972	20,235	55.95%	15,409	42.60%	525	1.45%
1976	16,880	44.53%	19,858	52.38%	1,172	3.09%
1980	17,865	44.23%	17,134	42.42%	5,389	13.34%
1984	21,166	46.77%	23,552	52.05%	535	1.18%
1988	20,913	45.66%	24,358	53.18%	533	1.16%
1992	16,700	31.70%	30,784	58.44%	5,191	9.85%
1996	15,554	34.26%	27,968	61.60%	1,877	4.13%
2000	19,043	34.50%	33,633	60.93%	2,523	4.57%
2004	19,844	32.26%	41,116	66.84%	555	0.90%
2008	19,181	27.26%	50,473	71.73%	710	1.01%
2012	20,249	27.58%	52,199	71.11%	963	1.31%
2016	13,285	17.53%	57,242	75.55%	5,243	6.92%
2020	14,544	17.63%	66,240	80.28%	1,724	2.09%
2024	16,112	19.91%	62,326	77.04%	2,466	3.05%

As an independent city of Virginia (as opposed to an incorporated town within a county), Alexandria derives its governing authority from the Virginia General Assembly using the Dillon Rule. In order to revise the power and structure of the city government, the city must request the General Assembly to amend the charter. The present charter was granted in 1950 and it has been amended in 1968, 1971, 1976, and 1982.

Alexandria adopted a council-manager form of government by way of referendum in 1921. This type of government empowers the elected City Council to pass legislation and appoint the City Manager. The City Manager is responsible for overseeing the city's administration.

The Mayor, who is chosen on a separate ballot, presides over meetings of the Council and serves as the ceremonial head of government. The Mayor does not have the power to veto Council action. Council members traditionally choose the person receiving the most votes in the election to serve as Vice Mayor. In the absence or disability of the Mayor, the Vice Mayor performs the mayoral duties.

City Council
Position	Name	Party	First Election	District
Mayor	Alyia Gaskins	Democratic Party	2024 (previously served as councilmember from 2022 to 2024)	At-Large
Vice Mayor	Sarah R. Bagley	Democratic Party	2021	At-Large
Member	Canek Aguirre	Democratic Party	2018	At-Large
Member	John Taylor Chapman	Democratic Party	2012	At-Large
Member	Abdel Elnoubi	Democratic Party	2024	At-Large
Member	Jacinta Greene	Democratic Party	2024	At-Large
Member	Sandy Marks	Democratic Party	2026	At-Large

In 2024, the city has 55 boards and commissions to advise the City Council on major issues affecting the community. The majority of members are appointed by the City Council. In addition, Alexandria City Public Schools has a school board with nine members. Three are elected from each of the city's three school board districts.

Alexandria has a circuit court and a general district court. The city also has a juvenile and domestic relations district court. All of these courts are located in the Alexandria Courthouse at 520 King Street. The city is also the site of the Alexandria Division of the United States District Court for the Eastern District of Virginia.

In the Virginia General Assembly, Alexandria is represented in the House of Delegates as part of the 3rd district, 4th district, and 5th district. In the Virginia Senate, the city is represented as part of the 39th district. At the federal level, Alexandria is part of Virginia's 8th congressional district, represented by Democrat and Alexandria resident Don Beyer, elected in 2014. The state's senior member of the United States Senate is Democrat Mark Warner, first elected in 2008. The state's junior member of the United States Senate is Democrat Tim Kaine, first elected in 2012.

=== History ===
Since its foundation, Alexandria's government has had several different forms of government. Before 1921, Alexandria had an elected eight-member Board of Aldermen and a sixteen-member Common Council whose members were elected by ward. In addition, there was an elected mayor with the power to veto legislation from the two councils. Reformers within the city during the early 20th century hoped to adopt the then-popular council-manager system. As a means to implementing this new system, the reformists proposed a plan to create a single city council elected at-large. This new system was adopted in 1921 and the first at-large councilmen were elected in June 1922.

In 1930, Alexandria annexed the town of Potomac from Arlington County. Alexandria and Potomac stood in stark contrast. The streetcar suburb commuter town of Potomac had, as part of Arlington, been heavily influenced by the anti-vice crusades of staunch progressive Commonwealth's Attorney Crandal Mackey. In Potomac, slaughterhouses and saloons were banned. Residents of the former town of Potomac had a different identity from those in Alexandria, and after annexation former Potomac residents began to push for the reimplementation of the ward system. In a 1932 referendum, voters decided in favor of a new plan that would expand the city council to nine members; three elected at-large and six elected by ward. Support for the new plan was highest in the former town of Potomac.

City councils elected under the new ward system began to take a more direct role in city administration. The city council and city manager gave conflicting orders to city employees while spending increased to accommodate appropriations coming from both the council and manager. With over one million dollars spent on unauthorized projects, a movement to go back to at-large councilmen emerged. In 1944, a referendum to eliminate the ward system ended with a vote in favor of the ward system. Shortly afterwards, a number of high-ranking city officials resigned, and residents appealed to the Circuit Court for an order to force a referendum. Unbeknownst to the city government, Delegate Armistead Boothe introduced a bill in Richmond to hold another referendum. This bill passed the General Assembly and a vote was held on March 2, 1948. The options in the referendum included retaining the extant system or replacing it with a council of seven at-large members. Voters approved the new system with 61% of votes in favor. More recently, a 1983 push by the Virginia NAACP to return to the ward system failed because of a lack of support from elected officials.

=== Ecocity ===
In 2008 the City Council approved a charter where "citizens, businesses, and city government participate in a vibrant community that is always mindful of the needs and lifestyles of the generations to come". That charter defined sustainability as "meeting our community's present needs while preserving our historic character and ensuring the ability of future generations to meet their own needs". An ecocity is defined as "an ecologically healthy city". In 2022, Alexandria enacted a 5-cent plastic bag tax consistent with the phase-out of lightweight plastic bags in the United States.

=== Public safety ===
Alexandria's primary law enforcement is the Alexandria Police Department (APD) which is led by a Chief of Police who is appointed by city government. In April 2022, Don Hayes was appointed as Chief of Police. As of 2023, the APD employs roughly 300 officers that receive training at the Northern Virginia Criminal Justice Training Academy.

Every four years, Alexandria residents elect a sheriff that leads the Sheriff's Office in overseeing roughly 200 deputies and a detention center for pre-trial and short-term inmates. This jail is used to house pre-trial inmates in federal espionage cases.

The Alexandria Fire Department is the city's fire protection and emergency medical services provider and is led by Fire/EMS Chief Corey A. Smedley. The AFD operates 10 stations throughout the city and employs over 300 fire and EMS professionals.

== Education ==
=== Colleges and universities ===
Virginia Tech's Washington-Alexandria Architecture Center, also known as WAAC, is located on Prince Street in Old Town, offering graduate programs in Urban Affairs and Planning, Public and International Affairs, Architecture, and Landscape Architecture. In 2018, Virginia Tech announced the construction of an "Innovation Campus" in Potomac Yard with graduate programs in computer science and computer engineering. Virginia Commonwealth University operates a Northern Virginia branch of its School of Social Work and The George Washington University also has a campus near the King Street–Old Town station. This campus mainly offers professional and vocational programs, such as an executive MBA program, urban planning and security studies. The city also has a campus of the Northern Virginia Community College. The largest seminary in the Episcopal Church, Virginia Theological Seminary, is located on Seminary Road.

=== Primary and secondary schools ===
The city is served by the Alexandria City Public Schools system. Alexandria's public school system consists of twelve elementary schools for grades Kindergarten through 5th grade, with three of them also offering Pre-K. Two schools, Patrick Henry and Jefferson-Houston, are Pre-K through 8th grade schools while the middle schools, George Washington and Francis C. Hammond, serve 6th through 8th graders. Alexandria City High School serves as the only high school (9th through 12th) for the entire city across two campuses - "Minnie Howard" and "King Street."

The demographics of the public school system contrast with those of the city. In 2008, only 14% of the students at Francis C. Hammond Middle School were non-Hispanic whites, compared to about 60% when looking at the city as a whole. 27% were of Hispanic descent, and 48% were black. About 9% of the school was of Asian descent. In 2004, 62% of school-going children received free lunches; by 2008, that number had decreased to 56%. At George Washington Middle School, 41% of students are non-Hispanic whites, 34% were Hispanic, 21% was black, and 2% of the students were Asian; 52% of students received free lunch. Alexandria City High School follows this trend as well; 23% of the students were classified as non-Hispanic whites, 25% as Hispanic, 44% as black, and 7% of the school was Asian; 47% of all students received free lunch.

Alexandria is home to private schools such as St. Stephen's and St. Agnes School, Bishop Ireton High School, and Episcopal High School. Also in the city are Alexandria Country Day School, Commonwealth Academy, the Basilica School of Saint Mary, St. Rita's Catholic School, Blessed Sacrament School, and Global Health College.

== Infrastructure ==
=== Healthcare ===
Alexandria is served by Inova Alexandria Hospital. The city's health department operates a health clinic at Mark Center in the city's West End and a teen wellness center at Alexandria City High School.

=== Transportation ===
==== Roadways ====
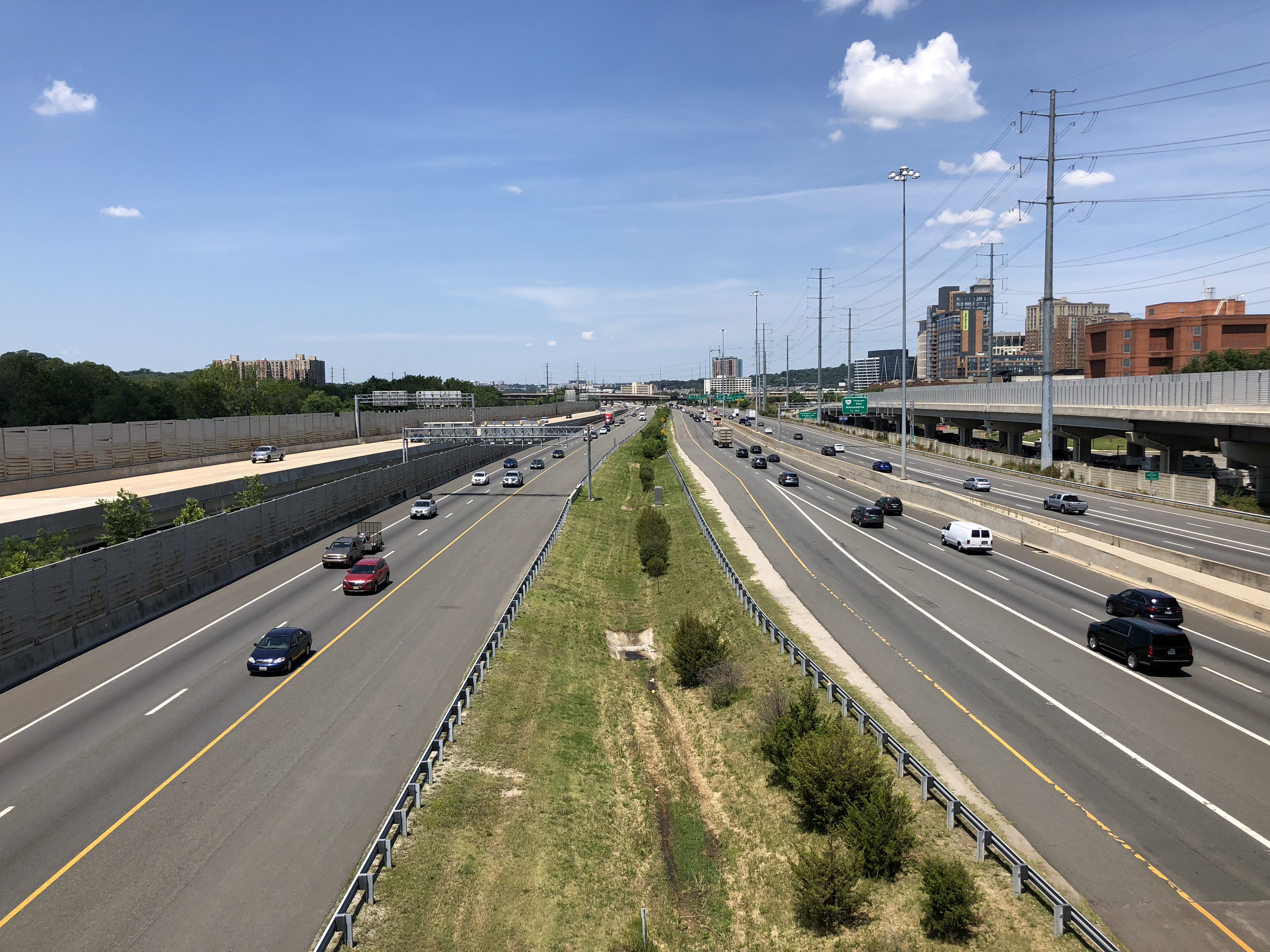
I-95/I-495 (the Capital Beltway), in Alexandria

Concurrent highways I-95 and I-495 (the Capital Beltway), including the Woodrow Wilson Bridge over the Potomac River, roughly parallels the city's southern boundary with Fairfax County before very briefly passing through D.C. and entering Maryland. I-395 crosses north and south through the western part of the city. Alexandria is bisected east and west by SR 7 (King Street). The most western section of King Street in the city was once the terminus of the Leesburg Turnpike. SR 7 terminates at SR 400 (Washington Street), which connects the northern and southern segments of the George Washington Memorial Parkway. SR 236 (Duke Street) runs east–west along the southern side of the city, also terminating at VA 400 in Old Town. Other primary state highways serving Alexandria include the short limited-access SR 241 (Telegraph Road), as well as multiple thoroughfares serving the western side of the city, which are SR 401 (Van Dorn Street), SR 402 (Quaker Lane), and SR 420 (Seminary Road in the west, Janneys Lane in the east). US 1 (Richmond Highway) passes north–south through the city, parallel and west of Washington Street and the George Washington Memorial Parkway. Through Old Town, the highway follows Patrick and Henry streets.

==== Mass and intercity transit ====
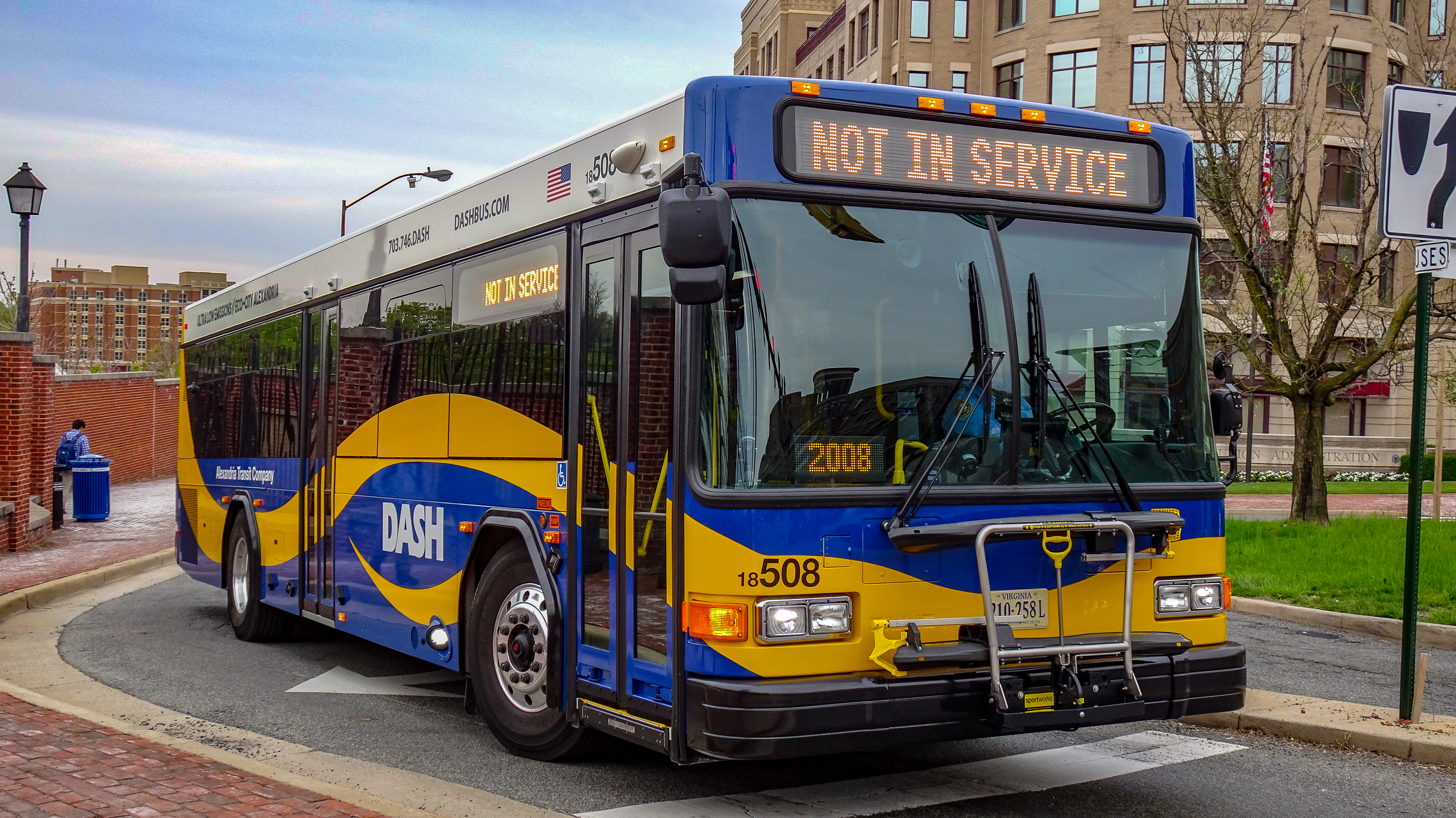
A DASH bus outside of King Street–Old Town station on the Washington Metro

Rapid transit in Alexandria is provided by WMATA's Washington Metrorail. The Metro's Blue and Yellow lines jointly serve the stations of Potomac Yard, Braddock Road, and King Street–Old Town before diverging, with the Blue Line traveling to Van Dorn Street and the Yellow Line traveling to Eisenhower Avenue. Beyond Van Dorn Street and Eisenhower Avenue, the lines reach their respective southern termini in Fairfax County, while north of Potomac Yard, the lines travel through Arlington County to Washington, D.C. and Maryland.

WMATA also offers bus service in Alexandria through various Metrobus routes. Metroway, a bus rapid transit (BRT) line operated by Metrobus, has its southern terminus at Braddock Road station. Alexandria plans to construct two additional BRT lines, with one following Duke Street and the other running along the city's West End. The city runs its own municipal bus system, DASH. In addition to its regularly branded buses, DASH offers a "King Street Trolley" trolley-replica bus line that connects King Street–Old Town station to the Potomac River waterfront via King Street in Old Town. Since 2021, DASH is fare-free. Some Fairfax Connector buses also operate in Alexandria.

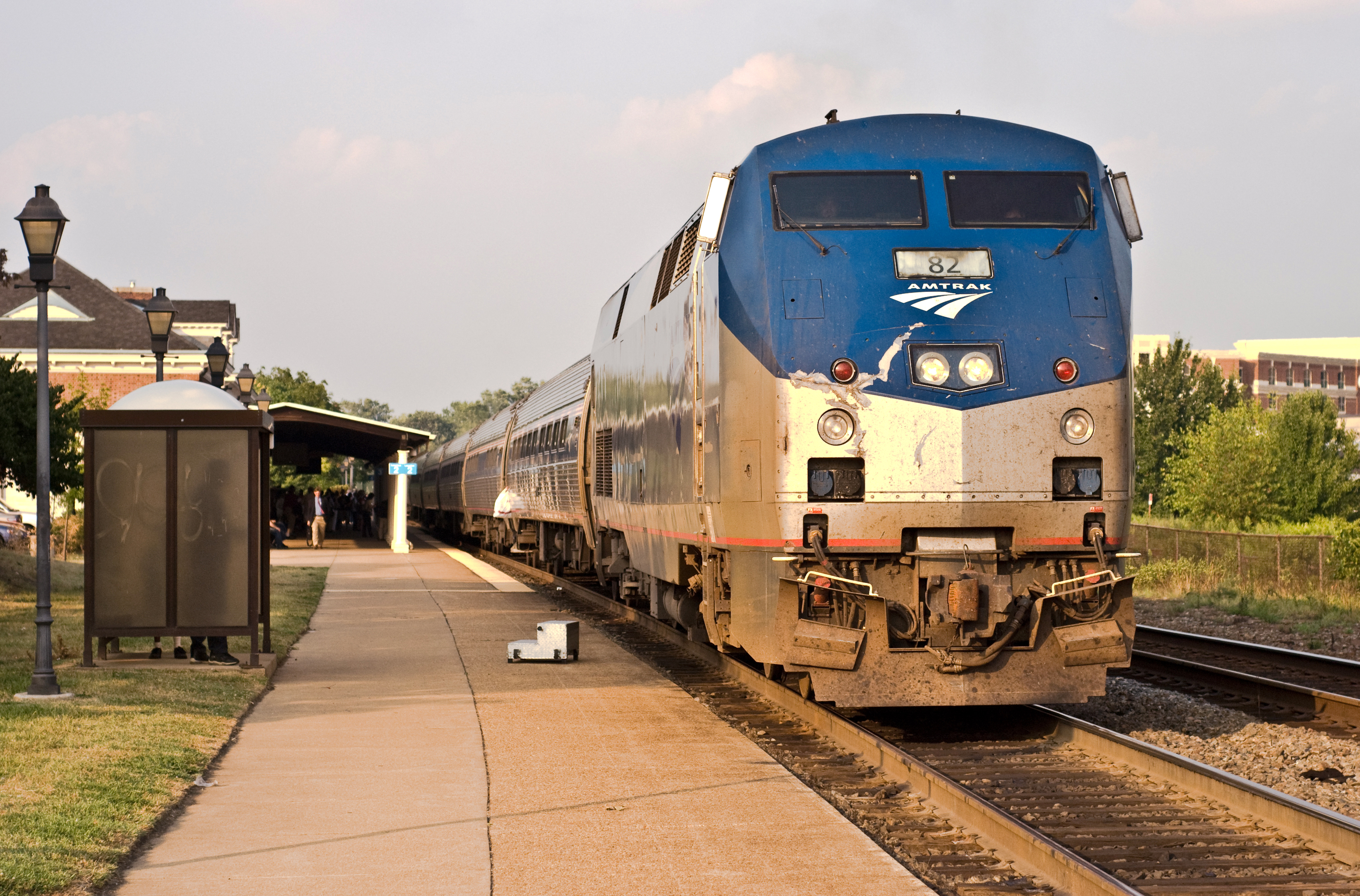
Southbound Amtrak train at Alexandria Union Station

Alexandria Union Station is the city's historic passenger rail station. Located alongside Metro's King Street–Old Town stop, the two stations collectively serve as a major transportation hub for Alexandria. Five Amtrak lines, namely Cardinal, Northeast Regional, Carolinian, Crescent, and Palmetto, provide inter-city rail service at Union Station. Union Station is also the southernmost of four "inner stations" that are served by both commuter rail lines of the Virginia Railway Express, the Manassas and Fredericksburg Lines, as the lines diverge south of the station. MARC, Maryland's commuter rail system, plans for Union Station to be the southern terminus of some trains on its Penn and Brunswick Lines by 2040. The traditional boundary between Old Town and the latterly annexed sections of the city follows the railway acquired by Virginia in 2021 and formerly owned by CSX Transportation. In addition, Norfolk Southern Railway operates a freight rail line and a transload terminal in the city.

Hornblower Cruises operates the Potomac Water Taxi, a private water taxi service, to and from Georgetown and The Wharf development in D.C. and the National Harbor development in Prince George's County.

Capital Bikeshare, a bicycle-sharing public transportation system, launched in Alexandria in 2012. The system has 62 rental locations throughout the city. The East Coast Greenway and Mount Vernon Trail cycle routes pass through Alexandria.

== Notable people ==
- Diedrich Bader, actor
- Don Beyer, U.S. representative, former U.S. Ambassador to Switzerland and Liechtenstein and Lieutenant Governor of Virginia
- Hannibal Brumskine III, internet entrepreneur
- Dave Bautista, pro wrestler and actor
- Sandra Bullock, actress
- Stewart Copeland, drummer for The Police
- Diana Davis, ice dancer
- Leon Day, Hall of Fame baseball pitcher who played in the Negro leagues
- Elena Delle Donne, forward-guard, Washington Mystics, WNBA champion, two-time league MVP
- Stefon Diggs, wide receiver for the New England Patriots
- Donna Dixon, former actress, model
- William O. Douglas, American jurist who served as an Associate Justice of the Supreme Court of the US 1939–75, and environmentalist resided in Old Town for four decades
- Chad Dukes, Alexandria, Virginia radio personality, pioneer in podcasting
- Marion Moncure Duncan, 25th President General of the Daughters of the American Revolution
- Cass Elliot and John Phillips of The Mamas & The Papas
- Charles Bernadou Elliott (1882–1958), US Army colonel, raised and educated in Alexandria
- Charles Esten, actor, singer
- Alice Catherine Evans (1881–1975), microbiologist
- Margaret Fetterolf, previously unidentified murder victim discovered in Woodlawn, Baltimore County, Maryland in 1976, identified in 2021
- Gerald Ford, former President of the United States, lived at 1521 Mount Eagle Place in Parkfairfax, and later at 514 Crown View Drive, where he lived during his term as vice president and for the first ten days of his presidency
- Rick Franklin, a Piedmont blues guitarist, singer and songwriter, was born in Alexandria
- Dave Grohl, founder and frontman of Foo Fighters, drummer for Nirvana
- Tom Harkin, former U.S. Senator from Iowa
- Moses Hepburn, first African American town councilor of West Chester, Pennsylvania
- Sarah Gibson Jones, African American educator, journalist, poet, lecturer, and clubwoman
- Archie Kao, actor, who grew up in Alexandria and graduated from George Mason University in nearby Fairfax, Virginia.
- Thomas Kail, theater director
- Angus King, U.S. Senator for the state of Maine
- Gregory Lawler, mathematician who won the 2019 Wolf Prize in mathematics
- Henry Lee III, often known by his nickname "Light-Horse Harry", Revolutionary War lieutenant colonel, Virginia Governor, father of Robert E. Lee moved to Alexandria in 1810
- Robert E. Lee, Civil War general, grew up on Oronoco Street
- Thad Levine, general manager of Minnesota Twins, was born in Alexandria
- Emma Louise Lowe, American musician, educator, former First Lady of American Samoa and former First Lady of Guam
- Noah Lyles, Olympian
- Serena McIlwain, secretary of the Maryland Department of the Environment
- Scott McKenzie, musician
- Jim Morrison of The Doors lived at 310 Woodland Terrace 1959–61
- David Lynch, filmmaker
- Dean Muhtadi, former American football player and former WWE wrestler
- Dermot Mulroney, American Actor, known for his role in My Best Friend's Wedding, among others
- Mick Mulvaney, Director of the Office of Management and Budget and former U.S. Congressman representing South Carolina, born in Alexandria
- Richard Nixon, former President of the United States, lived at 3426 Gunston Rd in Parkfairfax
- Sandie Pendleton, Lieutenant Colonel in the C.S. Army, Adjutant to Stonewall Jackson and other Confederate Generals.
- Eddie Royal, Chicago Bears wide receiver
- Willard Scott, national television personality, grew up in Rosemont
- Mikie Sherrill, U.S. representative, 57th Governor of New Jersey
- Gleb Smolkin, ice dancer
- Garren Stitt, actor known for his roles in General Hospital and Andi Mack
- Nicholas Trist, Diplomat who negotiated the Treaty of Guadeloupe Hidalgo
- Kali Uchis, singer
- Wernher von Braun, NASA rocket scientist, residence on Vicar Lane, buried in Ivy Hill Cemetery
- Ella Wall Van Leer, American artist, architect and women's rights activist
- Mark Warner, U.S. Senator, 69th Governor of Virginia
- George Washington, owned a house in Alexandria where he would stay while conducting business. He was also active in the local government and masonic lodge.
- Richard Hooker Wilmer, former Episcopal bishop, second Bishop of Alabama
- Megan Young, Miss World Philippines 2013 and Miss World 2013
- Steven Pruitt, Wikipedian editor and administrator

== Sister cities ==
Alexandria has four sister cities:

- Gyumri, Shirak Province, Armenia
- Helsingborg, Skåne County, Sweden
- Dundee, Scotland
- Caen, Calvados, France

Alexandria was twinned with Gyumri as a means of showing goodwill in the wake of the 1988 Armenian earthquake.

== See also ==
- National Register of Historic Places listings in Alexandria, Virginia
- Wales Brewery
