= Jones Point =

Jones Point may refer to:

- Jones Point, New York, a hamlet in Stony Point in Rockland County
- Jones Point (Antarctica), a point within Wilhelmina Bay
- Jones Point (Virginia), a point on the Potomac River
