= SS Gunston Hall =

American merchant vessel

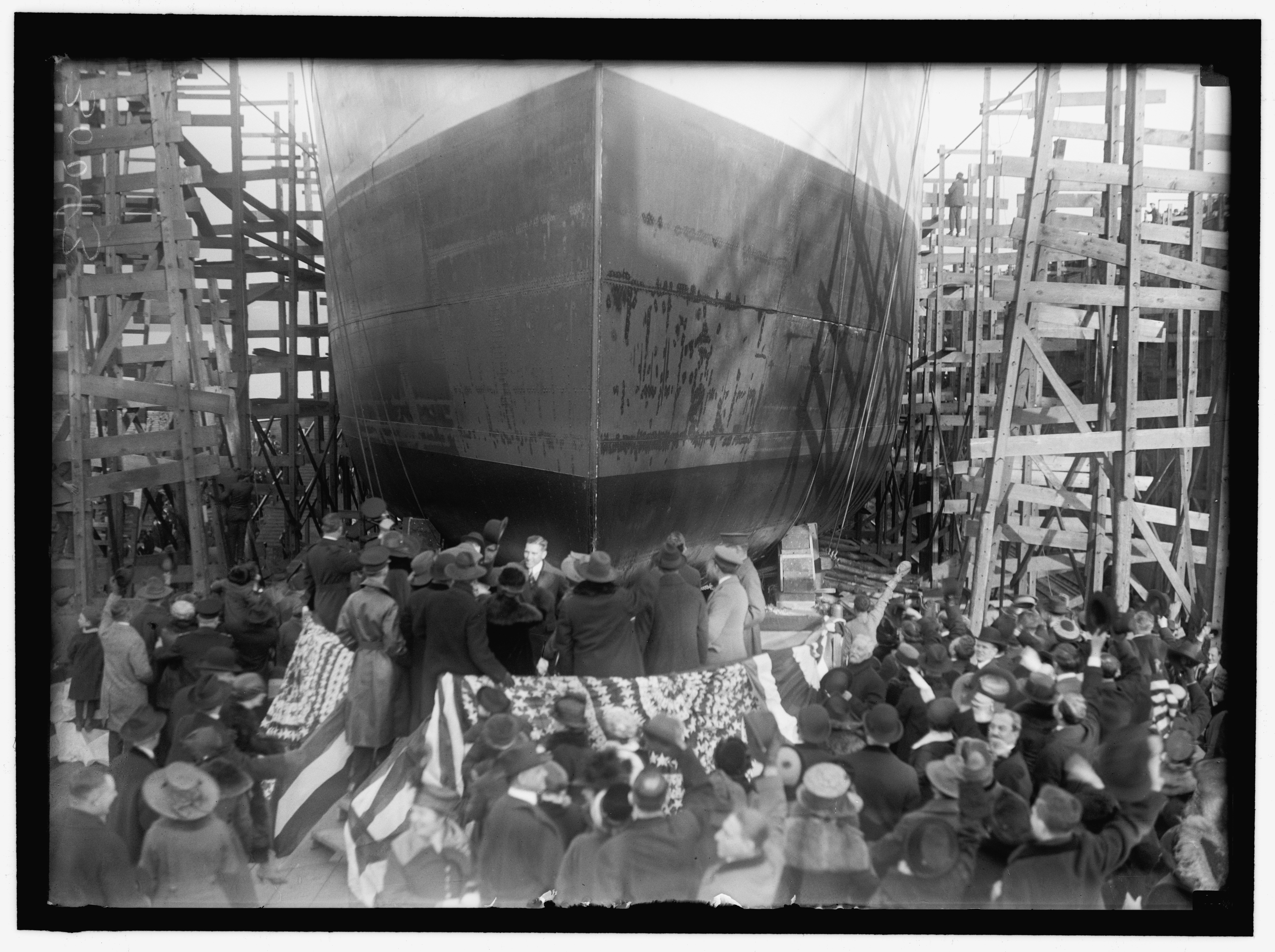

History
- Name: Gunston Hall
- Builder: Virginia Shipbuilding Corporation
- Yard number: 1
- Laid down: May 30, 1918
- Launched: February 27, 1919
- Fate: Scrapped, 1930

General characteristics
- Class & type: Design 1015 ship
- Type: Cargo ship
- Tonnage: 9,455 dwt
- Length: 402 ft 0 in (122.53 m)
- Beam: 53 ft 0 in (16.15 m)
- Draft: 32 ft 0 in (9.75 m)

SS Gunston Hall was a Design 1015 steel-hulled cargo ship built in 1919 by the Virginia Shipbuilding Corporation for the United States Shipping Board's Emergency Fleet Corporation. Initially intended for service in World War I, Gunston Hall was not completed until after the war's end. The ship was sold for scrap in 1930.

== Construction ==
In 1918, the Virginia Shipbuilding Corporation received a government contract to construct 12 Design 1015 cargo ships for the Emergency Fleet Corporation. The keel of the first ship was laid on May 30, 1918, at the company's new shipyard in Alexandria, Virginia. President Woodrow Wilson was at the shipyard to drive the first rivet, saying, "I haven't got my union card, but I guess it's all right!" First Lady Edith Wilson announced the first ship would be named Gunston Hall after George Mason's home of the same name.

Gunston Hall was launched on February 27, 1919, and was christened by the wife of Virginia Shipbuilding Corporation general manager and vice president Benjamin W. Morse.

== Operational history ==
In 1919, the Virginia Shipbuilding Corporation purchased or leased all of the ships, including Gunston Hall, it had built for the Emergency Fleet Corporation, intending to pay for them by operating them a private merchant vessels.

Gunston Hall left the port of Baltimore in November 1919. The ship was loaded in New York and traveled to Bordeaux. Leaving France, Gunston Hall put into Gibraltar before sailing to Buenos Aires. After loading grain bound for Dunkirk, France, Gunston Hall put to sea on February 19, 1920. However, the ship broke down and had to be towed into port on Saint Vincent on March 19, 1920. Gunston Hall remained there until July 30, 1920, until she was towed across the Atlantic Ocean to Funchal and finally to Dunkirk, six months after leaving Buenos Aires. The ship was repaired at Dunkirk, after which she loaded a cargo of kainite and manure salts in Antwerp. Gunston Hall sailed for Baltimore via Southampton and New York on or about January 5, 1921, and arrived on February 24, 1921. By July 1921, Gunston Hall was laid up with 30 other Shipping Board steamers in the James River near Norfolk, Virginia.

Various investigations into the Virginia Shipbuilding Corporation alleged that government funds intended to construct ships had been misused for shipyard construction and a housing project. The government seized the ships, including Gunston Hall, back in 1922.

In September 1929, the Shipping Board invited bids to scrap Gunston Hall and 21 other merchant ships that had been laid up for several years. In 1930, Gunston Hall was sold for scrap to Union Shipbuilding Company in Baltimore, Maryland for $24,769.

== Legacy ==
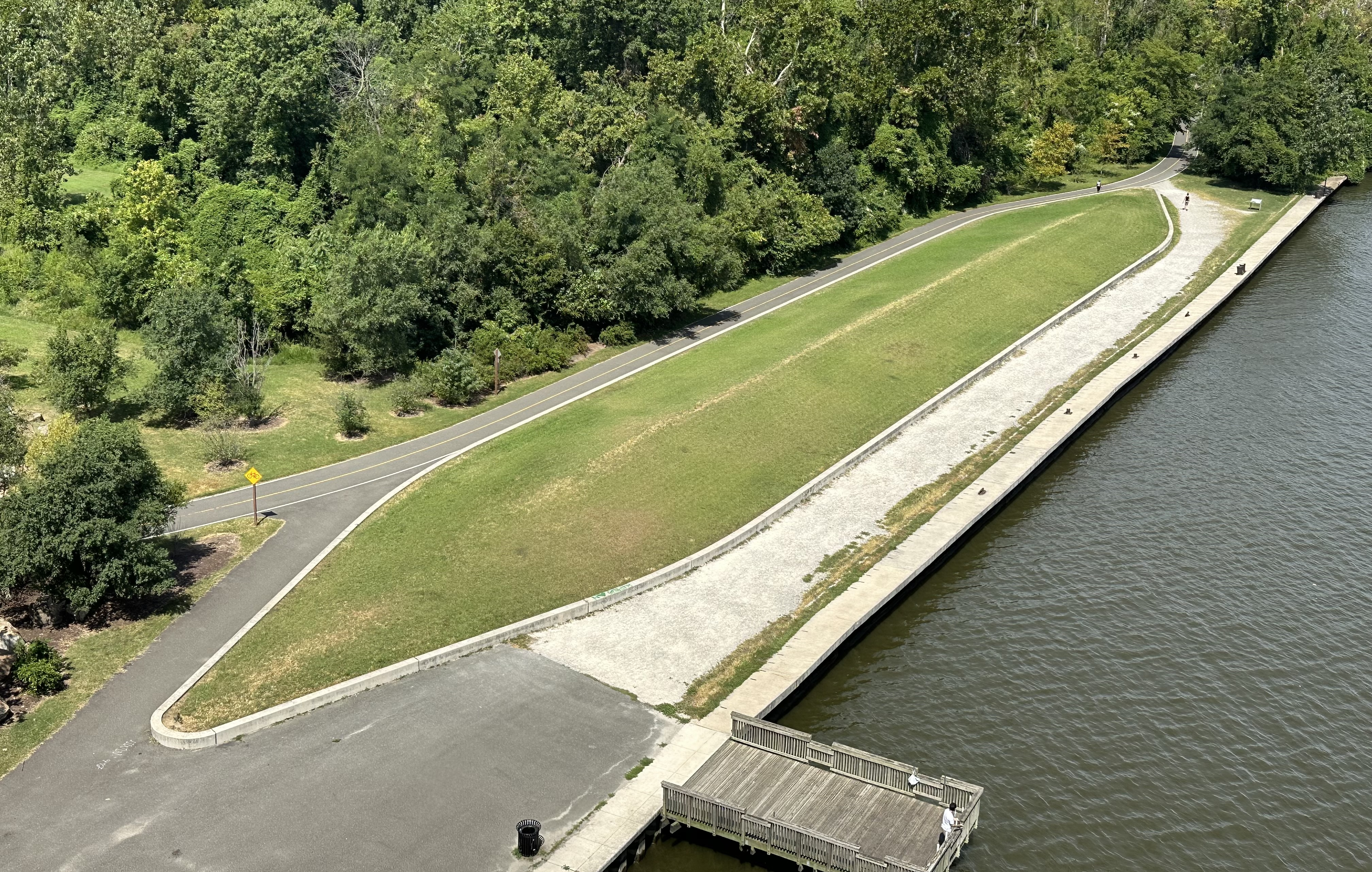
A lawn representing the size of SS Gunston Hall at Jones Point Park in Alexandria, Virginia.

The site of the former Virginia Shipbuilding Corporation shipyard is now in Jones Point Park and is crossed by the Woodrow Wilson Bridge. One of the few visible remnants of the shipyard is the fitting-out dock, next to which is a grass lawn bound by a concrete retaining wall representing the length and width of Gunston Hall's hull.
