= Benjamin Banneker: SW-9 Intermediate Boundary Stone =

- Benjamin Banneker: SW 9 Intermediate Boundary Stone
- U.S. National Register of Historic Places
- U.S. National Historic Landmark
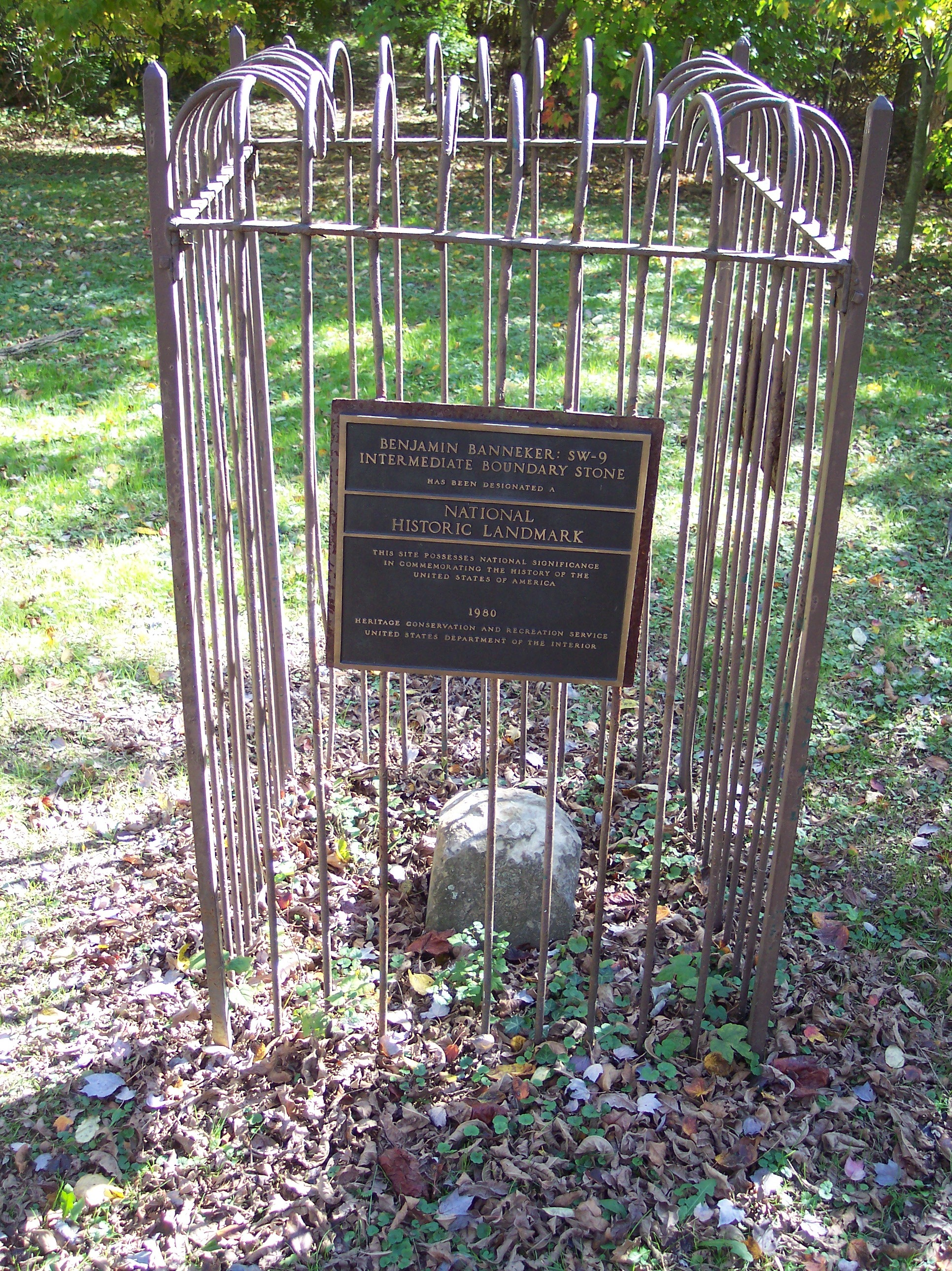
- SW9 Boundary Stone (2012)

- Location within Northern Virginia Location within Virginia Location within the United States
- Location: 18th and Van Buren Sts., Arlington and Falls Church, Virginia
- Coordinates: 38°52′58.6″N 77°9′32.6″W
- Built: 1792
- NRHP reference No.: 76002094

Significant dates
- Added to NRHP: May 11, 1976
- Designated NHL: May 11, 1976

Benjamin Banneker: SW 9 Intermediate Boundary Stone, also known as an Intermediate Stone of the District of Columbia, is a surveyors' boundary marker stone. The stone is located on the original boundary of the District of Columbia (see: Boundary markers of the original District of Columbia and History of Washington, D.C.) The stone is now on the boundary of Arlington County, Virginia and the City of Falls Church. It is within the two jurisdiction's Benjamin Banneker Park at 6620 18th Street North, Arlington.

The marker stone was named and declared a National Historic Landmark in 1976 at the instigation of the Afro-American Bicentennial Corporation. The name of the marker honors Benjamin Banneker, a free African American astronomer who in 1792 assisted in the early part of the survey that established the original boundaries of the District of Columbia. The stone was the first of the District of Columbia boundary markers to be listed on the National Register of Historic Places.

== Description and history ==
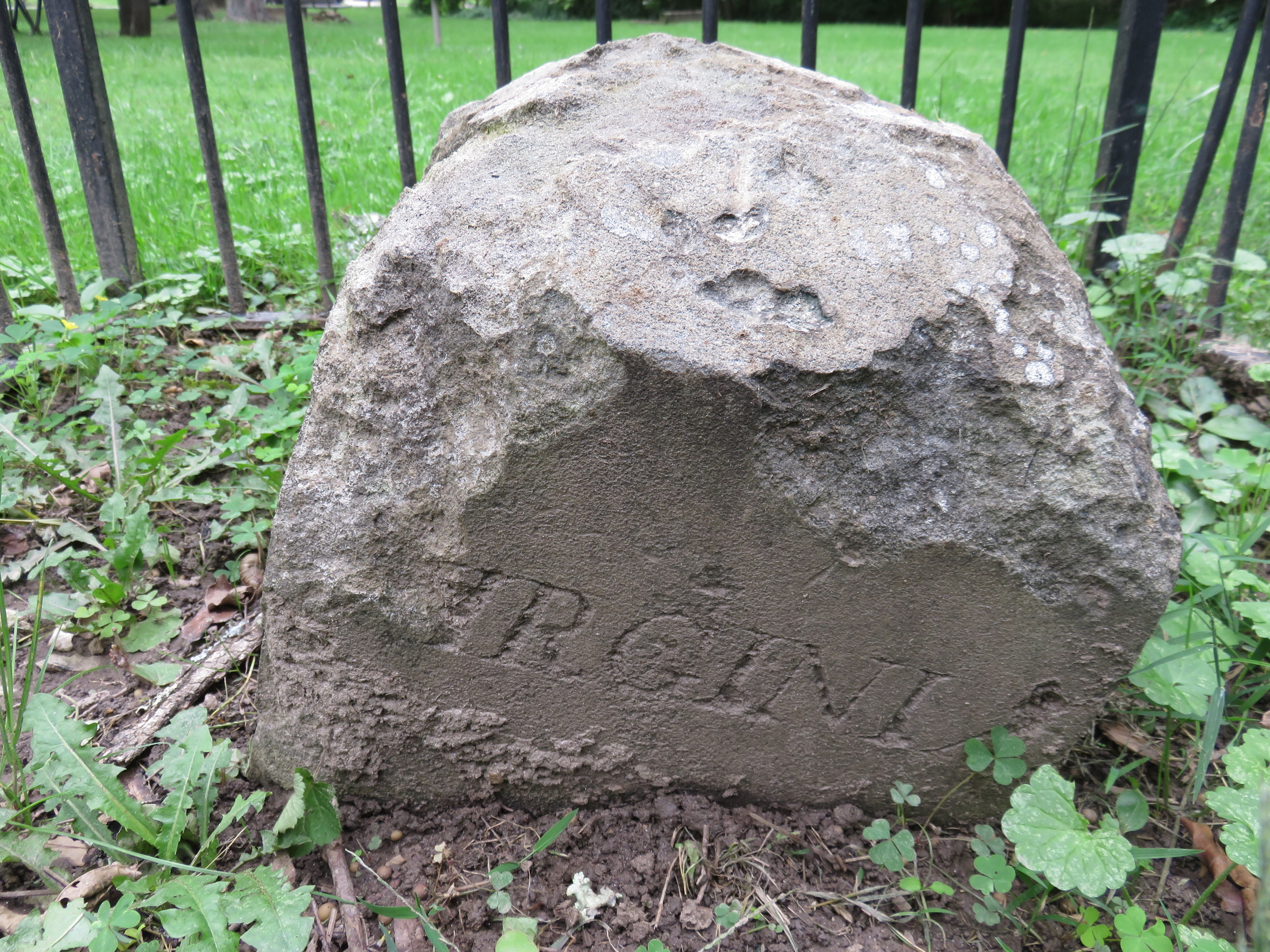
The Virginia side of the marker

The boundary stone is a sandstone block about 1 foot (0.30 m) square in cross section, extending about 15 inches (38 cm) above ground and probably about 2 feet (0.61 m) below ground. The top is rounded and worn. Standardized inscriptions placed on each side of the stone are only partially visible, due in part to the stone's sinking over time.

The words "Jurisdiction of the United States" are inscribed on the northeast side, which faced the federal territory (once the District of Columbia; now Arlington County). The opposite side now facing the City of Falls Church contains the remnant of the word "Virginia". Between those two sides, one side contains the year "1791", while the opposite side contains the remnant of an inscription recording the variation of the compass needle at the stone's location (indicated as "Var."). A brass marker was once mounted top of the stone, placed in early 1900s by the Daughters of the American Revolution; it has since been removed.

Benjamin Banneker (1731-1806) was a free African American mathematician and astronomer who assisted Andrew Ellicott during the first three months of the 1792–1793 survey of the District of Columbia's original boundaries. The stone is one of 40 markers that once lined the District's boundaries. Banneker had left the survey before Ellicott's team laid this and most of the other boundary marker stones.

== See also ==
- List of National Historic Landmarks in Virginia
- National Register of Historic Places listings in Arlington County, Virginia
