= Boundary markers of the original District of Columbia =

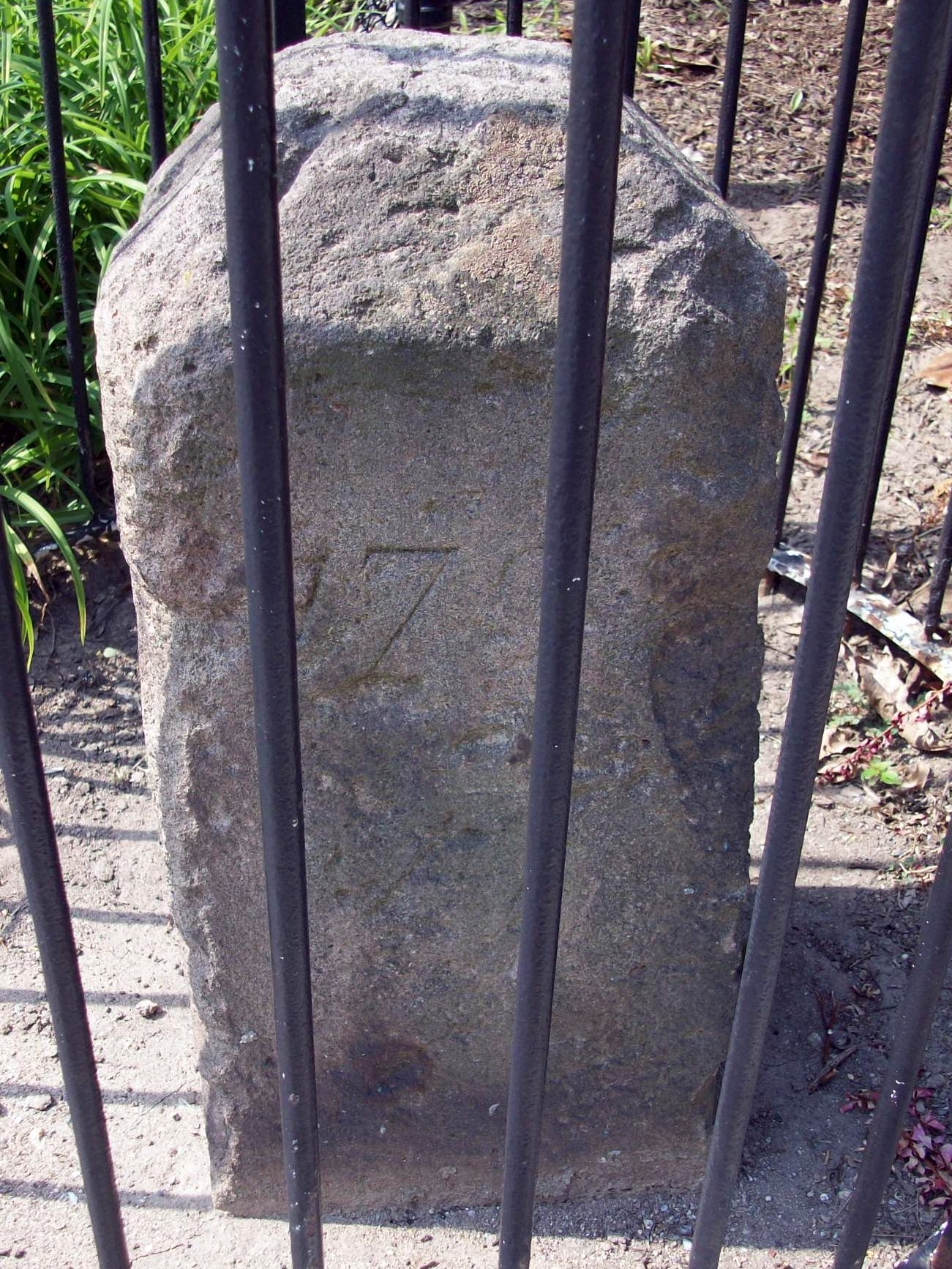
Northeast No. 2 Boundary Marker, along D.C./Maryland line, at 6980 Maple Street NW, Washington, D.C., with fence erected by the DAR

The boundary markers of the original District of Columbia are the 40 milestones that marked the four lines forming the boundaries between the states of Maryland and Virginia and the square of 100 square miles (259 km^{2}) of federal territory that became the District of Columbia in 1801 (see: Founding of the District of Columbia). Working under the supervision of three commissioners that President George Washington had appointed in 1790 in accordance with the federal Residence Act, a surveying team led by Major Andrew Ellicott placed these markers in 1791 and 1792. Among Ellicott's assistants were his brothers Joseph and Benjamin Ellicott, Isaac Roberdeau, George Fenwick, Isaac Briggs and an African American astronomer, Benjamin Banneker.

Today, 36 of the original marker stones survive as the oldest federally placed monuments in the United States. Thirteen of these markers are now within Virginia due to the return of the portion of the District south and west of the Potomac River to Virginia in 1846 (see: District of Columbia retrocession).

== Geography ==
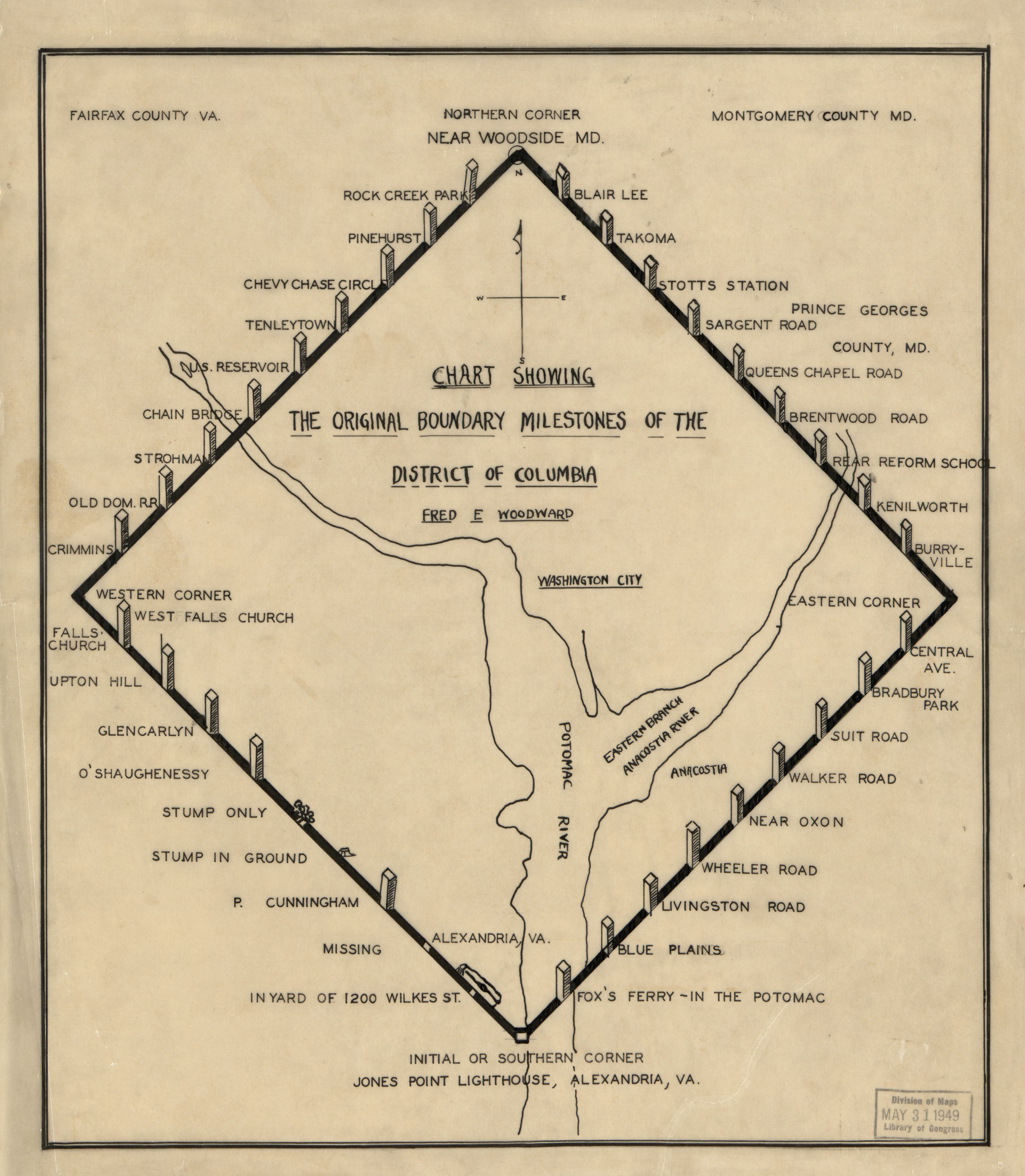
Map of the boundary stones

The District of Columbia (initially, the Territory of Columbia) was originally specified to be a square 100 square miles (260 km^{2}) in area, with the axes between the corners of the square running north-south and east-west, The square had its southern corner at the southern tip of Jones Point in Alexandria, Virginia, at the confluence of the Potomac River and Hunting Creek (later the site of the Jones Point Lighthouse). The sides of the square were each 10 miles (16 km) long. The specified orientation results in a diamond shape for the District's original boundaries on most maps.

The north-south axis of the District's current boundaries extends southward from the District's north corner near East-West Highway (Maryland Route 410), travels between 17th and 18th Streets, N.W., and continues south across the National Mall to the far shore of the Potomac River; the east-west axis is between the present Constitution Avenue and C Street, N.E. and N.W.

These axes are not the lines used to define the four geographical quadrants of the District (N.E., N.W., S.E., and S.W.), commonly appended to Washington street addresses, which are delimited generally by North Capitol Street, East Capitol Street, South Capitol Street, and the National Mall. The center of the square is west of the Ellipse and north of the Mall, within the grounds of the headquarters of the Organization of American States.

In 2011, the District of Columbia geographic information system (GIS) program completed a project to map the District's boundary using Global Positioning System (GPS) and contemporary survey technology at an accuracy of ±5 centimetres (2.0 in) horizontally and ±9 centimetres (3.5 in) vertically. The GIS program's survey found that (listed in the order in which Andrew Ellicott's team performed the initial boundary survey):

- Along the northwest boundary, the stones are outside the existing boundary ranging from 4.43 feet (1.35 m) to 9.6 feet (2.93 m)
- Along the northeast boundary, the stones are inside the existing boundary ranging from 6.6 feet (2.01 m) to 8.4 feet (2.56 m)
- Along the southeast boundary, the stones are outside the existing boundary ranging from 12.75 feet (3.89 m) to 18.48 feet (5.63 m)

The overall accuracy of the historic survey and the survey using 2011 technology produced remarkably similar results. For example, the distance between Southeast stones numbers 6 and 7 is 5,280.824 feet (1,609.5952 m), almost exactly one mile (5,280 feet (1,609.3440 m)).

The stones are located alongside streets, in public parks, deep in the woods and on personal property. Homeowners with stones on their property are generally willing to let the curious take a closer look if they are respectful.

== Placement of the boundary stones ==
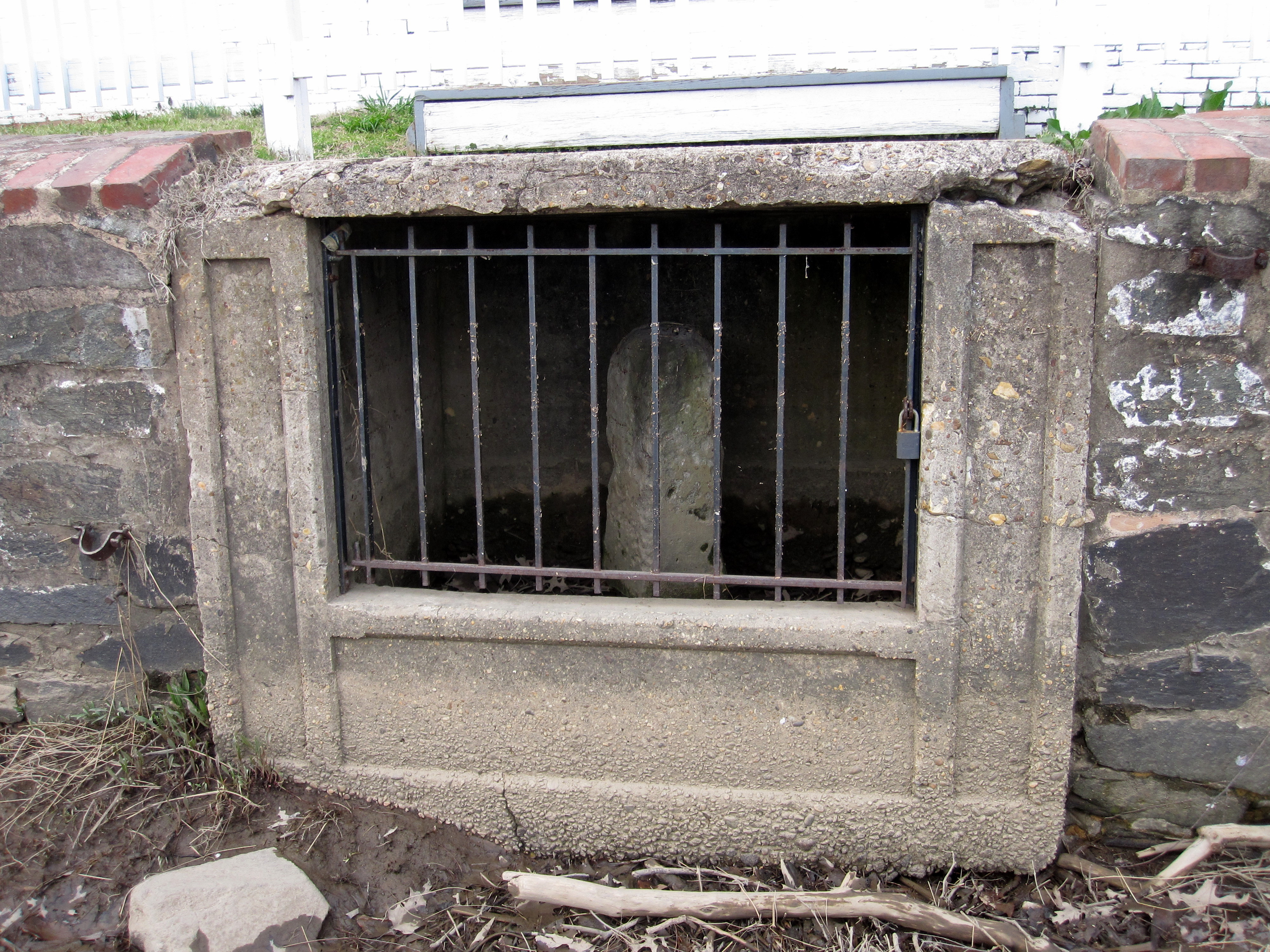
South corner stone within seawall south of the Jones Point Lighthouse in Alexandria, Virginia (2010)

On March 30, 1791, President George Washington issued a proclamation that established ″Jones's point, the upper cape of Hunting Creek in Virginia″ as the starting point for the federal territory's boundary survey. Acting in accordance with instructions in the proclamation, the survey team then began its work at the square's south corner on the shoreline of the point, which was at the southeast corner of Alexandria, Virginia. On April 15, 1791, officials dedicated the south corner stone in an elaborate Masonic ceremony at a point that Andrew Ellicott had determined.

The survey team then cleared a corridor along the boundary route to facilitate surveying, traveling clockwise from the point and placing sandstone boundary markers at the four corners and at intervals of about one mile. The markers were quarried near Aquia Creek in Virginia. Most weighed about a half-ton at their emplacement; the four cornerstones were slightly larger. The Virginia stones were set in 1791, and the Maryland ones in 1792. The map on the web page "Boundary Stones of the District of Columbia" identifies the location of each of the four corner stones, and those of the still-in-place intermediate stones.

The side of a boundary marker that faced the federal territory was inscribed "Jurisdiction of the United States" and with the distance in miles and poles from the previous corner stone. The opposite side was marked with the name of the border state: Virginia or Maryland. The remaining sides were marked with the year that the team placed the stones and with the variation ("Var.") of the compass needle at that place.

On January 1, 1793, Andrew Ellicott submitted to the commissioners a report that stated that the boundary survey had been completed and that all of the boundary marker stones had been set in place. Ellicott's report described the marker stones and contained a map that showed the boundaries and topographical features of the Territory of Columbia. The map identified the locations within the Territory of the planned City of Washington and its major streets, as well as the location of each boundary marker stone.

The sides of the Southeast No. 6 boundary marker stone on August 17, 2011:

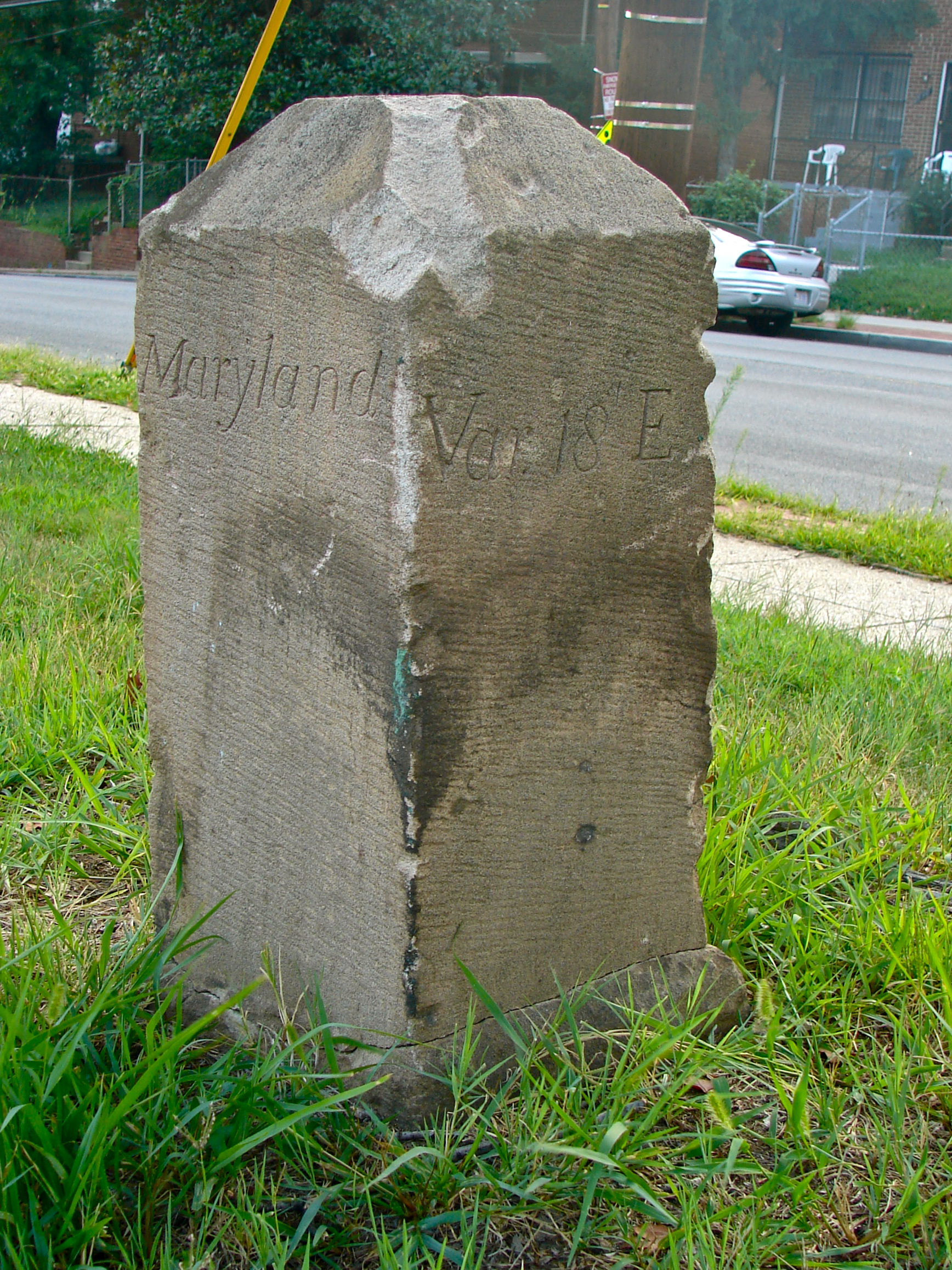
From north

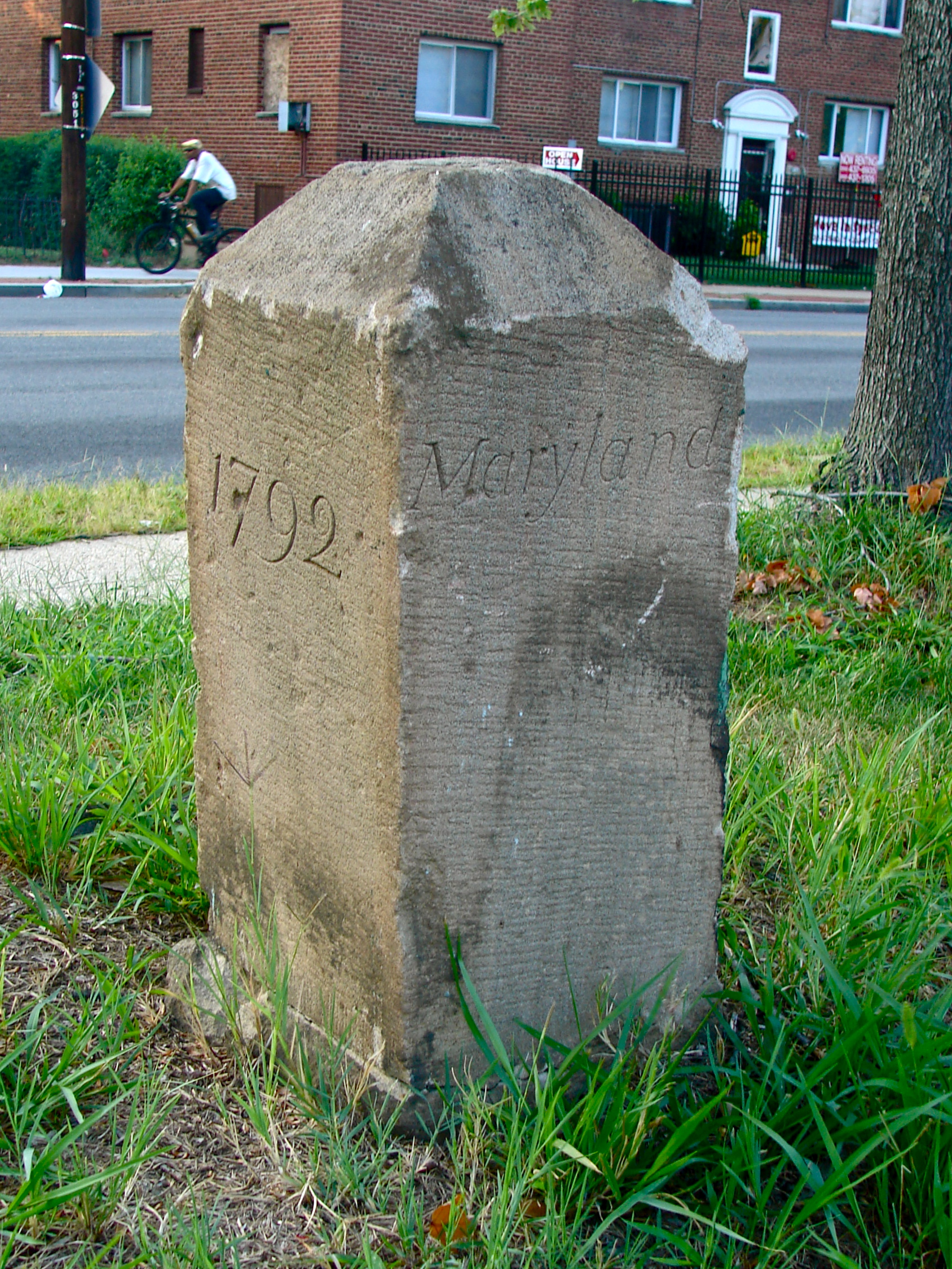
From east

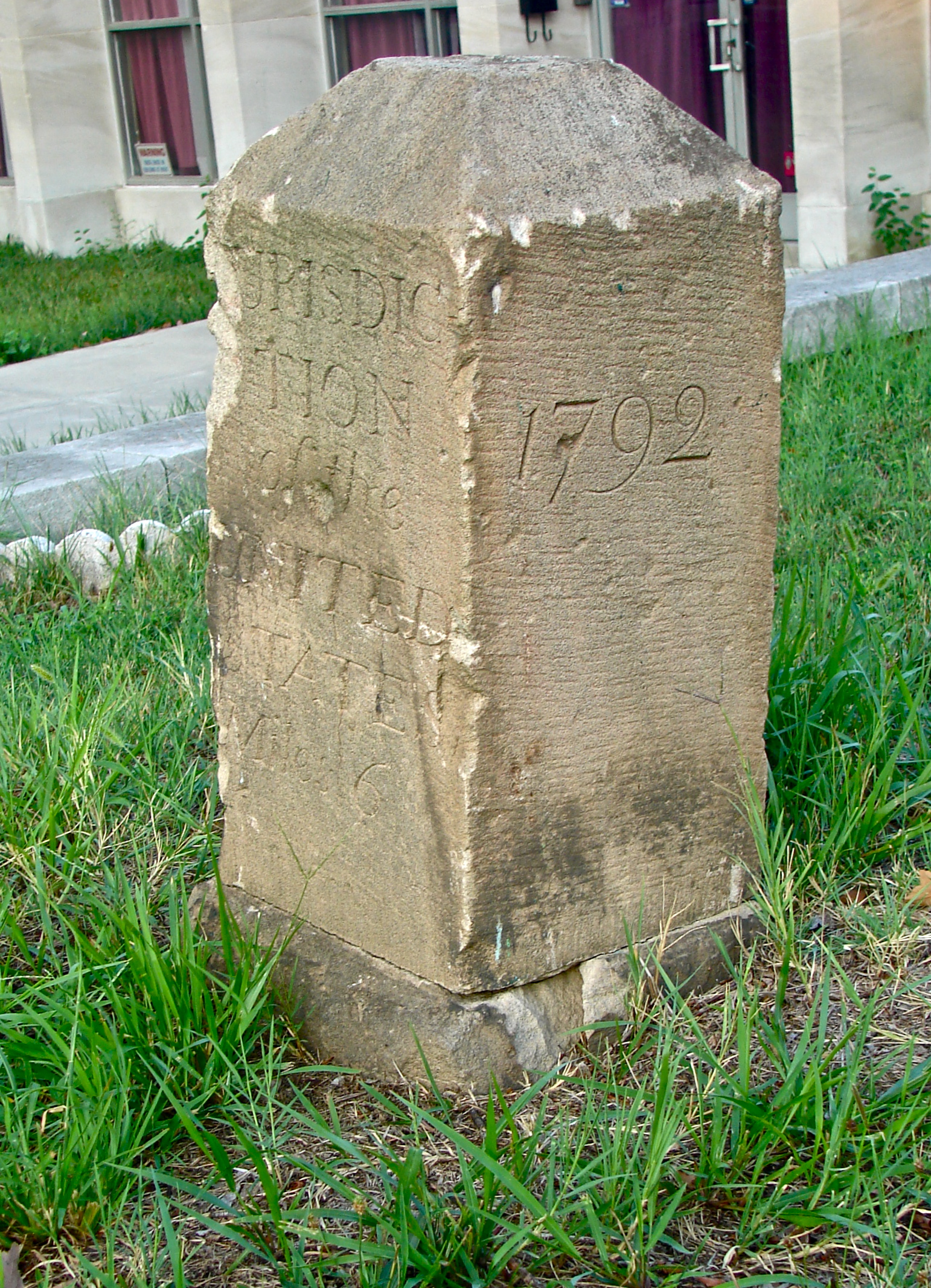
From south

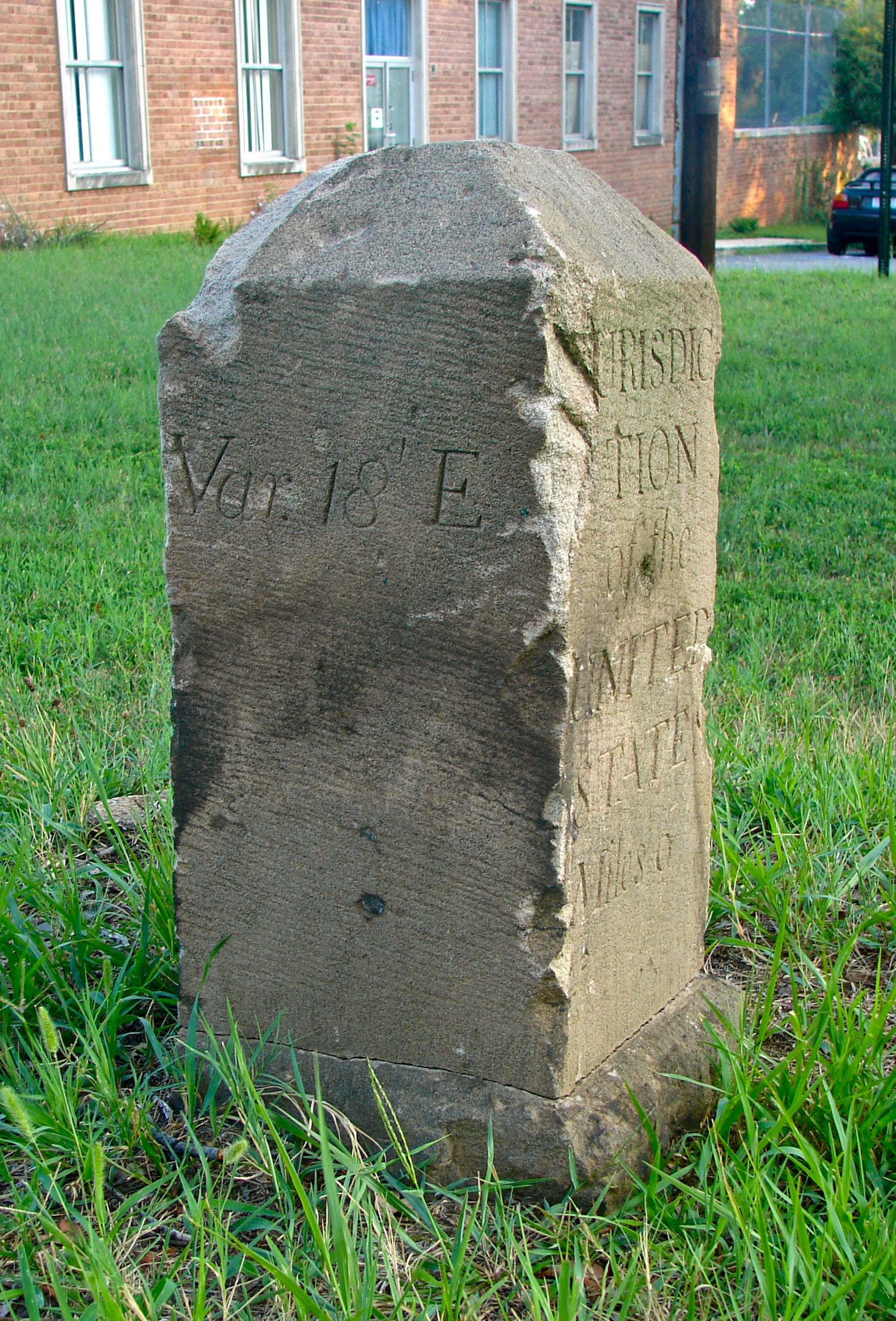
From west

== Protection and historical designations ==
Enlargeable 1908 composite photo by Ernest A. Shuster of the D.C. boundary stones and their sites prior to fencing in 1915

=== Protection ===
In 1906, Fred E. Woodward read a paper to the Columbia Historical Society that described the history, location and conditions of each of the remaining boundary stones, together with photographs of each. His paper concluded by recommending that the stones be protected by placing small fences around each one. In 1909, Ernest A. Shuster of the United States Geological Survey wrote an article for the National Geographic Magazine that described his visits to the 36 remaining boundary stones and that urged their protection and preservation.

In 1915, various local chapters of the Daughters of the American Revolution (DAR) began to place fences around each of the markers. The DAR also placed at the exact center of the original federal territory a marker stone that was located about a half of a mile from the White House and was near the DAR's Memorial Continental Hall.

=== Historical designations ===
One Virginia boundary marker was added to the National Register of Historic Places in 1976, and another in 1980. In 1991, the remaining Virginia boundary markers were added to the National Register in response to a Multiple Property Submission that the Virginia DAR had submitted. In 1996, 23 marker stones along the boundary between the District of Columbia and Maryland were added to the National Register in response to registration forms that the District of Columbia government had submitted for each of the stones. Each of the District's registration forms referenced the documentation in the Multiple Property Submission for the Virginia markers.

=== Virginia ===
Southwest 9. This boundary marker in Falls Church, Virginia was added to the National Register of Historic Places, and further was named a U.S. National Historic Landmark, in 1976 at the instigation of the Afro-American Bicentennial Corporation, which gave the stone its name: Benjamin Banneker: SW-9 Intermediate Boundary Stone. It was the first of the boundary markers to be listed on the National Register of Historic Places.

South Corner. This boundary marker in Virginia was added to the National Register of Historic Places in 1980, together with Alexandria's Jones Point Lighthouse. In 1794, the marker replaced the marker that officials had dedicated during the 1791 Masonic ceremony.

Southwest 1, 2, 3, 4, 5, 6, 7, and 8; West Corner; Northwest 1, 2, and 3. These boundary markers in Virginia were added to the National Register of Historic Places on February 1, 1991 in response to the Multiple Property Submission cited above.

=== District of Columbia and Maryland ===
Northwest 4, 5, 6, 7, 8, and 9; North Corner; Northeast 2, 3, 4, 5, 6, 7, 8, and 9; East Corner; Southeast 1, 2, 3, 5, 6, 7, and 9. These boundary markers, located along the border between the District of Columbia and Maryland, were added to the National Register of Historic Places on November 1, 1996.

=== Preservation efforts ===
In 1976, the National Capital Planning Commission published a report that described the history and condition of each boundary stone. The report recommended that measures be taken to assure the stones' preservation. In 1990 and 1991, a resurveying team to celebrate the boundary markers' bicentennial located two of the then-missing stones.

In 1995, the Northern Virginia Boundary Stones Committee, whose establishment the Northern Virginia Regional Commission (NVRC) had requested, issued a list of recommendations intended to document and preserve the 14 boundary stones that were located in Virginia. The Committee included representatives of the State of Maryland and of Arlington and Fairfax counties and the cities of Alexandria and Falls Church in Virginia.

In 2008, the NVRC announced that four Virginia local governments, including Arlington and Fairfax counties and the cities of Alexandria and Falls Church, had agreed to help fund a project to protect and preserve the boundary stones by providing matching funds to a Transportation Enhancement Grant that the District Department of Transportation (DDOT) had received from the Federal Highway Administration (FHA). The announcement stated that the NVRC was working on an agreement with the DDOT, the National Park Service and the FHA to administer the project.

However, the preservation project had not yet begun by 2012. It appeared that the DDOT no longer had the funds that had been allocated for the project. In the meantime, teams of volunteers had begun to landscape and repaint the fences surrounding the stones. In addition, the District of Columbia DAR restored the Northeast No. 7 boundary marker and its fence in 2012.

In 2014, the National Park Service, the historic preservation staff of the District of Columbia Office of Planning, the DDOT and the DAR initiated an effort to rehabilitate the boundary markers that were located along the District's contemporary boundaries. As part of the project, in January 2015 a DDOT crew unearthed a stone buried in 1962 that had replaced Southeast No. 8, with the intention of cleaning and restoring the marker. However, in 2016, the stone was replaced by a new stone that presumably replicated the appearance of the original stone when the original was new.

== List of boundary stones ==
The 36 extant and four missing boundary stones are tabulated in sequence below, beginning at the southern corner and proceeding clockwise, in the same order as the stones were placed. The tables also contain the year that each stone was listed on the National Register of Historic Places.

=== Southern corner ===
Name	Image	Address	City/County	Coordinates	Status	Year Listed
South Cornerstone of the Original District of Columbia	2010	Seawall south of lighthouse, Jones Point Park, 1 Jones Point Drive, Alexandria	City of Alexandria, Virginia; Prince George's County, Maryland	38°47′25″N 77°02′26″W	Extant	1980

=== Southwestern side ===
Name	Image	Address	City/County	Coordinates	Status	Year Listed
Southwest No. 1 Boundary Marker of the Original District of Columbia	2012	1220 Wilkes Street	City of Alexandria, Virginia	38°48′04″N 77°03′16″W	Extant	1991
Southwest No. 2 Boundary Marker of the Original District of Columbia	2006	7 Russell Road. East side of Russell Road, north of intersection with King Street	City of Alexandria, Virginia	38°48′27″N 77°03′45″W	Replacement marker stone (Original stone missing)	1991
Southwest No. 3 Boundary Marker of the Original District of Columbia	2013	2952 King Street, in parking lot of First Baptist Church	City of Alexandria, Virginia	38°49′14″N 77°04′46″W	Extant	1991
Southwest No. 4 Boundary Marker of the Original District of Columbia	2006	King Street north of intersection with Wakefield Street	City of Alexandria and Arlington County, Virginia	38°49′54″N 77°05′35″W	Extant	1991
Southwest No. 5 Boundary Marker of the Original District of Columbia	2006	Northeast of intersection of King Street and Walter Reed Drive	Arlington County, Virginia	38°50′31″N 77°06′24″W	Extant	1991
Southwest No. 6 Boundary Marker of the Original District of Columbia	2012	South Jefferson Street south of intersection with Columbia Pike, in median strip	Arlington and Fairfax Counties, Virginia	38°51′07″N 77°07′09″W	Extant	1991
Southwest No. 7 Boundary Marker of the Original District of Columbia	2012	Behind 3101 South Manchester Street, Arlington, Virginia, in fence southwest of Carlin Springs Elementary School (5995 5th Road South, Arlington, Virginia) parking lot	Arlington and Fairfax Counties, Virginia	38°51′45″N 77°07′58″W	Extant	1991
Southwest No. 8 Boundary Marker of the Original District of Columbia	2012	South of intersection of Wilson Boulevard and John Marshall Drive, near parking lot behind apartment building and 100 feet (30.5 m) south of water tower	Arlington County and the City of Falls Church, Virginia	38°52′22″N 77°08′45″W	Extant	1991
Benjamin Banneker: SW-9 Intermediate Boundary Stone	2012	West side of Benjamin Banneker Park, 1701 North Van Buren Street, Falls Church, Virginia, between 18th Street North and Four Mile Run	Arlington County and the City of Falls Church, Virginia	38°52′59″N 77°09′33″W	Extant	1976

=== Western corner ===
Name	Image	Address	City/County	Coordinates	Status	Year Listed
West Cornerstone	2005	In Andrew Ellicott Park at the West Cornerstone, 2824 N. Arizona Street, Arlington, Virginia	Arlington County, City of Falls Church, and Fairfax County, Virginia	38°53′36″N 77°10′20″W	Extant	1991

=== Northwestern side ===
Name	Image	Address	City/County	Coordinates	Status	Year Listed
Northwest No. 1 Boundary Marker of the Original District of Columbia	2006	3607 North Powhatan Street, Arlington, Virginia	Arlington and Fairfax counties, Virginia	38°54′13″N 77°09′33″W	Extant	1991
Northwest No. 2 Boundary Marker of the Original District of Columbia	2005	5145 38th Street North, Arlington, Virginia	Arlington and Fairfax counties, Virginia	38°54′50″N 77°08′46″W	Extant	1991
Northwest No. 3 Boundary Marker of the Original District of Columbia	2013	4013 North Tazewell Street, Arlington, Virginia	Arlington and Fairfax counties, Virginia	38°55′29″N 77°07′56″W	Extant	1991
Northwest No. 4 Boundary Marker of the Original District of Columbia	2006	Dalecarlia Water Treatment Plant grounds, 100+ feet east of the Capital Crescent Trail and several hundred feet north of the intersection of Norton Street and Potomac Avenue	Washington, D.C., and Montgomery County, Maryland	38°56′15″N 77°06′56″W	Extant	1996
Northwest No. 5 Boundary Marker of the Original District of Columbia	2006	Dalecarlia Reservoir, 600 feet (180 m) west of Dalecarlia Parkway and 300 feet (91 m) southeast of concrete culvert	Washington, D.C., and Montgomery County, Maryland	38°56′41″N 77°06′24″W	Extant	1996
Northwest No. 6 Boundary Marker of the Original District of Columbia	2006	150 feet (46 m) northeast of intersection of Park and Western Avenues, Northwest	Washington, D.C., and Montgomery County, Maryland	38°57′18″N 77°05′37″W	Extant	1996
Northwest No. 7 Boundary Marker of the Original District of Columbia	2006	5600 Western Avenue	Washington, D.C., and Montgomery County, Maryland	38°57′55″N 77°04′50″W	Extant	1996
Northwest No. 8 Boundary Marker of the Original District of Columbia	2005	6422 Western Avenue	Washington, D.C., and Montgomery County, Maryland	38°58′32″N 77°04′02″W	Extant	1996
Northwest No. 9 Boundary Marker of the Original District of Columbia	2021	Rock Creek Park, about 165 feet (50 m) northwest of the centerline of Daniel Road and 5 feet (1.5 m) southeast from edge of 2701 Daniel Road	Washington, D.C., and Montgomery County, Maryland	38°59′09″N 77°03′15″W	Extant	1996

=== Northern corner ===
Name	Image	Address	City/County	Coordinates	Status	Year Listed
North Corner Boundary Marker of the Original District of Columbia	2014	1880 block of East-West Highway (south side)	Washington, D.C., and Montgomery County, Maryland	38°59′45″N 77°02′28″W	Extant	1996

=== Northeastern side ===
Name	Image	Address	City/County	Coordinates	Status	Year Listed
Northeast No. 1 Boundary Marker of the Original District of Columbia	2005	7847 Eastern Ave, Silver Spring, MD 20910	Washington, D.C., and Montgomery County, Maryland	38°59′08″N 77°01′40″W	Plaque in sidewalk (marker stone missing)	
Northeast No. 2 Boundary Marker of the Original District of Columbia	2005	6980 Maple Avenue, Takoma Park, Maryland	Washington, D.C., and Montgomery County, Maryland	38°58′31″N 77°00′53″W	Extant	1996
Northeast No. 3 Boundary Marker of the Original District of Columbia	2013	6201 Eastern Avenue, 110 feet (33.5 m) northwest of intersection with Chillum Road	Washington, D.C., and Prince George's County, Maryland	38°57′55″N 77°00′06″W	Extant	1996
Northeast No. 4 Boundary Marker of the Original District of Columbia	2006	5101 Eastern Avenue/5400 Sargent Road	Washington, D.C., and Prince George's County, Maryland	38°57′17″N 76°59′18″W	Extant	1996
Northeast No. 5 Boundary Marker of the Original District of Columbia	2006	4609 Eastern Avenue	Washington, D.C., and Prince George's County, Maryland	38°56′40″N 76°58′30″W	Extant	1996
Northeast No. 6 Boundary Marker of the Original District of Columbia	2005	3601 Eastern Avenue	Washington, D.C., and Prince George's County, Maryland	38°56′01″N 76°57′41″W	Extant	1996
Northeast No. 7 Boundary Marker of the Original District of Columbia	2013	Fort Lincoln Cemetery, along fence, 75 feet southwest of Garden Mausoleum	Washington, D.C., and Prince	38°55′26″N 76°56′55″W	Extant	1996
Northeast No. 8 Boundary Marker of the Original District of Columbia	2005	Kenilworth Park and Aquatic Gardens, along a fence 500 feet northwest of the intersection of Eastern and Kenilworth Avenues	Washington, D.C., and Prince George's County, Maryland	38°54′49″N 76°56′08″W	Extant	1996
Northeast No. 9 Boundary Marker of the Original District of Columbia	2005	919 Eastern Avenue	Washington, D.C., and Prince George's County, Maryland	38°54′11″N 76°55′20″W	Extant	1996

=== Eastern corner ===
Name	Image	Address	City/County	Coordinates	Status	Year Listed
East Corner Boundary Marker of the Original District of Columbia	2005	100 feet (30 m) east of intersection of Eastern and Southern Avenues	Washington, D.C., and Prince George's County, Maryland	38°53′34″N 76°54′33″W	Extant	1996

=== Southeastern side ===
Name	Image	Address	City/County	Coordinates	Status	Year Listed
Southeast No. 1 Boundary Marker of the Original District of Columbia	2005	30 feet (9.1 m) south of intersection of Southern Avenue and D Street	Washington, D.C., and Prince George's County, Maryland	38°52′58″N 76°55′20″W	Extant	1996
Southeast No. 2 Boundary Marker of the Original District of Columbia	2011	4345 Southern Avenue	Washington, D.C., and Prince George's County, Maryland	38°52′21″N 76°56′08″W	Extant	1996
Southeast No. 3 Boundary Marker of the Original District of Columbia	2011	3908 Southern Avenue	Washington, D.C., and Prince George's County, Maryland	38°51′44″N 76°56′55″W	Extant	1996
Southeast No. 4 Boundary Marker of the Original District of Columbia	1906	3101 Southern Avenue, along gate in front of parking lot south of intersection with Naylor Road.	Washington, D.C., and Prince George's County, Maryland	38°51′06″N 76°57′43″W	Replacement marker stone (Original displayed off-site in 2016)	
Southeast No. 5 Boundary Marker of the Original District of Columbia	2011	280 feet (85 m) northeast of intersection of Southern Avenue and Valley Terrace, just outside Southern Avenue station	Washington, D.C., and Prince George's County, Maryland	38°50′30″N 76°58′29″W	Extant	1996
Southeast No. 6 Boundary Marker of the Original District of Columbia	2011	901 Southern Avenue	Washington, D.C., and Prince George's County, Maryland	38°49′53″N 76°59′17″W	Extant	1996
Southeast No. 7 Boundary Marker of the Original District of Columbia	2011	25 feet (7.6 m) south of intersection of Southern Avenue and Indian Head Highway, on east side of Indian Head Highway	Washington, D.C., and Prince George's County, Maryland	38°49′16″N 77°00′04″W	Extant	1996
Southeast No. 8 Boundary Marker of the Original District of Columbia	1906	Behind Blue Plains Impoundment Lot: Southeast corner of lot on the Maryland side of the fence, a short distance from the lightposts.	Washington, D.C., and Prince George's County, Maryland	38°48′39″N 77°00′51″W	Replacement marker stone (Original missing)	
Southeast No. 9 Boundary Marker of the Original District of Columbia	1907	1,000 feet (300 m) southwest of the southern end of Oxon Cove Bridge and about 200 feet (61 m) east of the Potomac River	Washington, D.C., and Prince George's County, Maryland	38°48′13″N 77°01′25″W	Extant	1996

== Plaques ==
Explanatory plaques that are not attached to fences accompany several boundary marker stones, including:

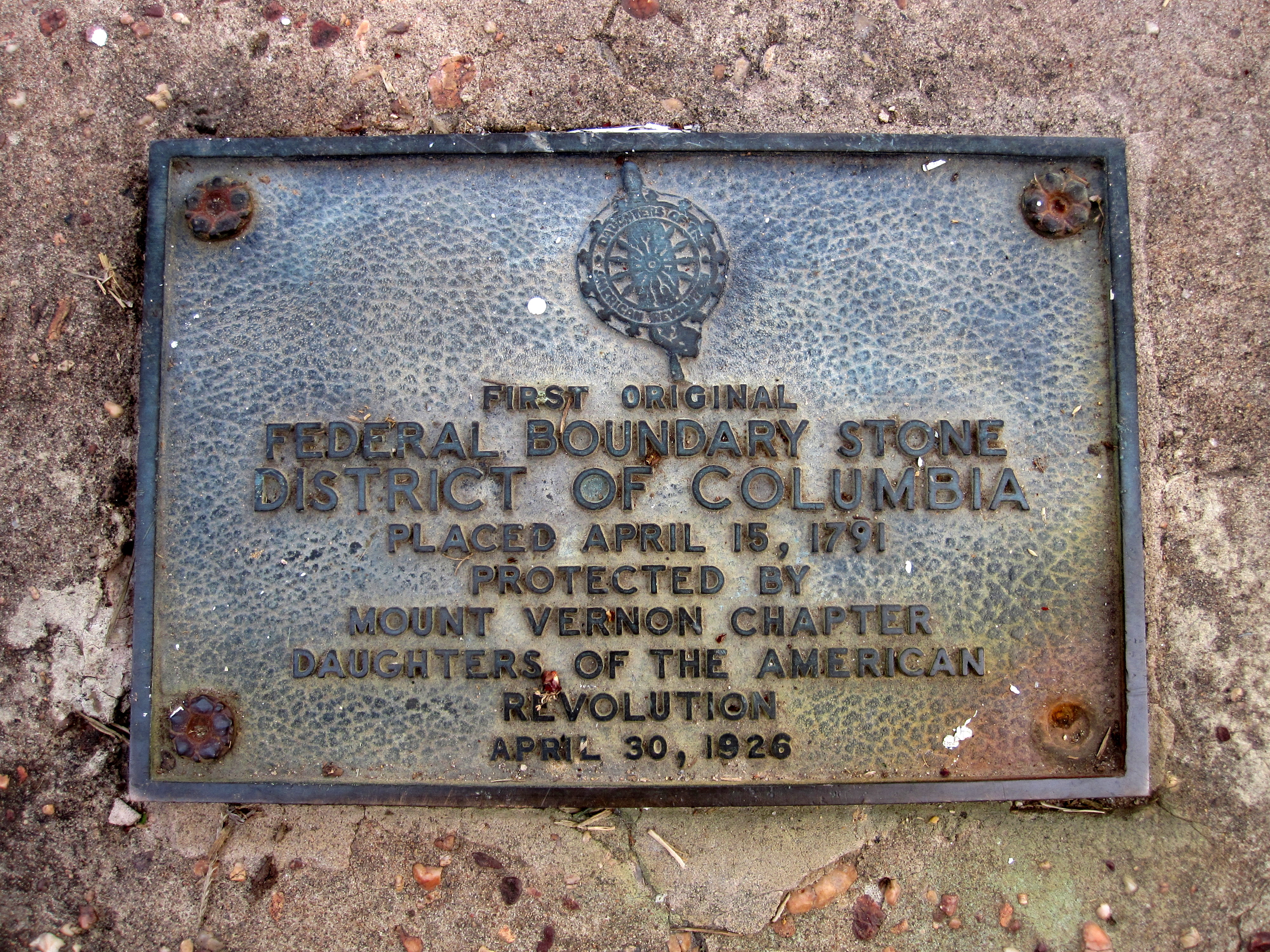
South cornerstone
(2010)

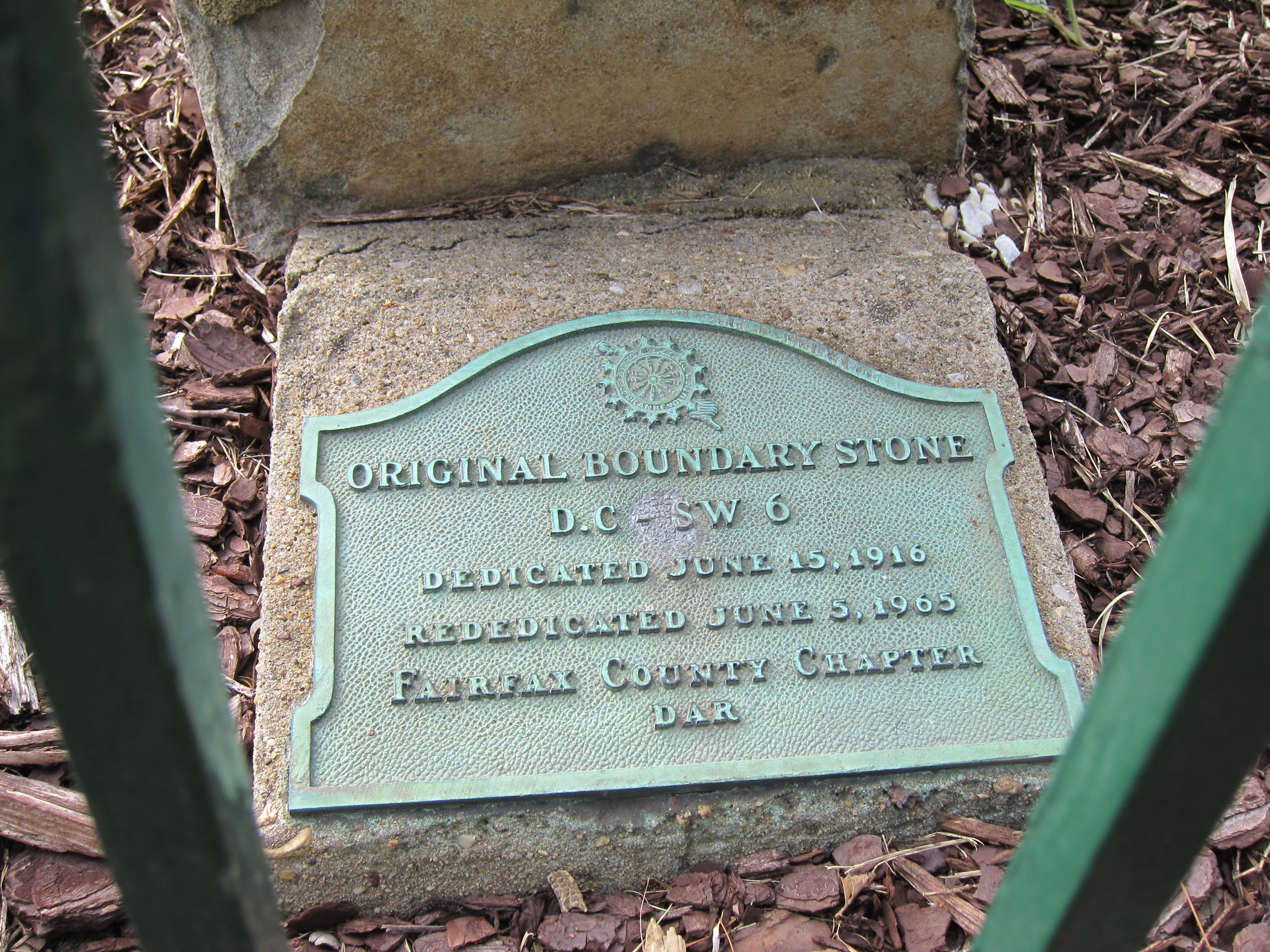
Southwest No. 6
(2012)

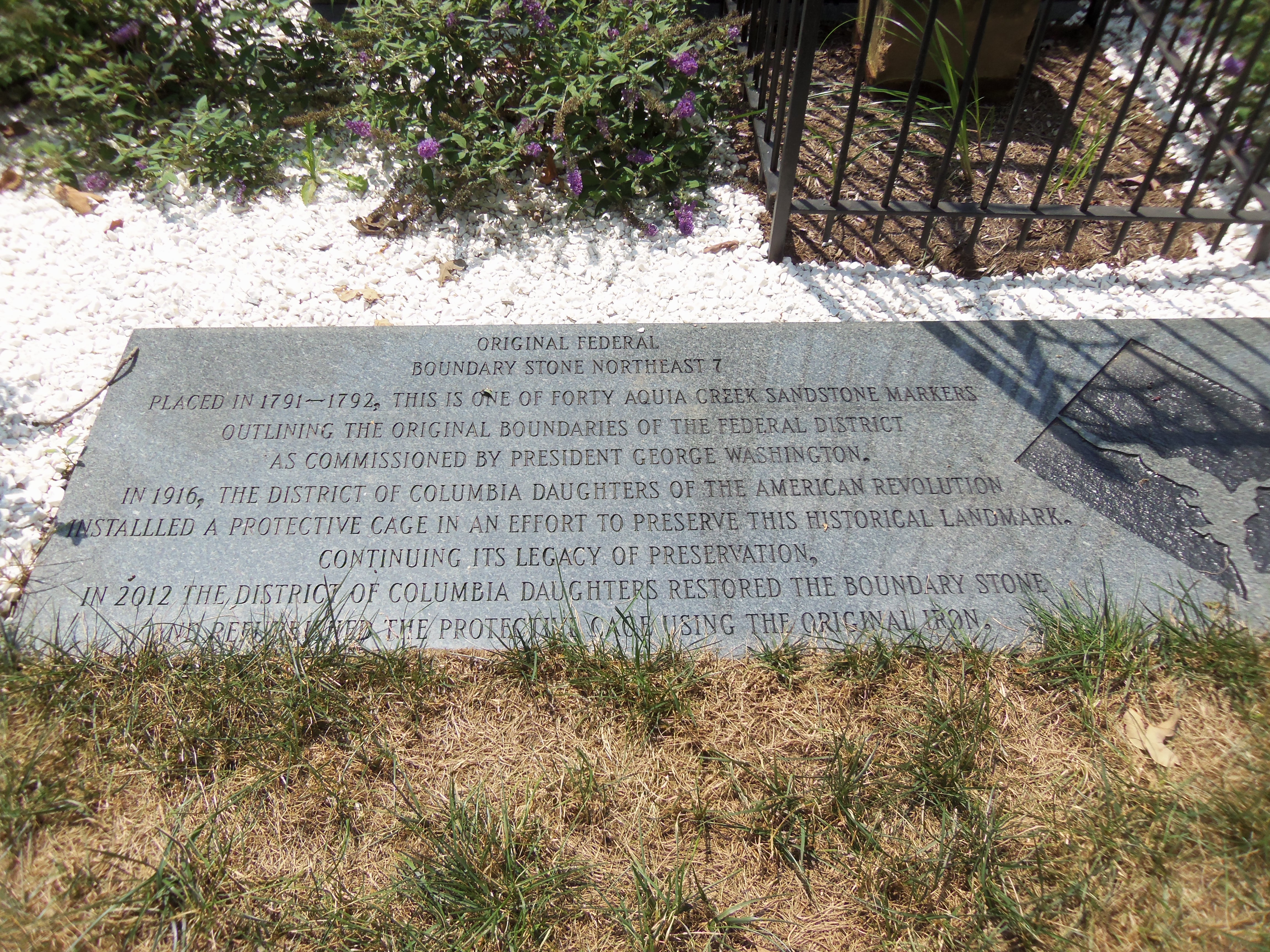
Northeast No. 7 preservation plaque
(2013)

== Historical markers ==
In 2005, the Arlington County, Virginia, government erected historical markers near the Southwest Nos. 6 and 8 boundary marker stones of the original District of Columbia.

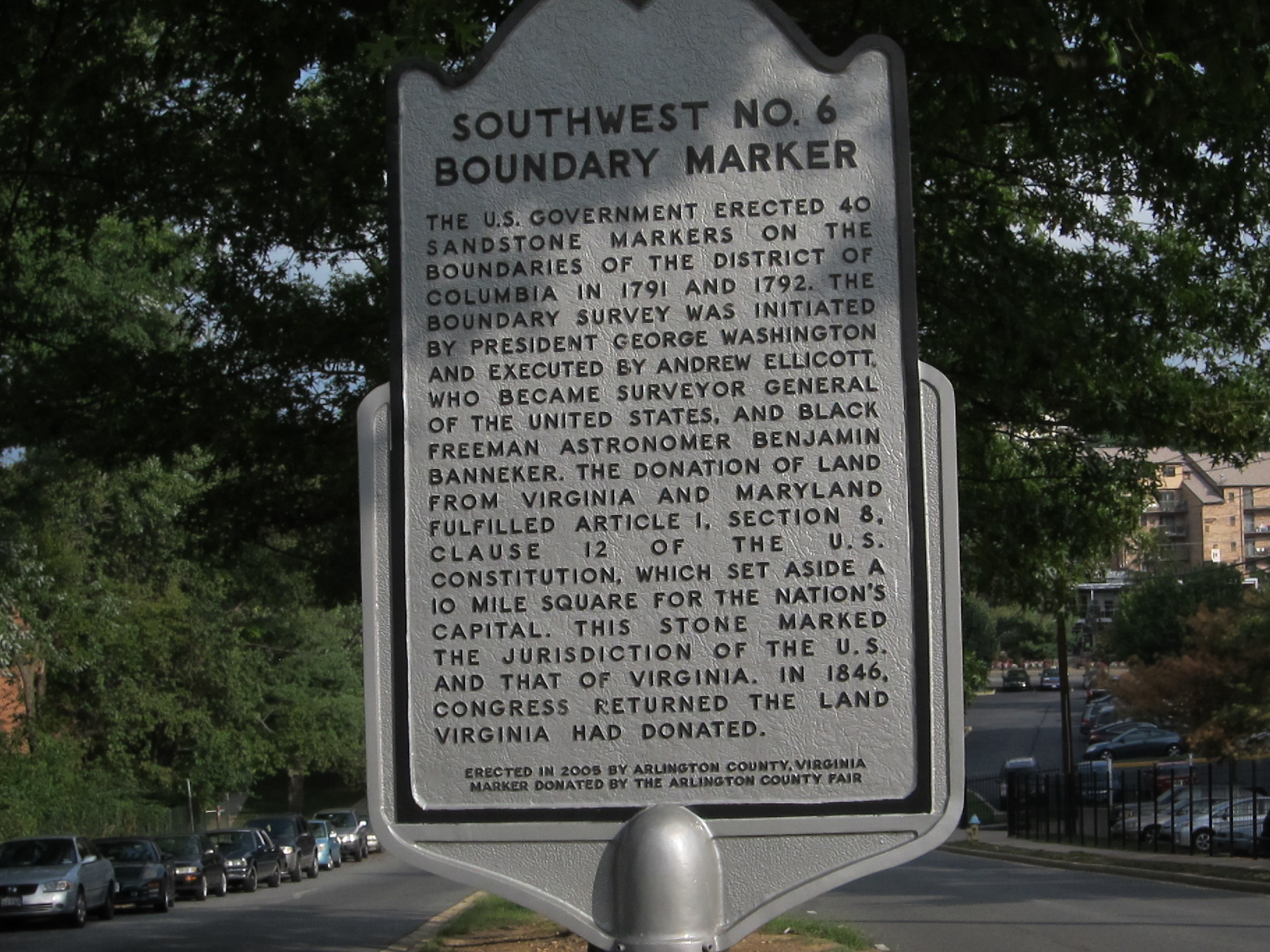
Southwest No. 6 historical marker
(2012)

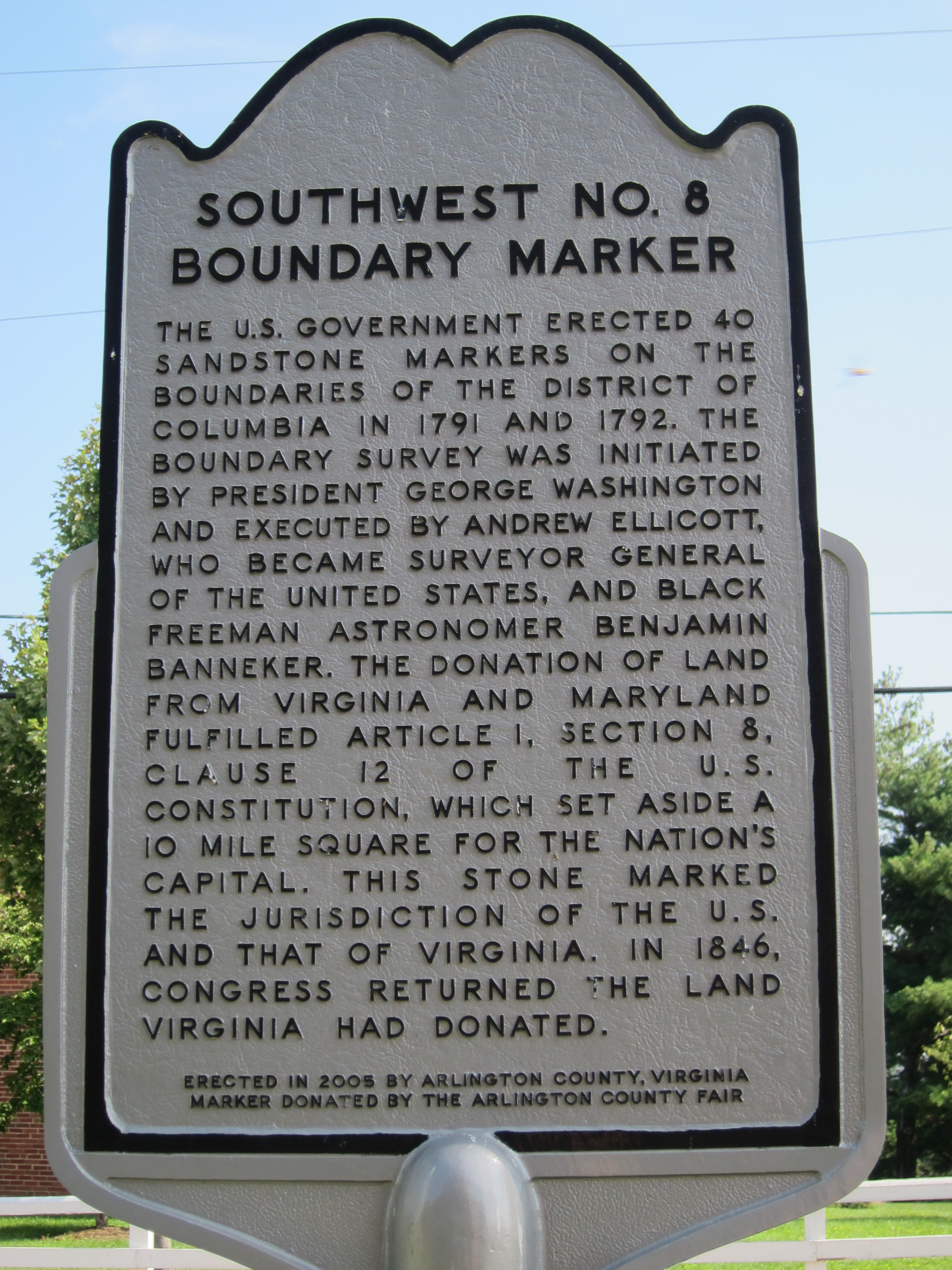
Southwest No. 8 historical marker
(2012)

== Missing boundary markers ==
Four of the forty original boundary markers were not in or near their original locations in late 2016. Three of these had been replaced with substitute markers.

Name	Image	Description
Southwest No. 2	2013	The original Southwest No. 2 marker disappeared before 1900. A marker stone now within a DAR fence near the street curb at 7 Russell Road north of King Street in Alexandria is a replacement about 0.35 miles (0.6 km) southeast of the original location. DAR records show that the replacement marker was placed at its current location in 1920. The replacement marker lacks an inscription and does not resemble an original boundary marker.
Northeast No. 1	June 13, 1916	A photograph taken on June 13, 1916, shows a ceremony that members of the DAR conducted when they unveiled a fence around Northeast No. 1, which was then in a field. The stone was accidentally bulldozed and removed in September 1952 during the construction of a storefront at 7847 Eastern Avenue, northwest of the avenue's intersection with Georgia Avenue. A bronze plaque in the sidewalk in front of a shop at the site marks the stone's former location.
Southeast No. 4		Southeast No. 4, described as an "indistinguishable nub", was located in 1976 along Southern Avenue a few feet southeast of the avenue's intersection with Naylor Road. When a truck knocked the stone out of place in 1985, the manager of a nearby apartment building moved it into the building's boiler room for safekeeping. In 1991, the building manager gave the stone to the bicentennial resurveying team. A team member then stored the stone in his garage. In 2012, the stone was transferred to the D.C. Office of the Surveyor, which intended to reset the stone near its original location. However, in 2016, a replica of the stone resembling the presumed appearance of the original stone when new was placed near the original stone's site. The original stone was placed on display in the Office of the Surveyor.
Southeast No. 8		The original Southeast No. 8 stone was removed in 1958 during construction and then either lost or stolen from a storage facility before it could be reset in the ground. In 1962, the DAR placed a new inscription-less stone in the same location along with the original stone's iron fence. However, further construction subsequently buried the replacement stone. The replacement stone was later discovered nearly eight feet below ground level in the southeast corner of the Blue Plains Impoundment Lot, on the Maryland side of the impoundment lot's fence. A concrete pipe embedded in a mound of gravel was put in place to mark the replacement stone's site. In 1972, the stone had been uncovered, and an excavation and relocation was planned, but never happened and the stone was again covered by landfill until 1991. A bicentennial resurveying team then dug it out of the ground, using old photographs to locate it. The stone was replaced underground for protection and covered by a taller pipe that was visible above the surface. In 2015, DDOT workers excavated and removed the stone after debris in the pipe had covered the stone. The stone was replaced in early 2016 with a replica that presumably had the same appearance as the original had when new. This replica was installed at ground level at the stone's original site.

== District of Columbia entrance markers ==
A group of entrance markers, erected later along major roads that travel into the District of Columbia, are located on or near the boundary of D.C. and Maryland. Three pairs of marker stones and another single stone are known collectively as the Garden Club of America Entrance Markers. They are all listed on the National Register of Historic Places.

- One pair of markers is located within Westmoreland Circle at the junction of Western Avenue and Massachusetts Avenue NW. These markers are between the Northwest No. 5 and Northwest No. 6 boundary markers of the original District of Columbia.
- Two similar markers flank Wisconsin Avenue at Western Avenue in Friendship Heights, near the Friendship Heights Metro Station.

These markers are between the Northwest No. 6 and Northwest No. 7 boundary markers of the original District of Columbia.

- Another pair of markers is located within Chevy Chase Circle, at the junction of Western Avenue and Connecticut Avenue. These markers are between the Northwest No. 7 and Northwest No. 8 boundary markers of the original District of Columbia.
- A single marker is located within a traffic island at the intersection of Georgia Avenue, Alaska Avenue and Kalmia Road NW. The marker is located inside the triangular island's southeast corner, near the intersection of Georgia Avenue to the east and Kalmia Road to the south.

The marker was formerly located inside a median in the center of Georgia Avenue, just north of the Avenue's intersection with Kalmia Road and Alaska Avenue. This marker is between the former site of the Northeast No. 1 and the present site of the Northeast No. 2 boundary markers of the original District of Columbia.

Another D.C. entrance marker stands in a traffic circle (Blair Circle) near downtown Silver Spring, Maryland, at the junction of Eastern Avenue NW, 16th Street NW, N. Portal Drive NW and Colesville Road. The marker is between the North Corner boundary marker and the former site of the Northeast No. 1 boundary marker of the original District of Columbia.

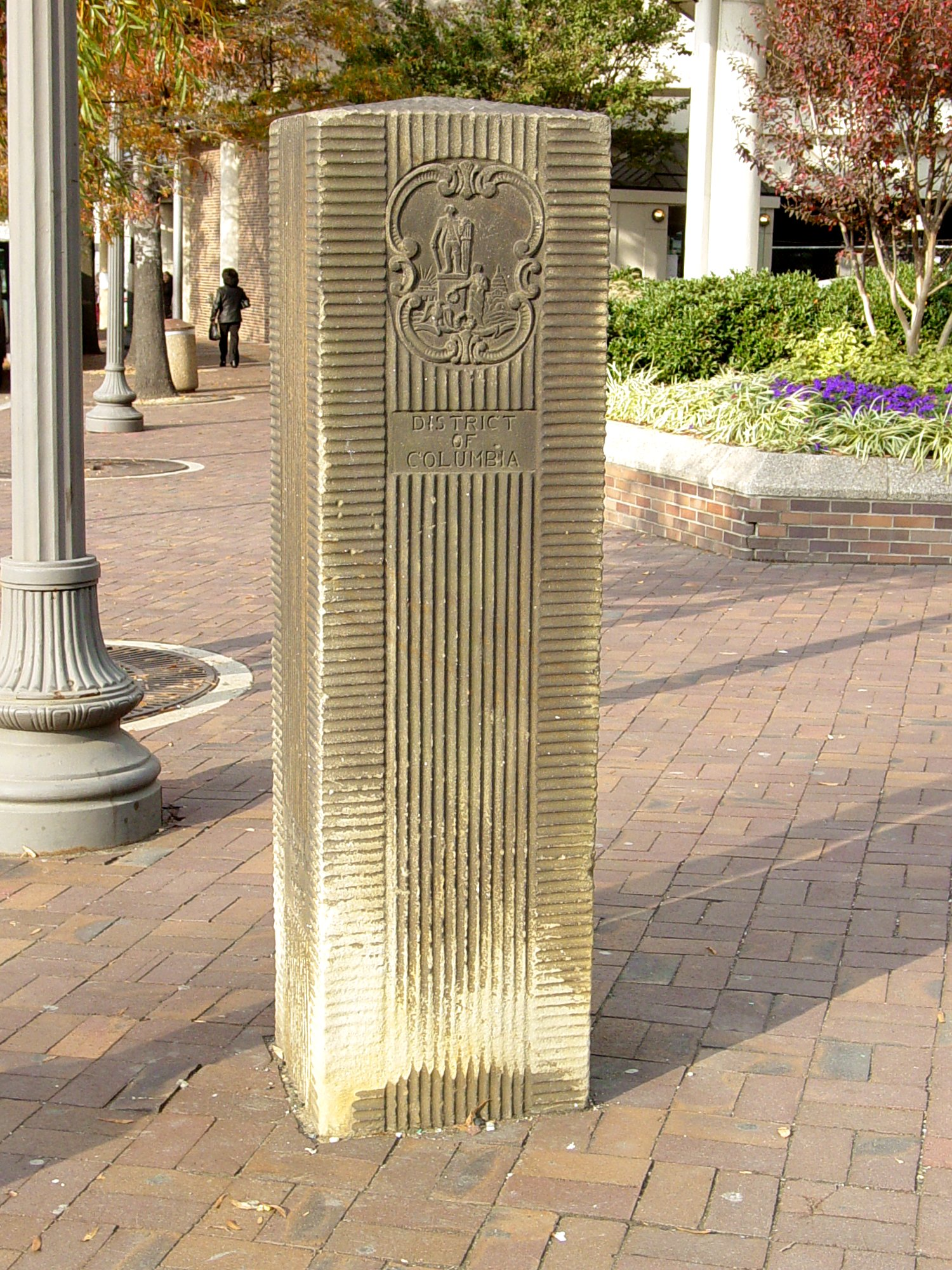
One of the Garden Club of America Entrance Markers in Friendship Heights (2005)

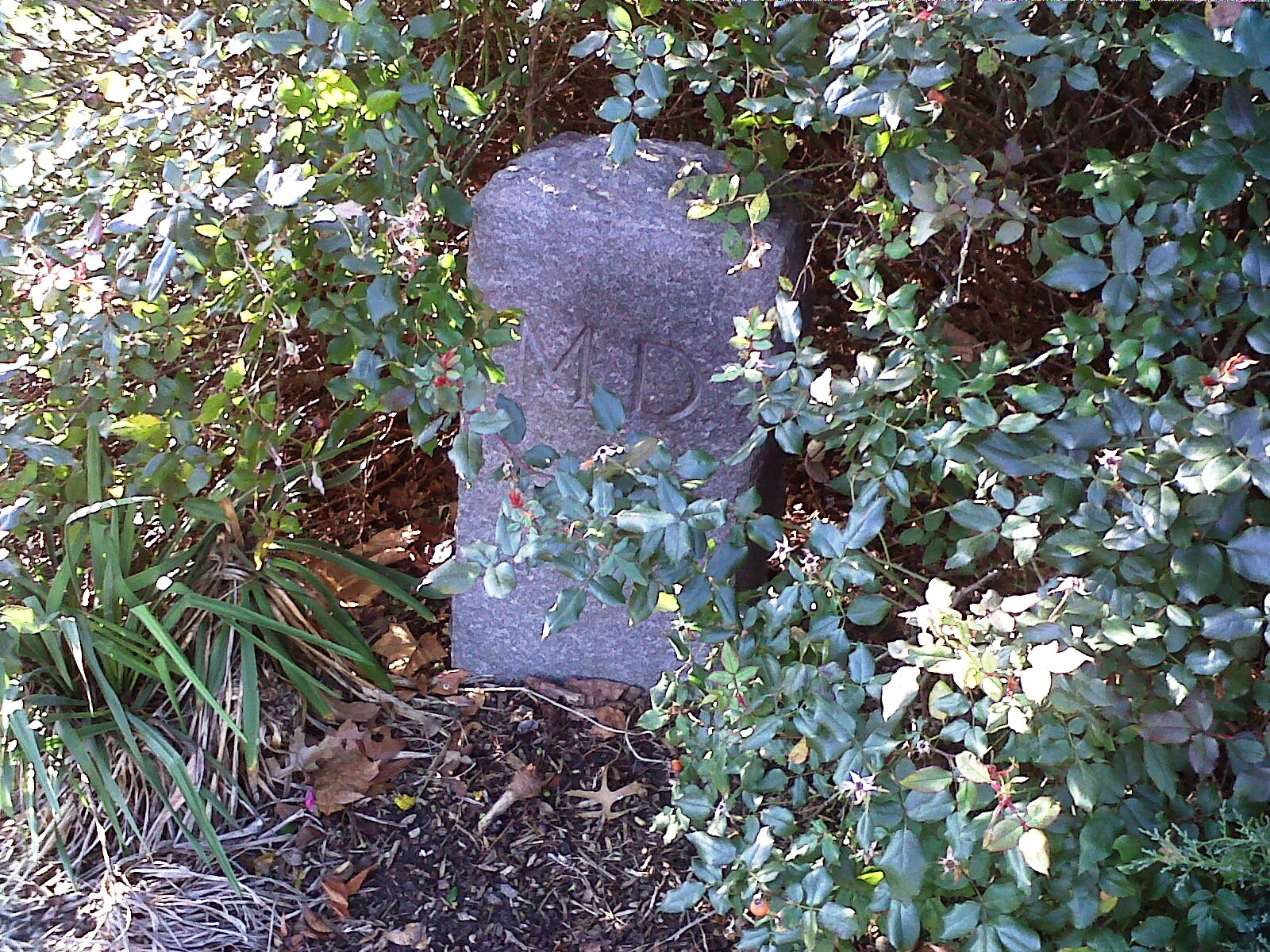
D.C. entrance marker in traffic circle near downtown Silver Spring (2011)

== See also ==
- History of Washington, D.C.
- Index of Washington, D.C.-related articles
- List of Registered Historic Places in the District of Columbia
- List of Registered Historic Places in Virginia
- Outline of Washington, D.C.
