= Jones Point Light =

Lighthouse in Virginia, United States

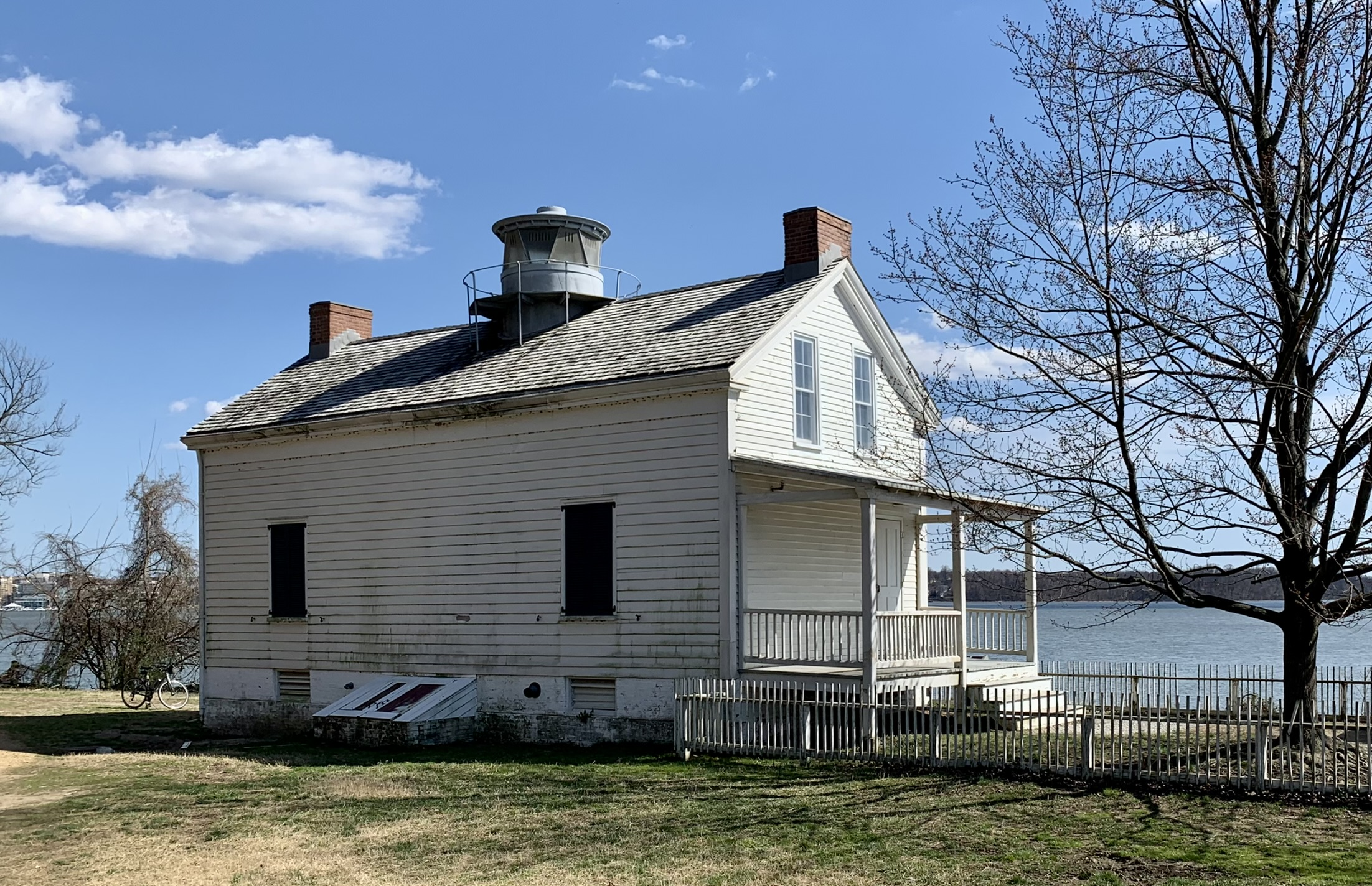
- Jones Point Light in 2022
- Location: Alexandria, Virginia
- Coordinates: 38°47′25.4″N 77°2′26.3″W

Tower
- Foundation: Natural / Emplaced
- Construction: Wood
- Automated: 1919
- Shape: Conical lantern on square house
- Heritage: National Register of Historic Places listed place, Virginia Historic Landmark

Light
- First lit: 1856
- Deactivated: 1926-1995
- Lens: Fifth order Fresnel lens
- Jones Point Lighthouse and District of Columbia South Cornerstone
- U.S. National Register of Historic Places
- Virginia Landmarks Register
- Location: Jones Point Park, Alexandria, Virginia
- Area: 1 acre (0.40 ha)
- Built: 1791
- Architectural style: Greek Revival
- NRHP reference No.: 80000352
- VLR No.: 100-0116

Significant dates
- Added to NRHP: May 19, 1980
- Designated VLR: March 18, 1980

The Jones Point Light is a small river lighthouse located on the Potomac River in Alexandria, Virginia. It was built in 1855.

== Lighthouse ==
It is a small, one-story house with a lantern on top and served primarily as a warning light for naval ships approaching the Washington Navy Yard. The lighthouse was discontinued in 1926, replaced by a small steel skeletal tower located nearby; this smaller tower was in use for ten years before being discontinued. After being dark for more than half a century, Jones Point Light was relit by a private concern in 1995, however, it was eventually put out again after ownership switched from the Daughters of the American Revolution Foundation to the National Park Service. Certain local efforts have called for the structure to be relit, but as of 2017, the only working lighthouse on the Potomac River is the Fort Washington Point Lighthouse, located five miles downriver.

The lighthouse is located on Jones Point in Alexandria, and is part of Jones Point Park. Visitors can approach the lighthouse, but it is currently impossible to enter the building.

The lighthouse is immediately north of the confluence of Hunting Creek and the Potomac River. The 1791-1792 survey of the boundaries of the District of Columbia began at a spot that was then at the tip of a cape at the Point. The south cornerstone from the boundary survey remains in the seawall adjacent to the lighthouse.

In 1980, the lighthouse and the cornerstone were listed in the National Register of Historic Places as reference #80000352. The lighthouse is also listed in the Library of Congress Historic American Buildings Survey as survey number VA-641. The listing shows lighthouse drawings and several black-and-white photos of the lighthouse prior to restoration.

== Gallery ==
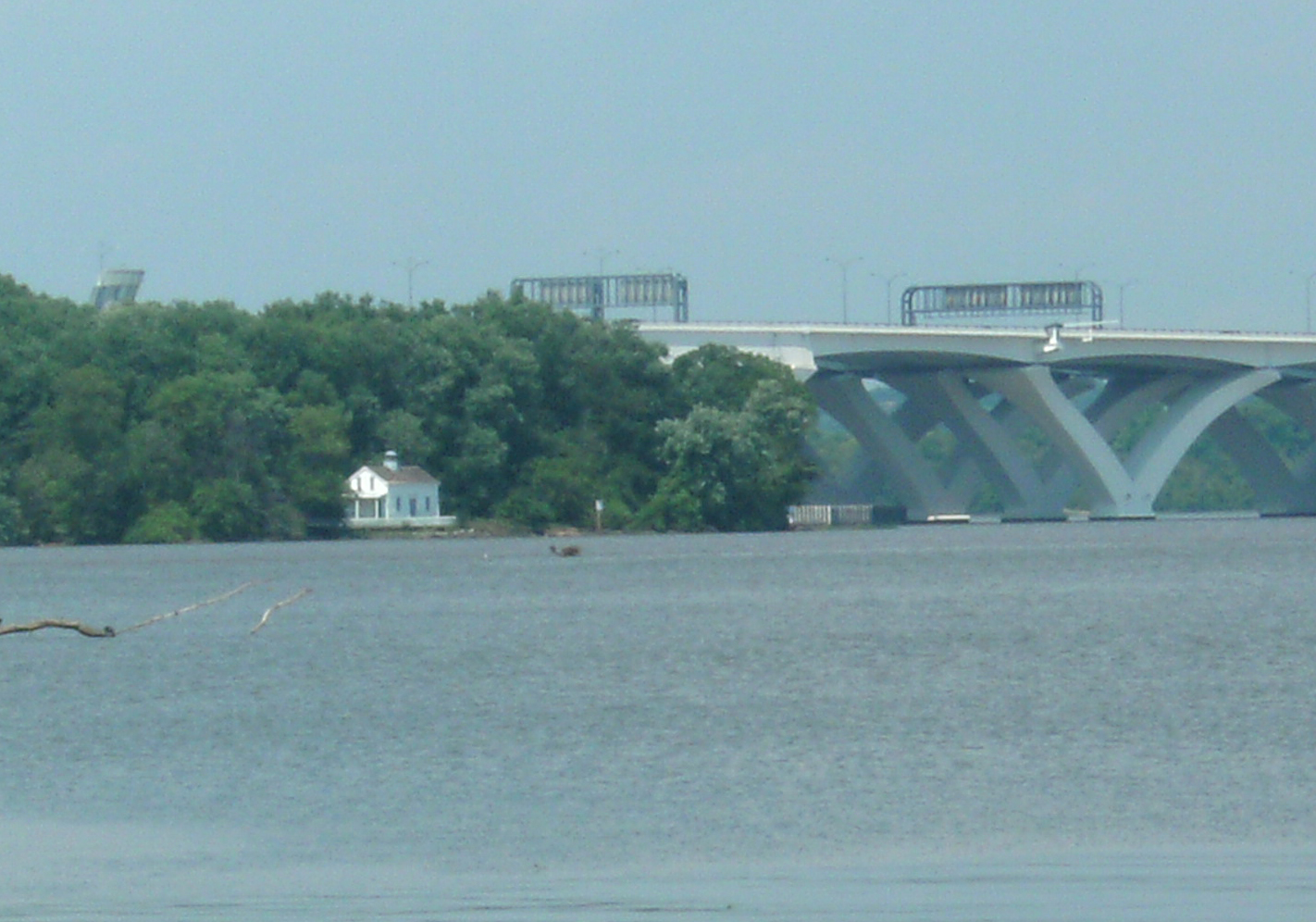
The lighthouse and the Woodrow Wilson Bridge, seen from the bank of the Potomac River at Belle Haven

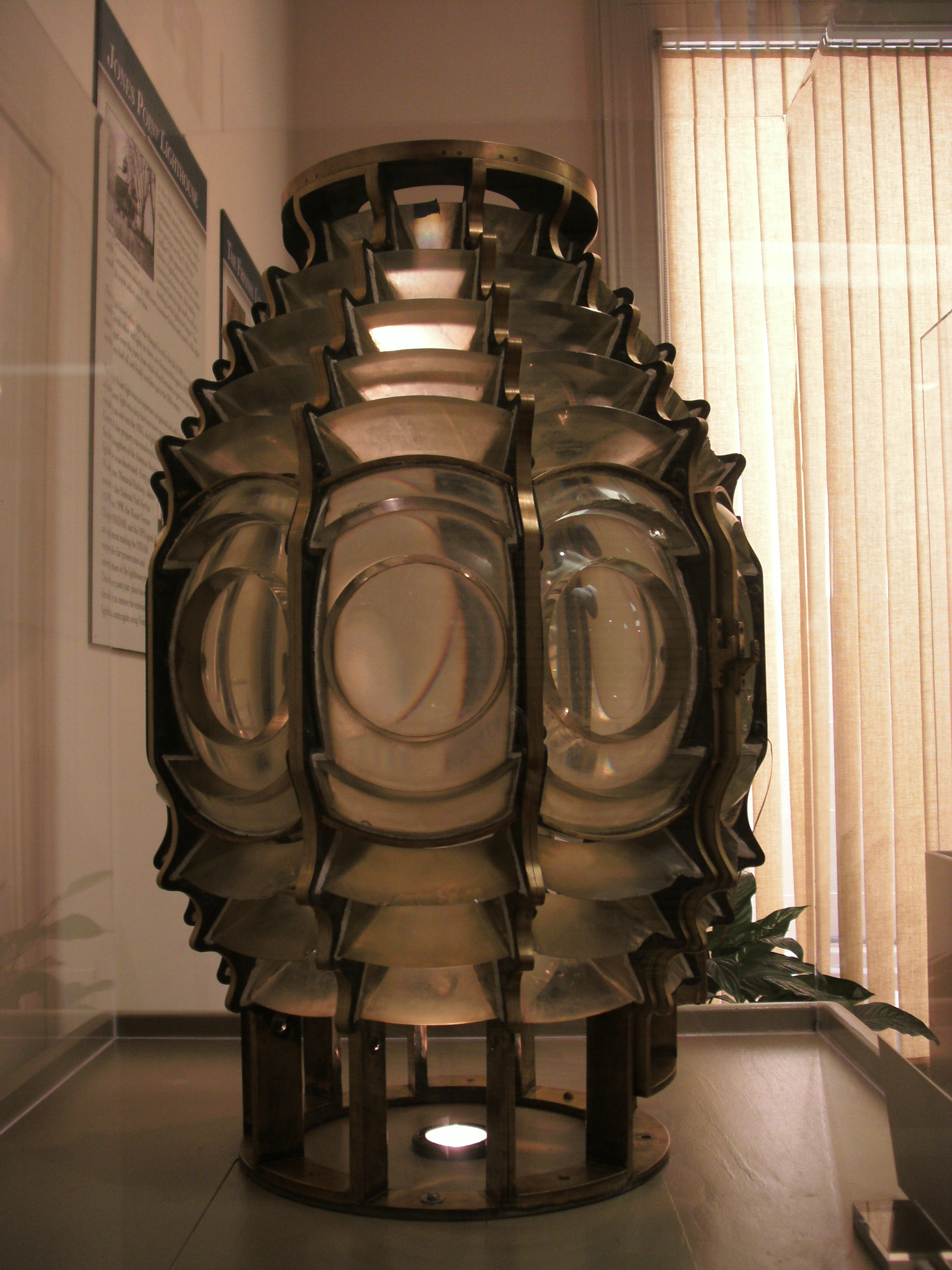
Fifth-order Fresnel lens once used at the lighthouse, on display at The Lyceum, Alexandria's history museum

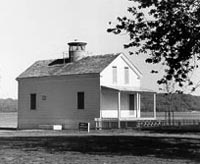
Jones Point Lighthouse in 1996

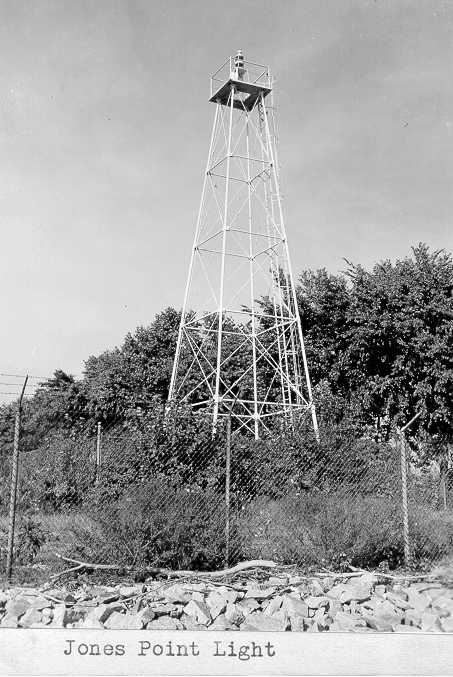
Skeleton tower at the point, which replaced the earlier structure

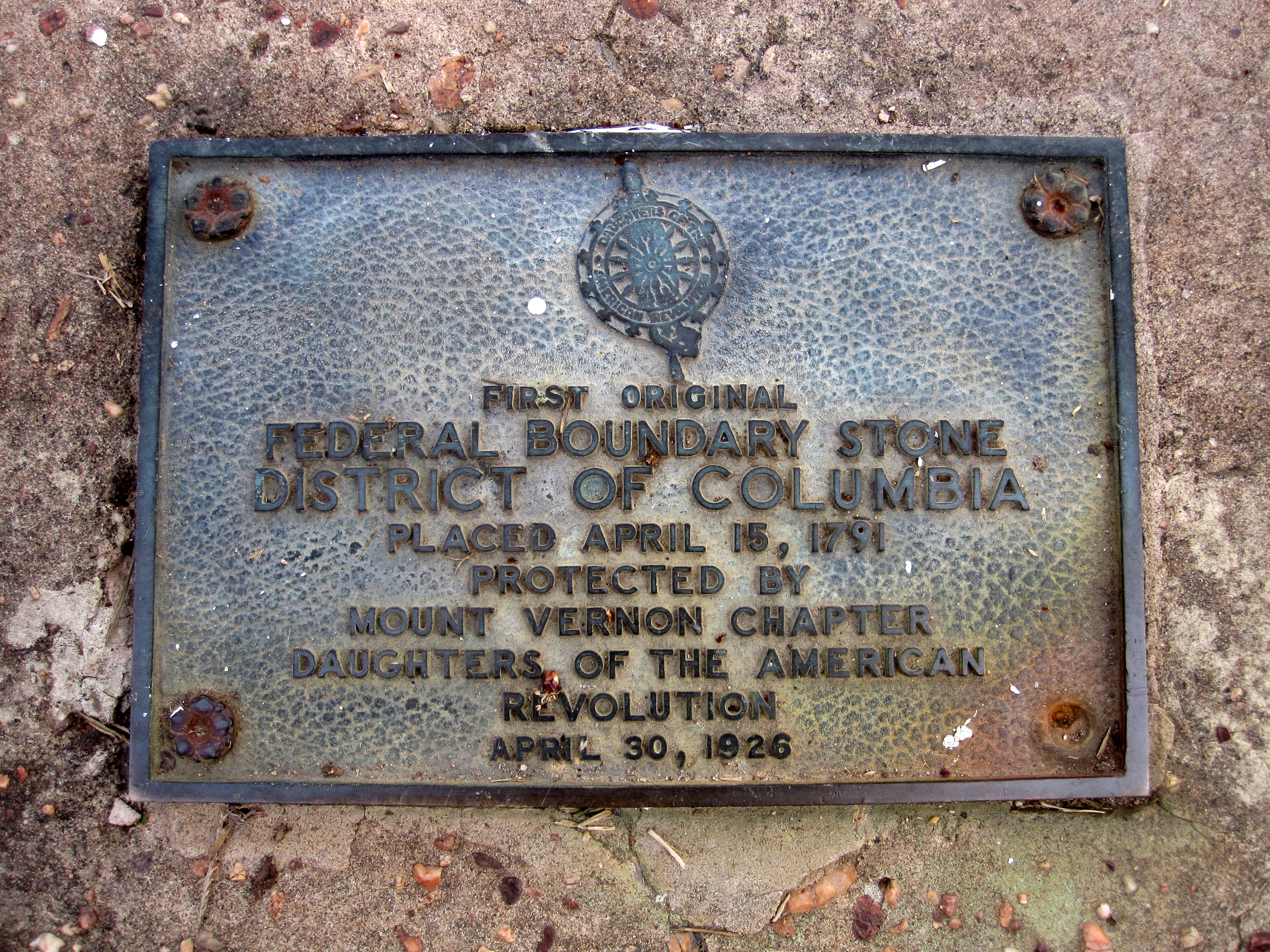
Plaque placed in the sea wall next marking the south cornerstone.

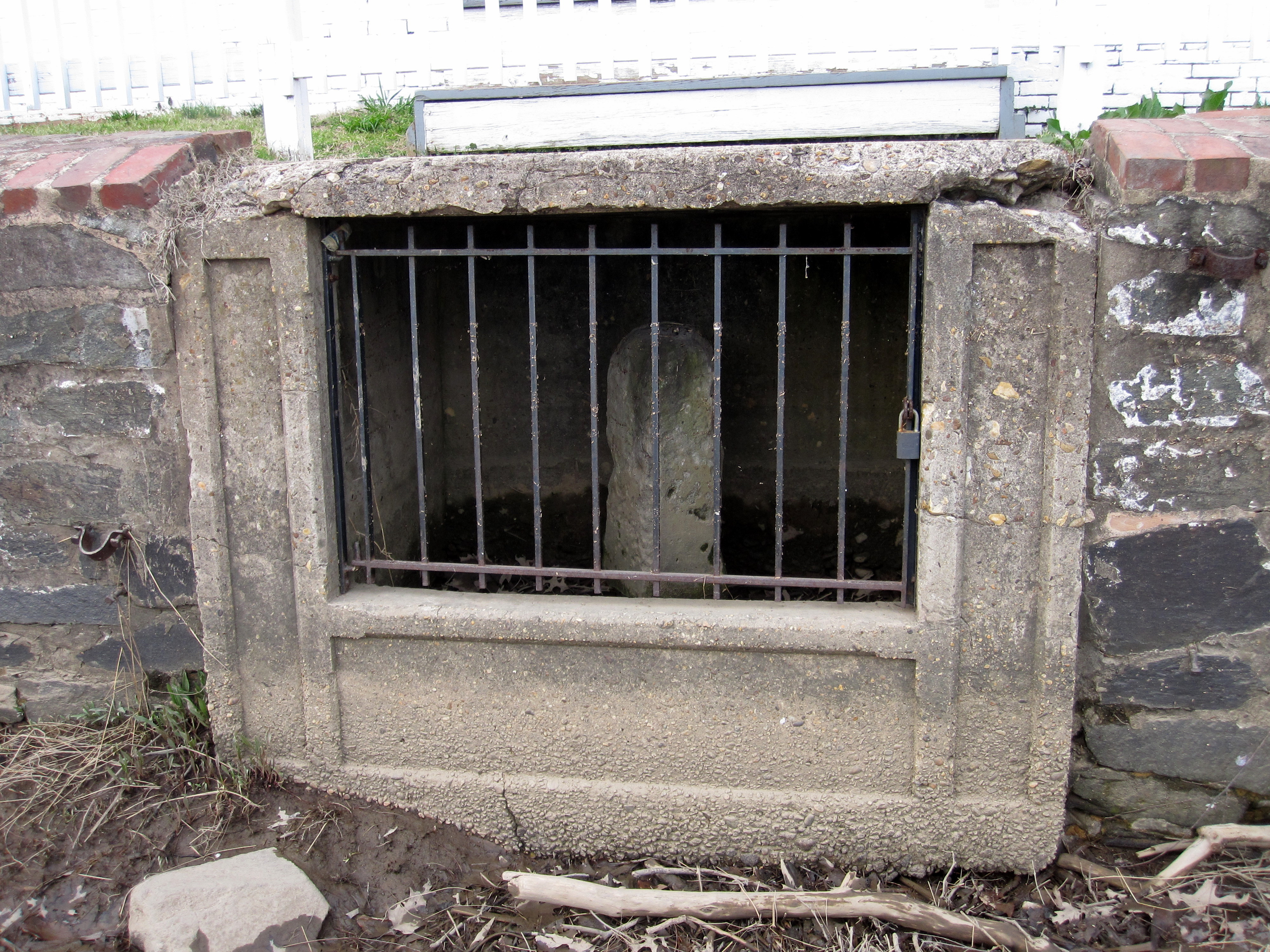
The boundary cornerstone is located in the lighthouse's sea wall.

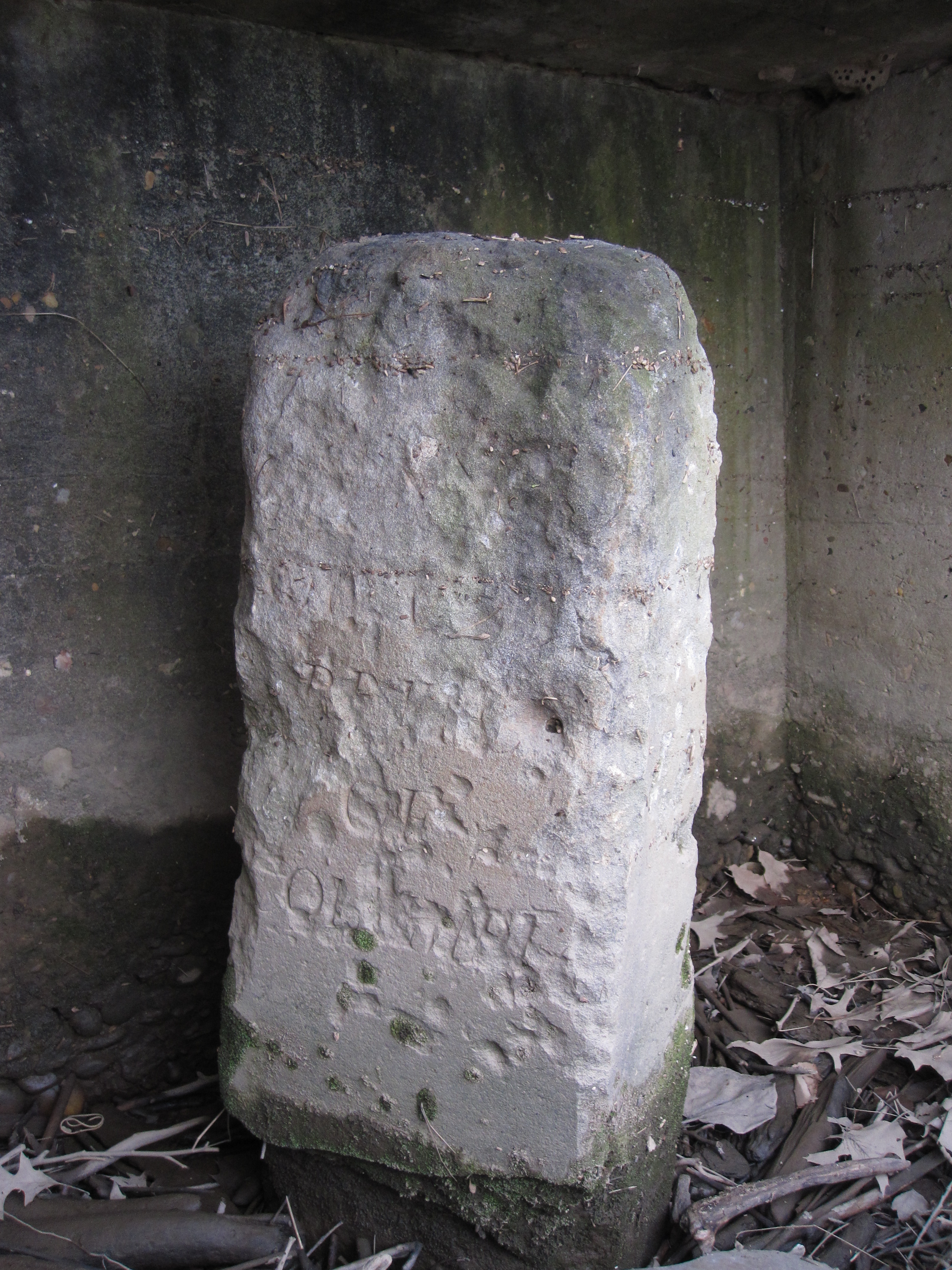
A close-up of the cornerstone.

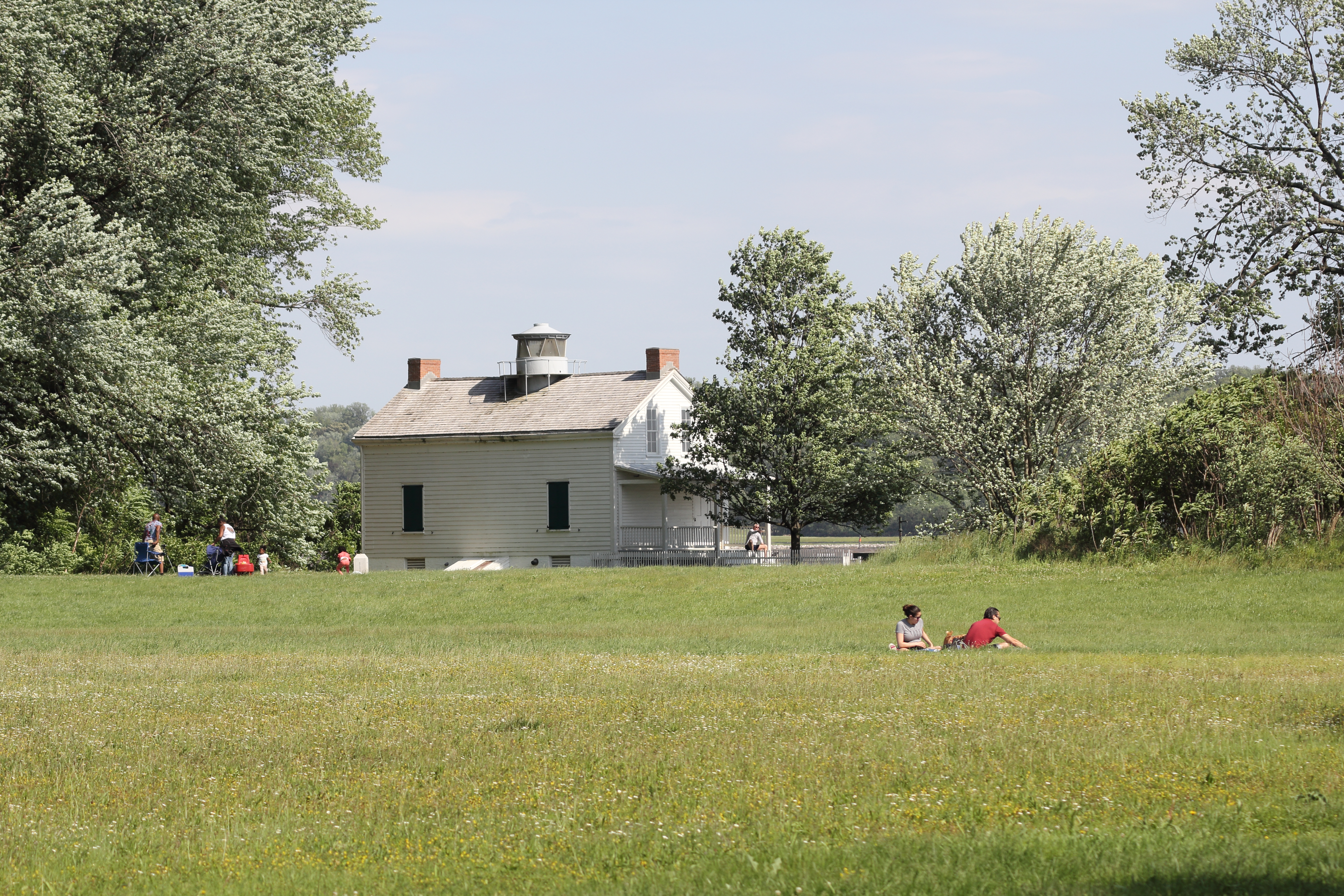
Jones Point Light, Jones Point, Alexandria, Virginia, in the spring of 2017

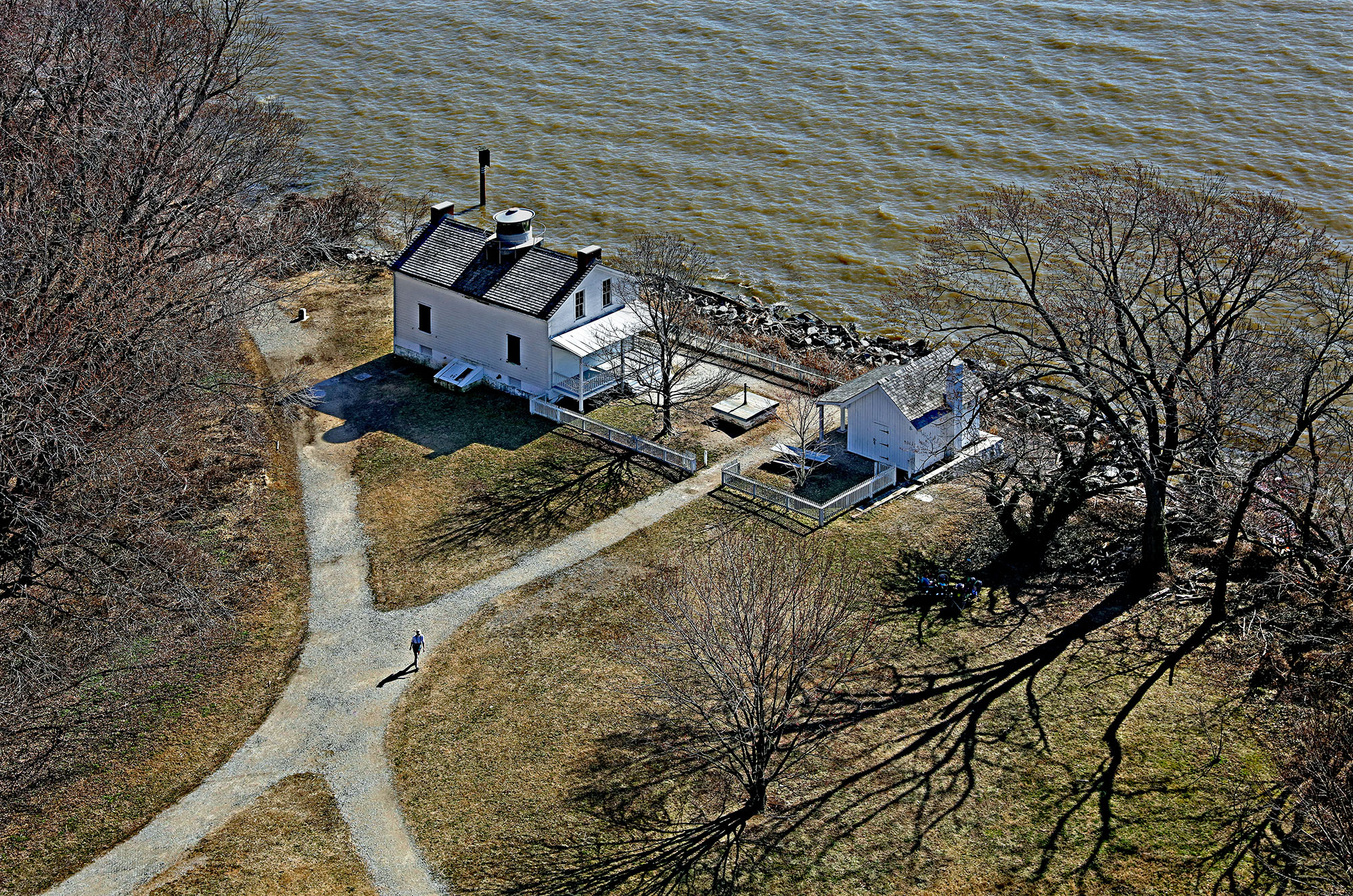
Jones Point Lighthouse, Looking Southeast
