= Jones Point (Virginia) =

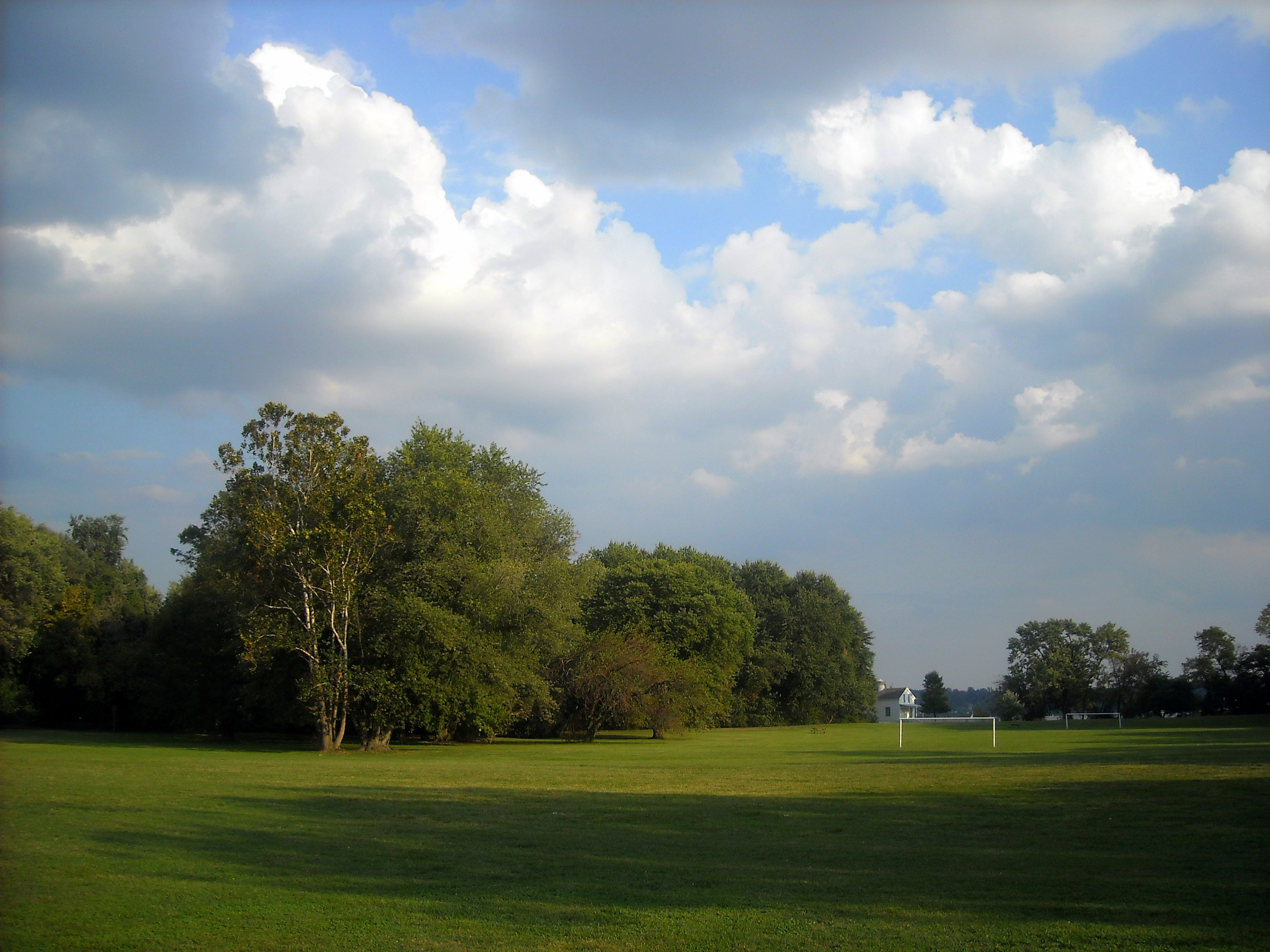
- The park on Jones Point

- Location within Alexandria
- Location: Alexandria, Virginia
- Coordinates: 38°47′29″N 77°02′27″W
- Website: www.nps.gov/gwmp/planyourvisit/jonespoint.htm

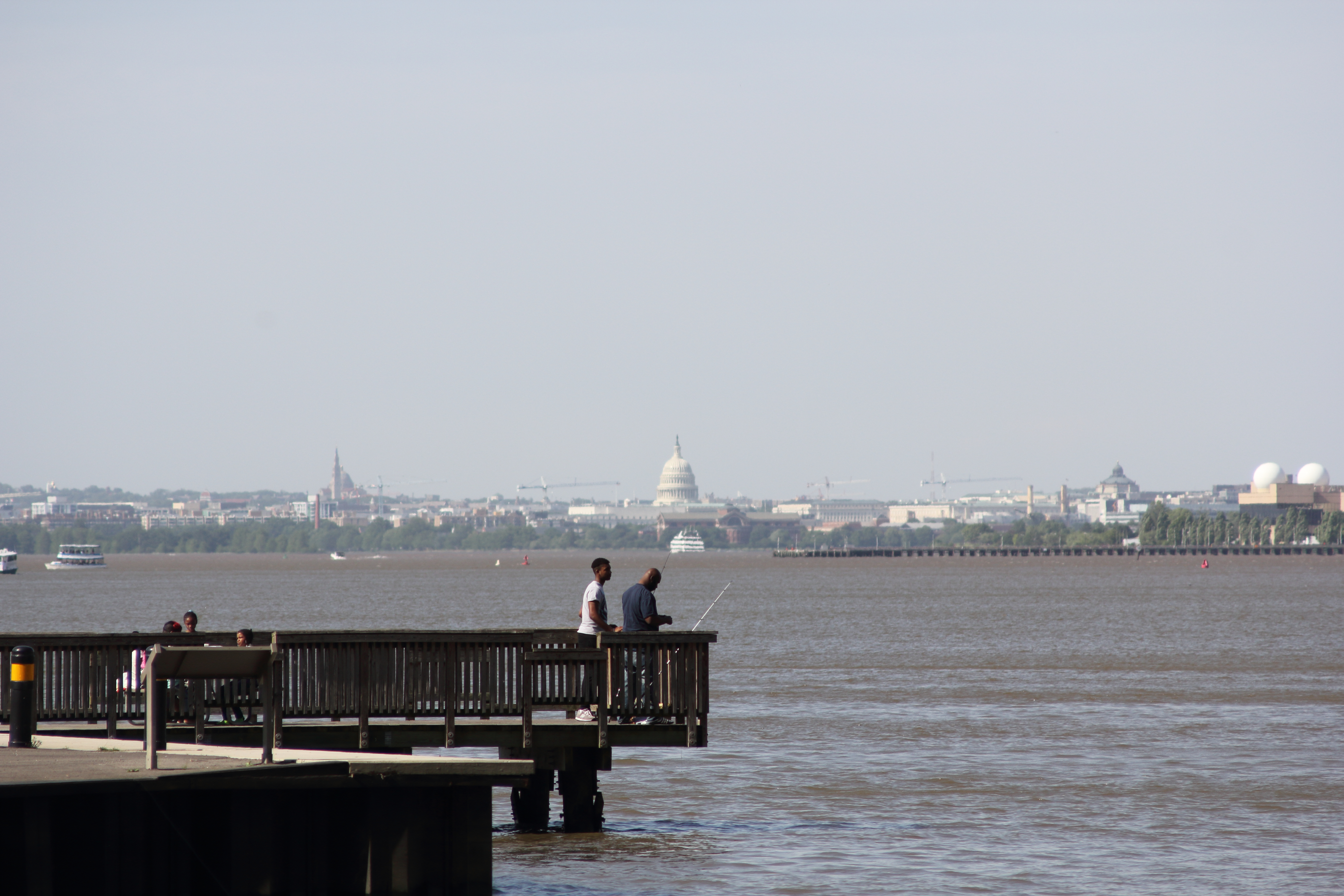
Fishermen at Jones Point, Alexandria, Virginia, with the United States Capitol in the background

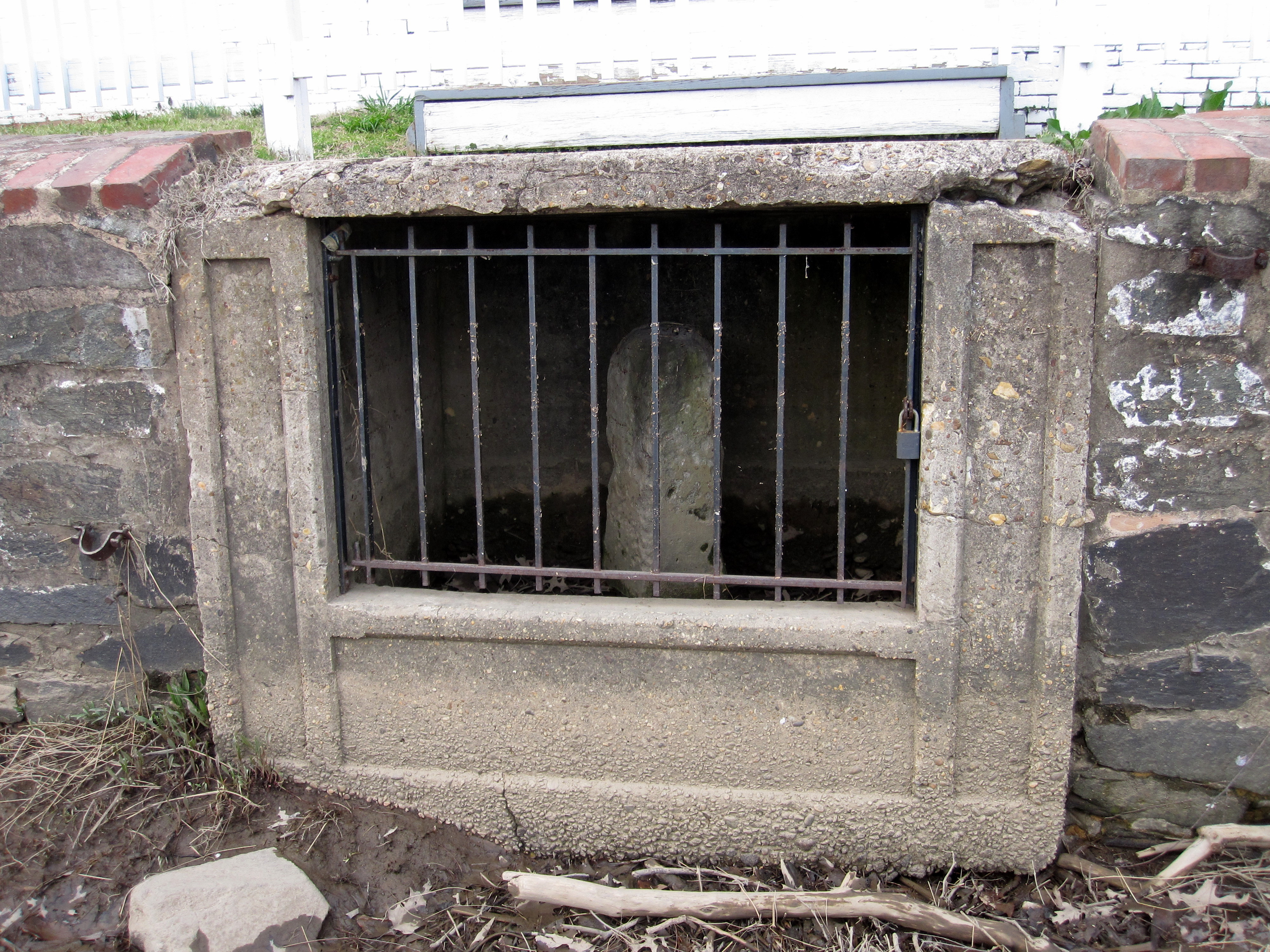
South cornerstone in seawall at Jones Point

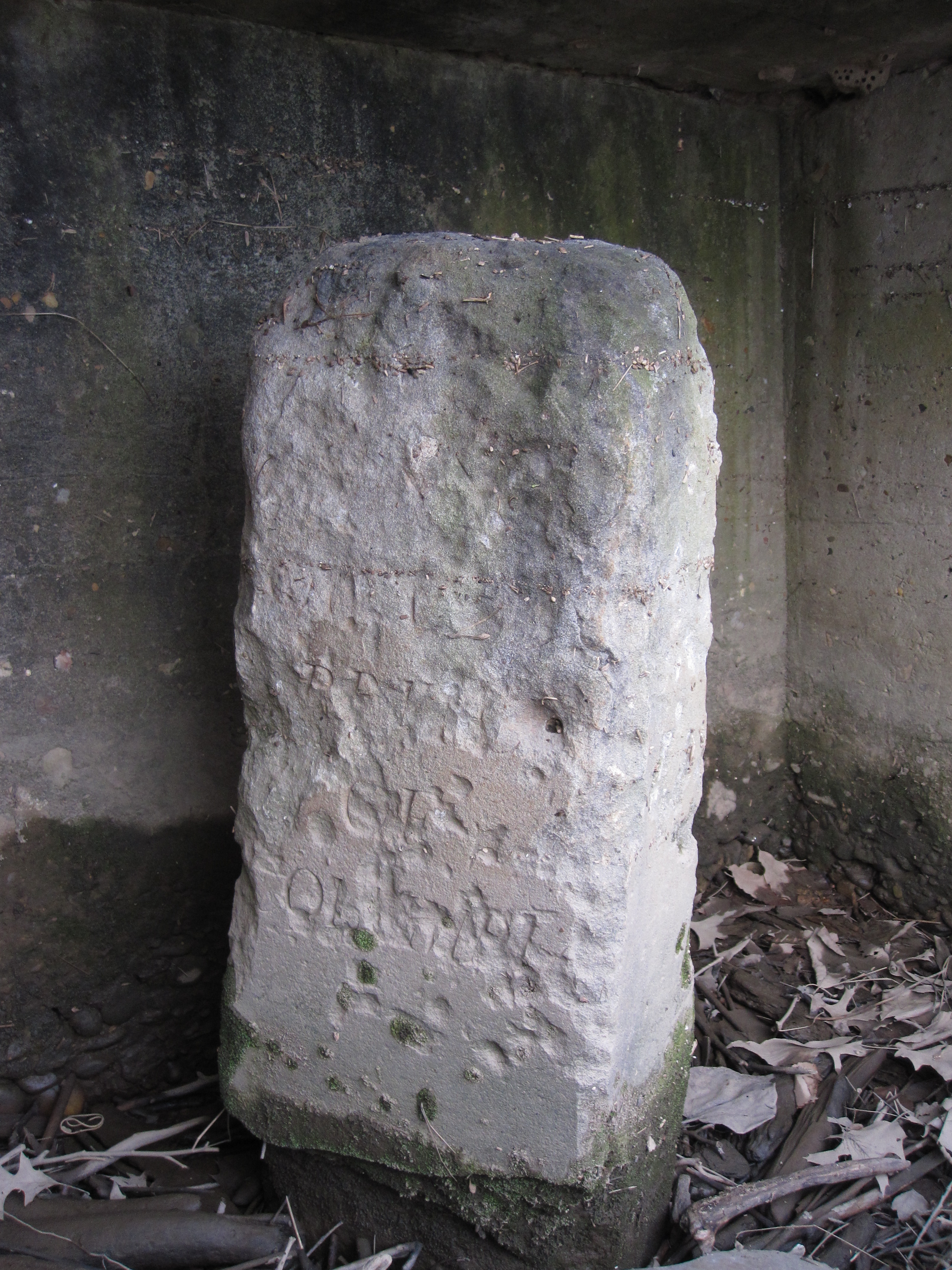
South cornerstone at Jones Point

Jones Point is a geographic point on the Potomac River within the city of Alexandria, Virginia, United States. The Jones Point Light and Jones Point Park are located at the point, which is immediately North of the confluence of Hunting Creek and the Potomac River.

== History ==
The 1791–1792 survey of the original boundaries of the District of Columbia began at a spot that was then at the tip of a cape at the Point. The south cornerstone from the boundary survey remains in a seawall several yards south of the lighthouse (see: History of Washington, D.C., and Boundary markers of the original District of Columbia).

During World War I, Jones Point was home to a private shipyard owned by the Virginia Shipbuilding Corporation that was intended to produce cargo ships for the war effort. However, the first ship produced at the yard, SS Gunston Hall, was not completed until after the war's end. The shipyard was idled in 1921 following accusations of fraud against the owners and most equipment was auctioned off in 1922. In 1923, the property was leased to the Western Marine and Salvage Company to dismantle surplus wood ships. After that company relocated to Maryland, the remaining property at the shipyard was auctioned off in 1928 and the former shipyard facilities were largely demolished.

== Description ==
The Woodrow Wilson Bridge crosses the park, most of which is under the jurisdiction of the National Park Service. The Mount Vernon Trail travels through the park.

The City of Alexandria had hosted many anniversary celebrations, starting in the 1980s, centered around its anniversary on July 10, at Jones Point, including its 250th in 1999, and often featuring a fireworks display. Beginning in 2002, they have been largely held at Oronoco Bay Park, located further north along the Potomac.

Jones Point underwent a major renovation, completed in 2012, which included National Park Service placards along walking and biking trails highlighting its history. Other improvements include larger parking lots, a basketball court, a playground, a concession stand, restrooms, new walking and bike paths, small fishing/sightseeing piers, and easy access to the Jones Point lighthouse. The National Park Service and others have erected in and near the park a number of markers that relate the history of Jones Point and its surroundings. One of the few visible remnants of the shipyard is the fitting-out dock, next to which is a grass lawn bound by a concrete retaining wall representing the length and width of SS Gunston Hall's hull.
