= Santaella Studios for the Arts =

Coordinates: 27°57′32.5″N 82°29′8″W

Santaella Studios for the Arts, formerly West Tampa Center for the Arts (WTCA) and Gallery 1906, is an exhibition space for artists that also includes 30 studios. It is located in a historic Santaella Cigar Factory in West Tampa, Florida at 1906 North Armenia Avenue.

Artists include photographers, painters, and printmakers: Stacy Larsen, Alex Espalter-Torres, Lynn Manos, James Oleson, Laszlo Horvath, Debra Radke and Laura Gattis Photography, among others.

The building was owned by Gray Ellier and the Ellis-Van Pelt family. A furniture company occupied the first floor and basement of the building. The concept for the combined artist studio and exhibition space came from the Torpedo Factory Art Center in Alexandria, Virginia.
