= Chinquapin Village =

Military housing development in Virginia, US

Coordinates: 38°49′18″N 77°4′57″W

Chinquapin Village or Chinquapin Village War Housing Project was a United States Military housing development located on King Street in Alexandria, Virginia.

== History ==
Built in 1941 by the United States Military, the village housed white workers from Alexandria's nearby torpedo factory. Cameron Valley, another military housing development, also housed white war workers. Ramsay Houses, located on North Patrick Street in Alexandria, housed African American war workers.

Chinquapin Village consisted of 150 wooden duplexes that housed 300 families. One, two, and three bedroom units were assigned by lottery based on family size.

The village homes were demolished in 1958.

== Today ==
The Chinquapin Park Recreation Center & Aquatics Facility and a community garden now occupy the land where the village once stood.
