= Laurin McCracken =

American watercolor painter (born 1942)

Laurin McCracken (born 12 November 1942 in Meridian, Mississippi) is an American watercolor painter known for his photorealistic still lifes, florals, landscapes and other subjects.

== Biography ==
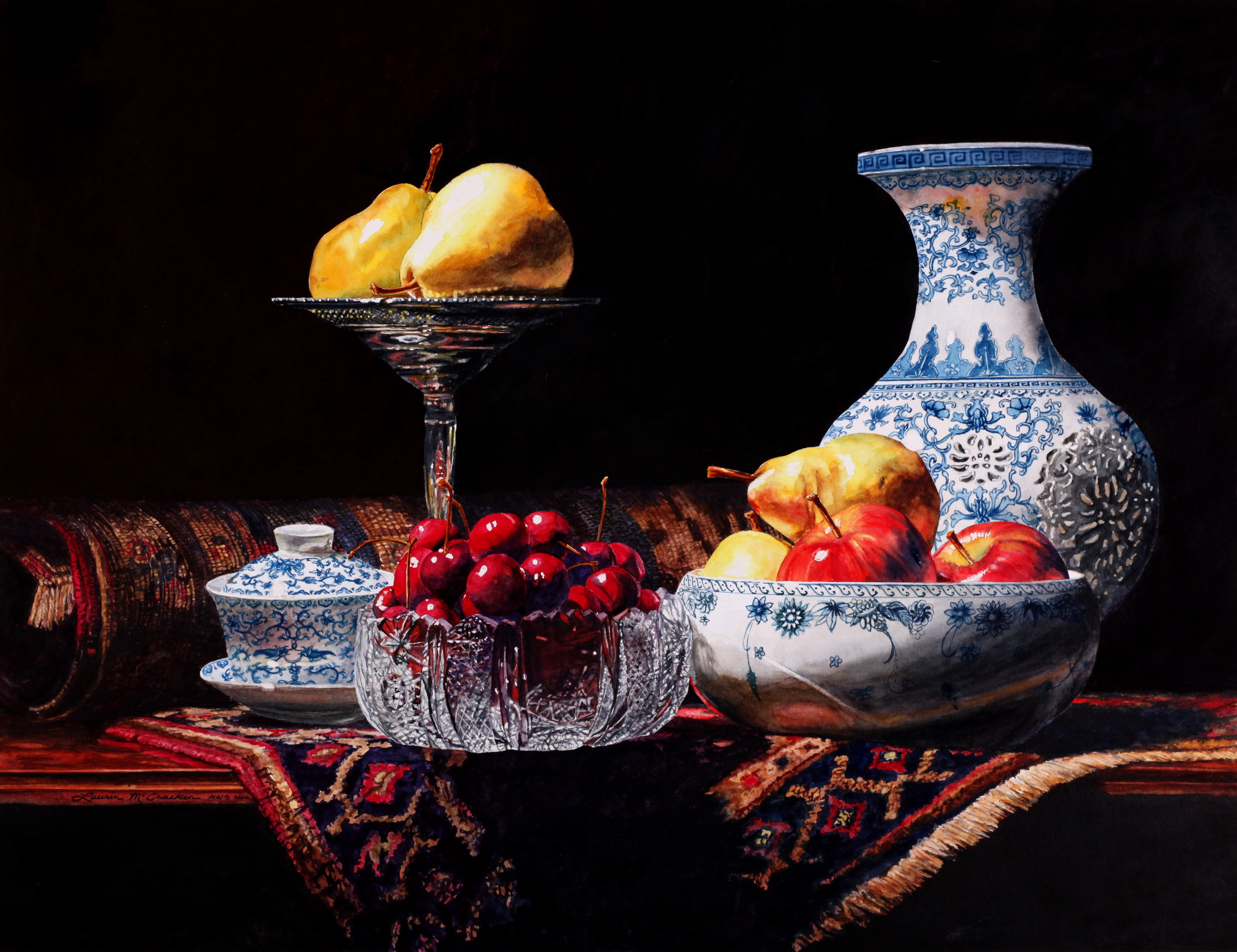
Fruit, Crystal & Chinese Porcelain

McCracken earned a B.A. in Art and Architecture from Rice University. He also graduated from Princeton University with a Master's in Architecture and Urban Planning. For forty years, McCracken worked as an architect and the head of marketing for several of the nation's leading architectural and engineering firms. McCracken took his first watercolor classes in 1999 with Gwen Bragg at The Art League in Alexandria, Virginia.

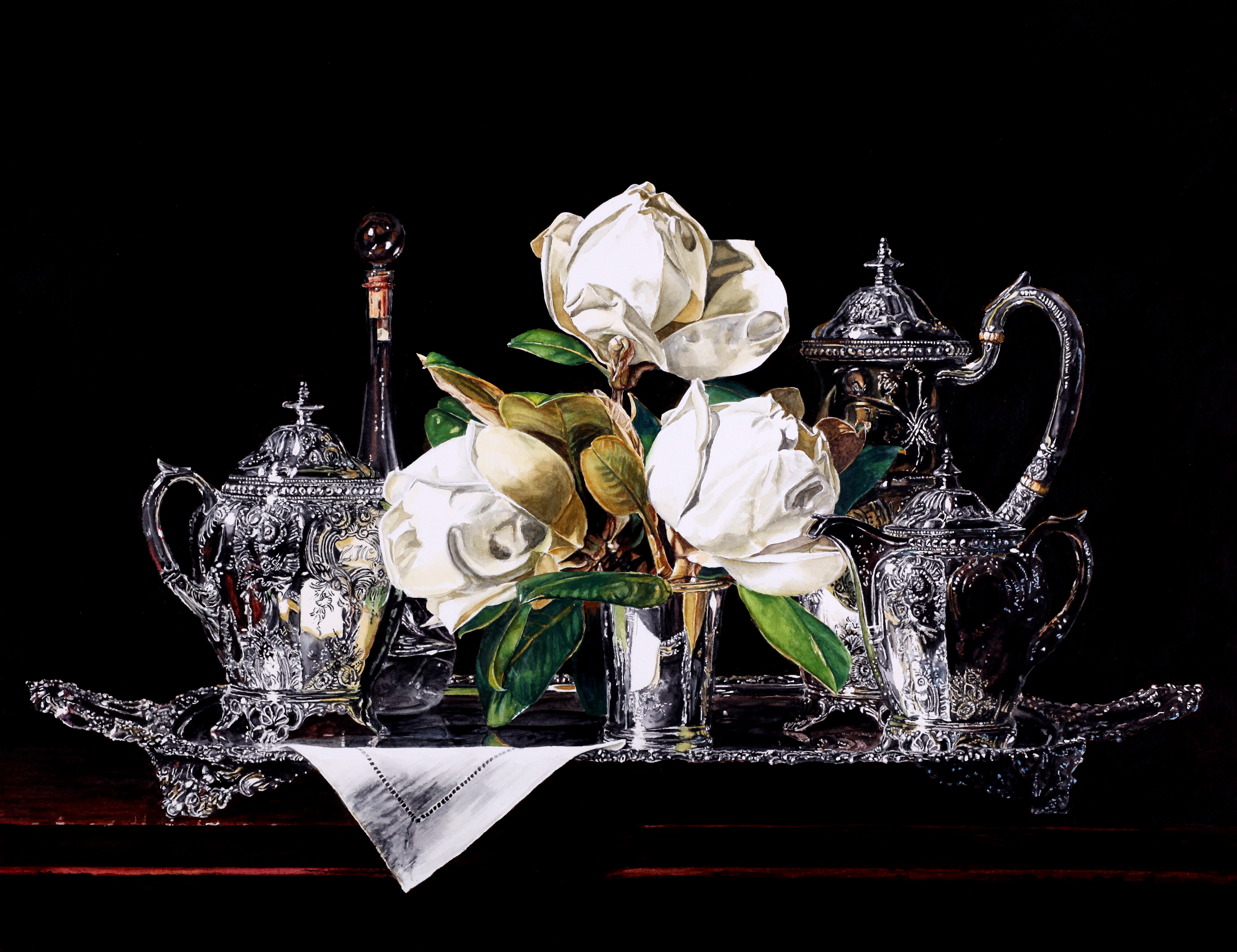
Three Magnolias with Silver

He also studied under Alain Gavin, a professor at The Art Institute of Chicago. McCracken retired and began painting full-time. He lives and works in Fort Worth, Texas.

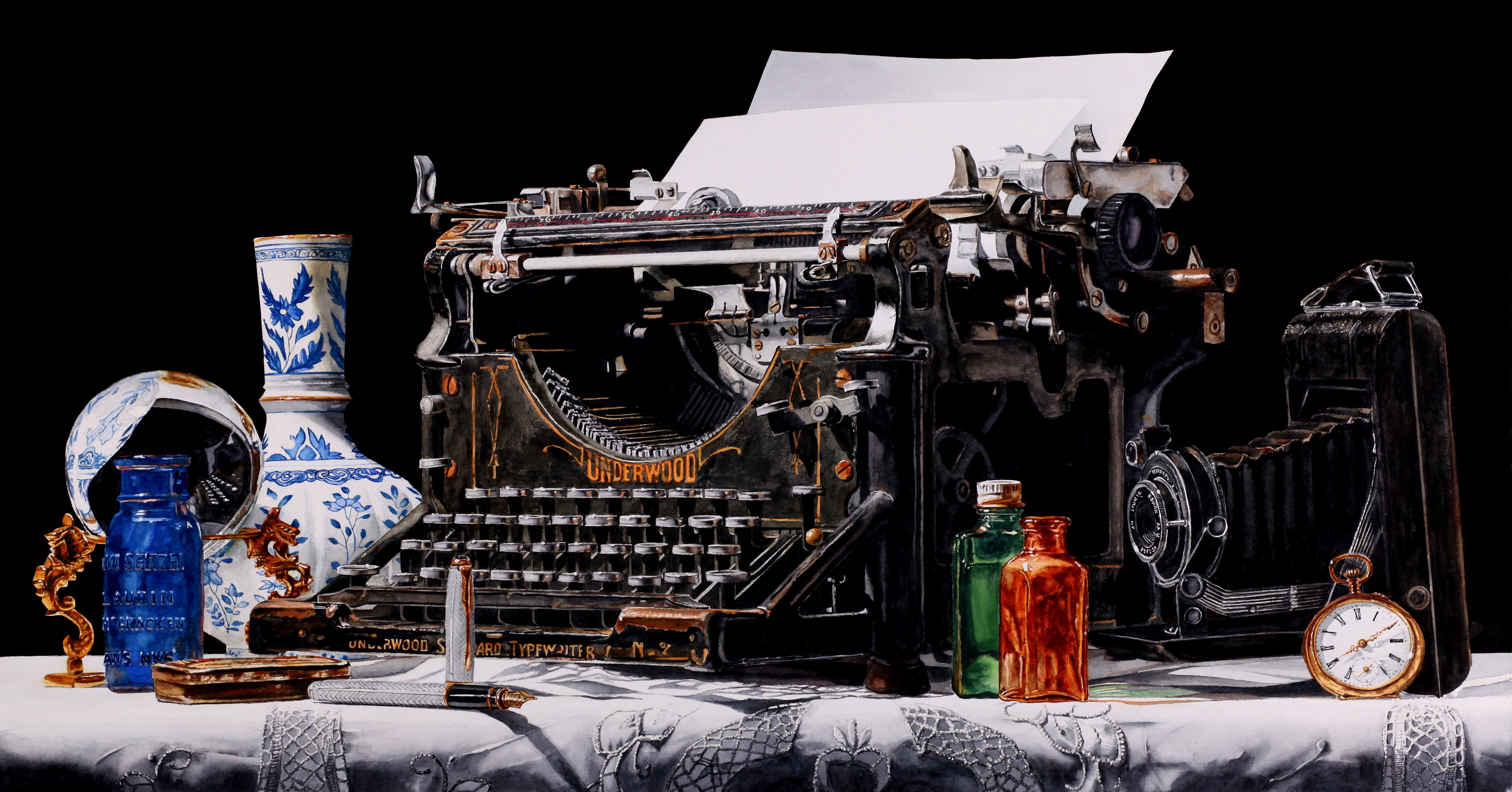
Underwood

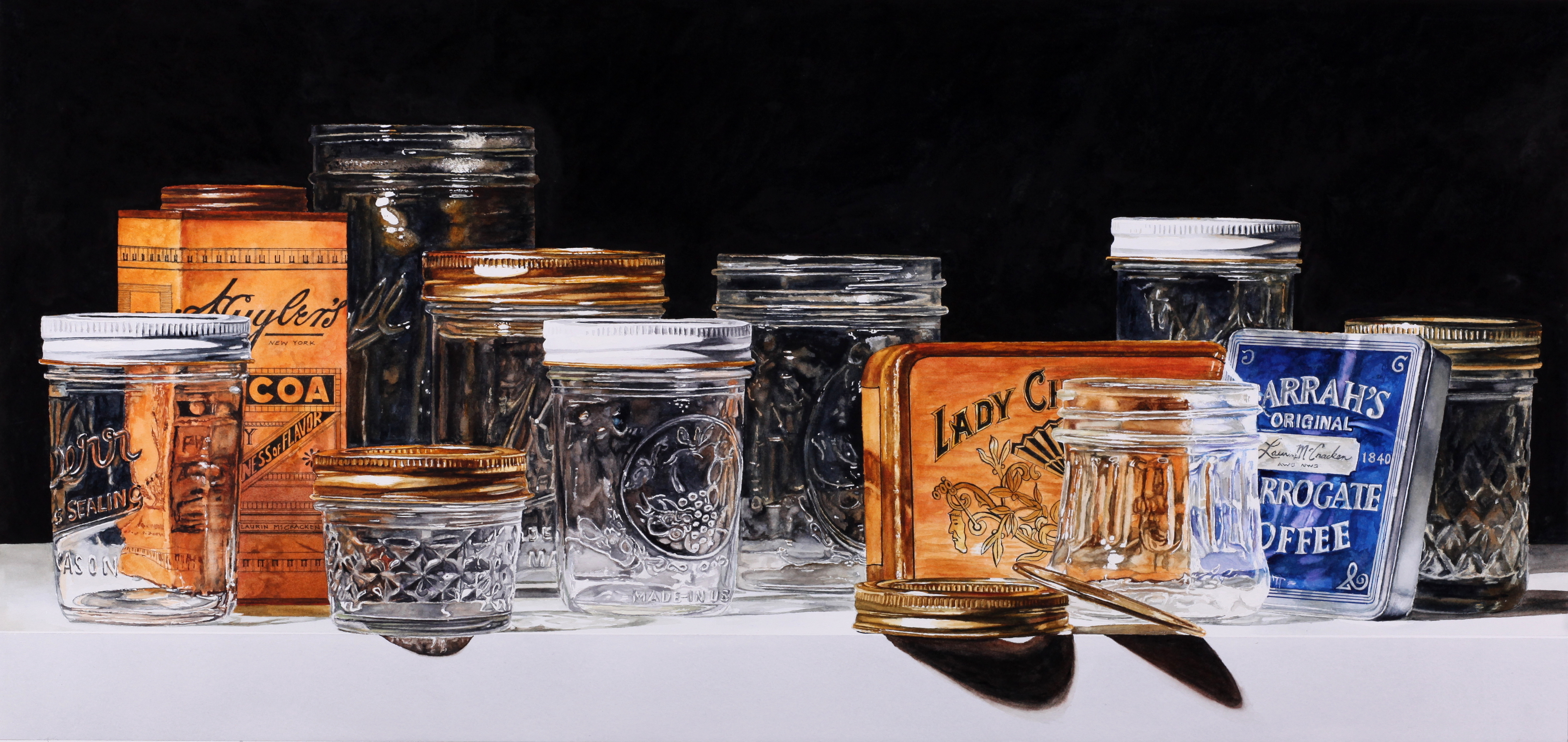
Lady Churchill Cigars

== Style and influences ==
McCracken is influenced by the Flemish Baroque school of still life where meticulous attention is paid to detail. These works of art are centered around compositions of flowers, eating utensils in the style and manner of the ontbijtje of "little breakfast", while these Flemish works were of a style of Vanitas, McCraken's work is not philosophical in the sense that the subject is meant to communicate the transience of life or ephemeral nature of existence. McCracken's work is tied more closely to the more current photorealism school with a subject matter or influence of the Flemish Baroque period. Stylistically, McCraken's work also reflects the Flemish Baroque characteristic of lighting the subject matter from the left against a dark background. Unlike the Flemish school, McCracken accomplishes his work in watercolor with a technique and quality that rivals the original medium of oil.

== Memberships ==
McCracken has earned signature status in more than a dozen watercolor societies, including the American Watercolor Society, National Watercolor Society, Transparent Watercolor Society of America, Southern Watercolor Society, Society of Watercolor Artists, Tennessee Watercolor Society, Watercolor West, and the Watercolor USA Honor Society. He is also an Elected Member of the Allied Artists of America, Inc.

== Recognitions and awards ==
- Hardie Gramatky Memorial Award - The 137th Annual International Exhibition of the American Watercolor Society (2004)
- Totally Transparent Watercolor Award "Best of Show" - The 29th Annual Juried Exhibition of the Tennessee Watercolor Society (2004)
- Board of Directors Award - Watercolor Missouri National (2009)
- First Place - The 29th Annual Juried Exhibition of The Society of Watercolor Artists, Inc. (2010)
- The Kent Day Coes Memorial Award - The Allied Artists of America, Inc. (2010)
- Totally Transparent and Region III Award - Tennessee Watercolor Society 33rd Exhibition (2012)
- Finalist in Still Life Category - Art Renewal Center's International 2012/2013 ARC Salon
- First Prize - Professional Artist Magazine (2013)

== Juried Shows ==
- Beijing International Art Biennale 2011, 2013, 2015
- Shenzhen International Watercolor Biennial, 2013, 2015
- Shanghai Zhoujiajiao International Watercolor Biennial Exhibition 2010 & 2012
- World Watermedia Exhibition 2014, Thailand
- Eau en Coleurs 2014, International Watercolour Biennial, Belgium
- Qingdao International Watercolour Salon, China 2014
- International Watercolor Convention, Fabriano, Italy, 2014
- Masters of Watercolour, St. Petersburg, Russia, 2015
- Malaysian Watercolour International Exhibition, 2014-2015
- China/NWS Small Image Exchange Exhibition, 2015-2016
- AWS 149th Annual International Exhibition, New York City, 2016

== Museum Collections and Shows ==
- National Art Museum of China
- Asian Museum of Watercolor Art, Haikou City, Hainan Province, China
- Meridian Museum of Art, Meridian, Mississippi - 2005, 2010
- Fort Wayne Museum of Art, Contemporary American Realism: 2008 Biennial
- Spartanburg Art Museum, Spartanburg, South Carolina - Contemporary Still Life Invitational Exhibit - 2012
- Gadsden Cultural Arts Foundation 2013
- Delta State University, Reflecting Realism, 2014
- R. W. Norton Art Foundation, Shreveport, Louisiana - 2014
- Quingdao Watercolor Salon Exhibition, Contemporary Art Museum, China - 2014

== Selected publications ==
- A Celebration of Light, 2007, Jane Freeman, North Light Books
- Masters of Realistic Imagery, 2012 - Art Domain, Leipzig, Germany
