= U.S. Naval Torpedo Station, Alexandria =

Coordinates: 38.8049°N 77.0398°W

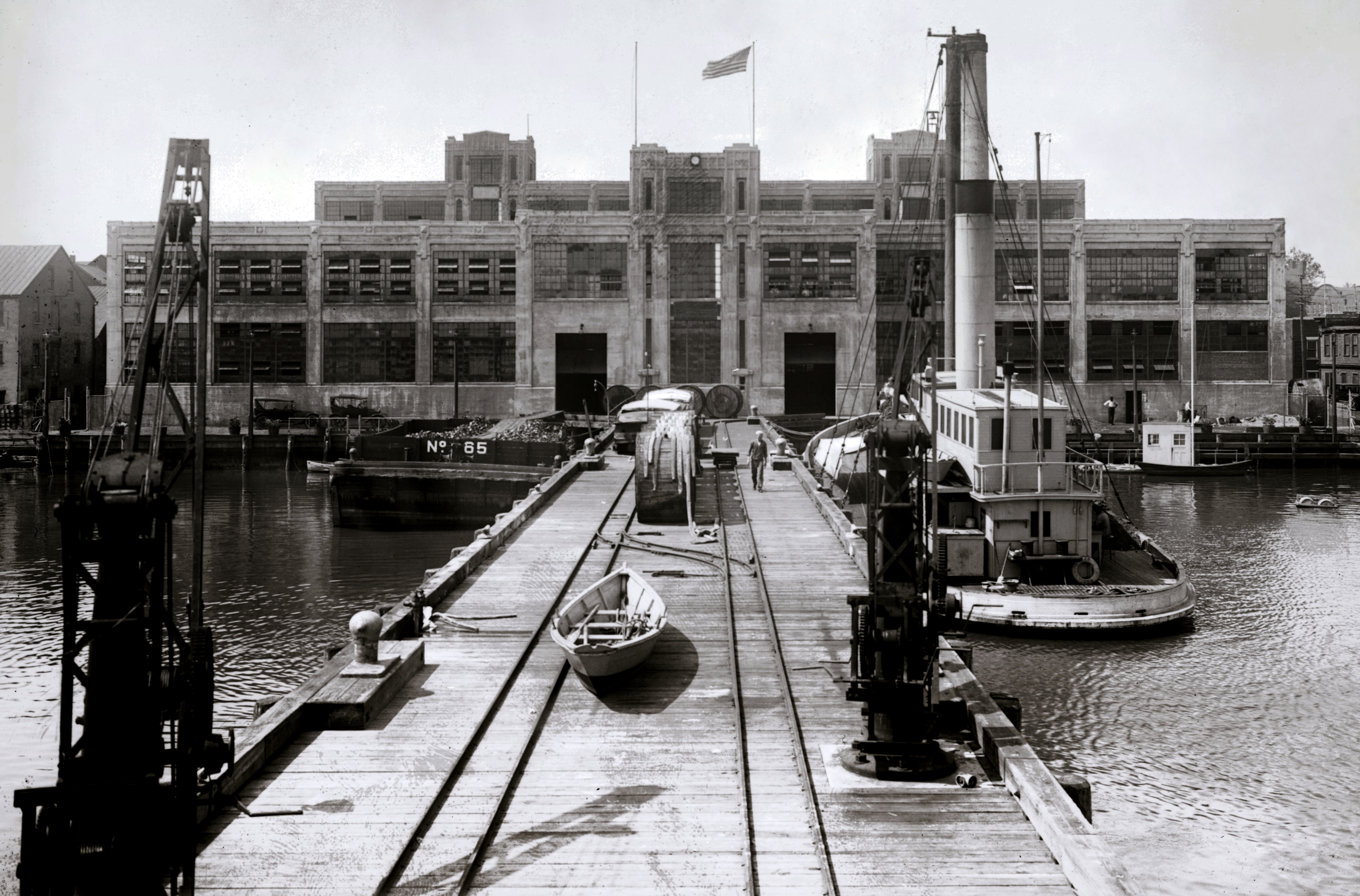
The torpedo station in 1922

U.S. Naval Torpedo Station, Alexandria was a facility of the United States Navy, located in Alexandria, Virginia, that existed from 1918 to 1945. After its closure, it was redeveloped into the Torpedo Factory Art Center.

== History ==
On November 12, 1918, the U.S. Navy began constructing a torpedo factory in Alexandria, named the U.S. Naval Torpedo Station. Over the next five years it was responsible for the manufacture and maintenance of torpedoes, and it subsequently served as a munitions storage area until World War II. As the demand for weapons dramatically increased during the war, it resumed production activity and was substantially expanded with ten new buildings. A green Mark 14 torpedo manufactured in the factory in 1945 is still on display. The station was commanded by Robert W. Hayler until June 1942 and then by Captain Robert B. Simons until the end of War.

After World War II, production ceased, and the factory was used throughout the 1950s and 1960s by the Smithsonian Institution, which stored art and paleontological items there, and by Congress for storing documents. In 1969, the president of the Art League, Marian Van Landingham, proposed to adapt the building into studios for working artists. Following the approval of the commission, the factory was purchased by the City of Alexandria from the federal government, and it was reopened as the Torpedo Factory Art Center.
