= Robert W. Hayler =

American Vice admiral (1891–1980)

Robert Ward Hayler
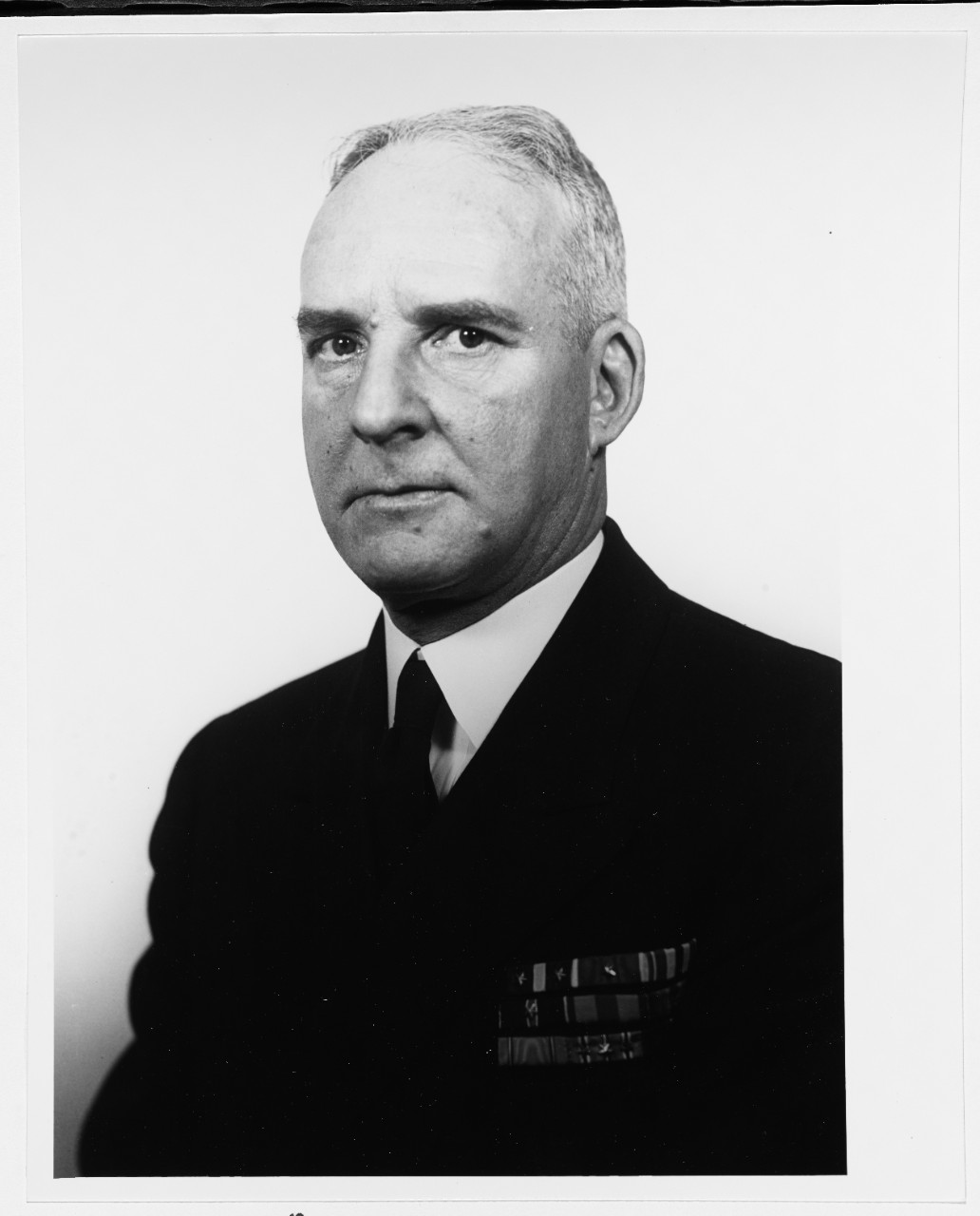
- VADM Robert W. Hayler, USN
- Born: June 7, 1891; Sandusky, Ohio, US
- Died: November 17, 1980 (aged 89); Carmel, California, US
- Burial place: Arlington National Cemetery
- Military career
- Allegiance: United States
- Branch: United States Navy
- Service years: 1914 – 1952
- Rank: Vice admiral
- Service number: 0-8611
- Commands: Sixth Naval district Cruiser Division Twelve; USS Honolulu (CL-48); Naval Torpedo Station Alexandria; USS Melvin (DD-335); USS Howard (DD-179)
- Conflicts: Veracruz Expedition; World War I World War II: Aleutian Islands campaign; Battle of Guadalcanal; Battle of Tassafaronga; Battle of Kula Gulf; Bougainville campaign; Battle of Saipan; Battle of Tinian; Battle of Leyte Gulf; Battle of Surigao Strait
- Awards: Navy Cross (3); Silver Star; Legion of Merit (2); Bronze Star Medal (2); Navy Commendation Medal

Robert Ward Hayler (June 7, 1891 – November 17, 1980) was a highly decorated officer in the United States Navy with the rank of vice admiral. He was a three time recipient of the Navy Cross, the Navy's second highest military decoration for valor. Two of these awards were received while serving as the commanding officer of the light cruiser USS Honolulu at Guadalcanal and Kula Gulf and the third as a rear admiral and Commander, Cruiser Division Twelve during the Battle of Surigao Strait in October 1944.

Following the Second World War, Hayler remained in the Navy and served as commandant, Sixth Naval District and president, Permanent General Court Martial for the Ninth Naval District until his retirement in July 1953. He was also the namesake of USS Hayler (DD-997).

== Early career ==
Robert Ward Hayler was born on June 7, 1891, in Sandusky, Ohio, to Edward G. Hayler (1864–1939), a railroad commercial agent and Nellie Gould-Hayler (1864–1939). He spent much of his youth in Muncie, Indiana, where he graduated from high school in summer 1909. Hayler subsequently earned an appointment to the United States Naval Academy at Annapolis, Maryland, where he was active in football and served as manager of the football team.

Among his classmates were many future admirals during World War II, including John H. Brown Jr., William K. Harrill, Joseph R. Redman, Robert W. Cary Jr., John B. W. Waller, Wilder D. Baker, Carleton F. Bryant, Richard L. Conolly, Oliver Kessing, Frank L. Lowe, Edward L. Cochrane, Ralph O. Davis and Edward Ellsberg.

Hayler graduated with a Bachelor of Science degree on June 6, 1914, and was commissioned an ensign on that date. He was subsequently attached to the battleship USS Georgia and took part in the patrolling of Caribbean and Mexican waters during the Mexican Revolution. Following the United States's entry into World War I, Hayler was transferred to the battleship USS Oklahoma and participated in naval operations with the British Grand Fleet in the North Sea, Scapa Flow and the Orkney islands. He was promoted to lieutenant (junior grade) on June 6, 1917, and to the temporary rank of lieutenant on August 31 that year.

== Interwar period ==
Following the First World War, Hayler was ordered to the Massachusetts Institute of Technology in Boston for postgraduate training in engineering, which he completed with a Master of Science degree in October 1920. He was subsequently ordered to the Washington Navy Yard, where he completed instruction in naval ordnance and assumed command of the destroyer USS Howard in July 1921. Hayler commanded Howard during a series of exercises off the coast of San Diego, California, including torpedo practice, patrol, battle practices, and exercises with submarines.

He was detached in January 1922 and assigned to the destroyer tender USS Rigel homeported at San Diego. Hayler was transferred to the Naval Torpedo Station at Newport, Rhode Island, in August 1924 and remained there until August 1926, when he was transferred to the staff of Destroyer Squadron 9, Scouting Fleet as gunnery officer. He was meanwhile promoted to lieutenant commander on January 8, 1925.

Hayler returned to the Naval Torpedo Station at Newport, Rhode Island, in July 1929 and remained there until May 1931, when he was assigned to the light cruiser USS Omaha under the command of Captain Andrew C. Pickens. Hayler served with her in the Caribbean and Atlantic and was transferred to the staff of Commander, Scouting Force under Vice Admiral Arthur L. Willard.

In June 1934, Hayler began his third tour at the Naval Torpedo Station and was promoted to commander on June 1, 1935. He was appointed Commander, Destroyer Division 28 aboard the destroyer USS Southard in June 1937 and served in the Pacific with the Battle Force for two years. Hayler was then appointed Officer-in-Charge, Naval Torpedo Station Alexandria, Virginia, in July 1939 and following his promotion to captain on September 1, 1940, he was appointed Inspector of Ordnance in Charge of the Alexandria Torpedo Station. He was later decorated with the Navy Commendation Medal for this assignment.

== World War II ==
=== USS Honolulu ===
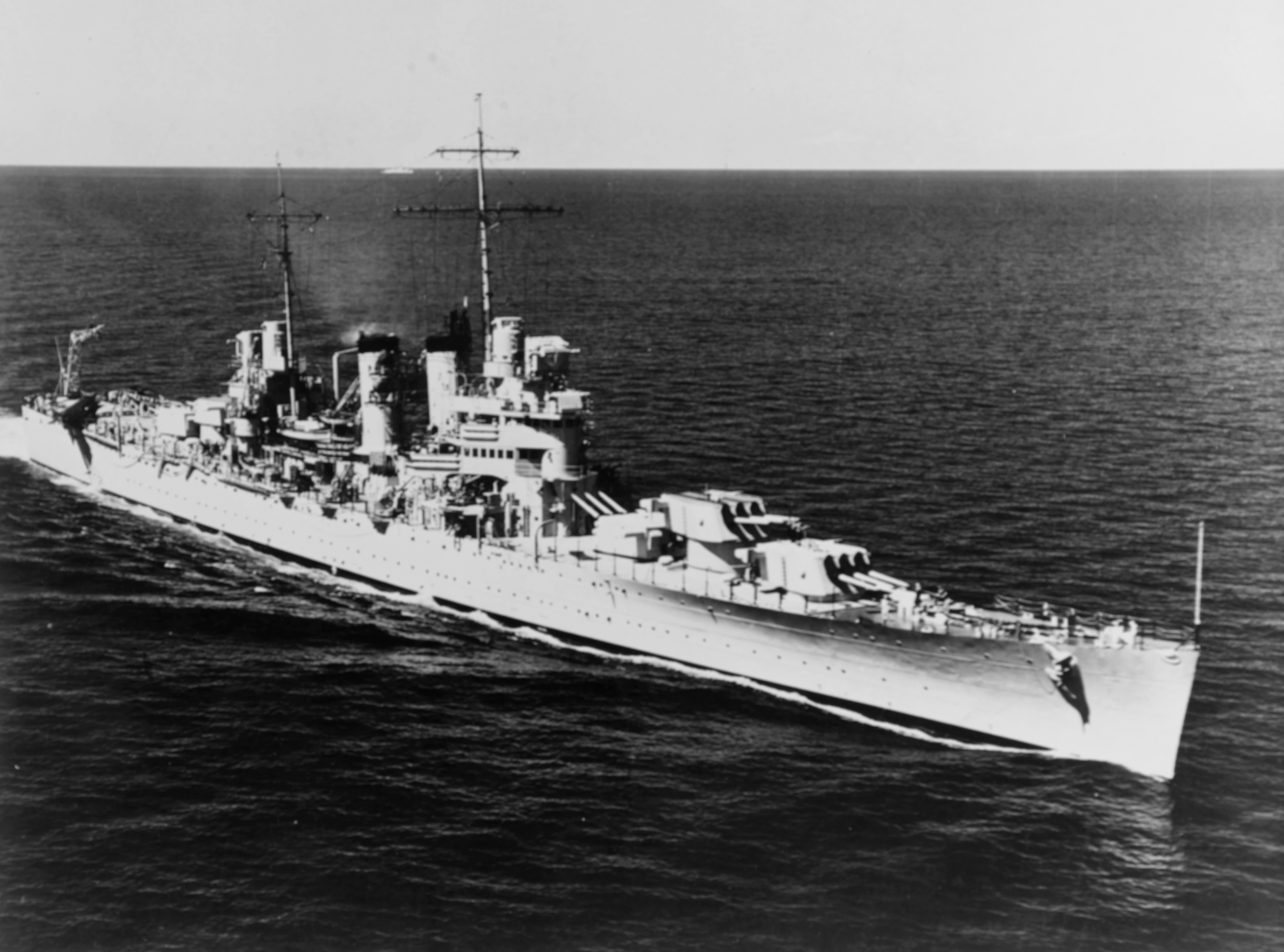
The light cruiser Honolulu, which Hayler commanded between July 1942 and March 1944.

Following the Japanese attack on Pearl Harbor and the United States's entry into World War II, Hayler still served at Newport, but requested sea duty and was appointed commanding officer of the light cruiser USS Honolulu in July 1942. He immediately directed his ship to the Aleutian Islands in the North Pacific Ocean in August that year and took part in the bombardment of Kiska. Hayler then returned with Honolulu to Mare Island Navy Yard for some upgrades and repairs and embarked for South Pacific, escorting a convoy to Nouméa, New Caledonia in early November 1942.

Later that month, Honolulu sailed from Espiritu Santo in the New Hebrides Islands to intercept a Japanese Navy convoy attempting to reinforce their positions on Guadalcanal in the Solomon Islands. During the Battle of Tassafaronga on the night of November 30, 1942, Hayler and his Honolulu were part of the task force of five cruisers and six destroyers which attacked the Japanese convoy and sank one enemy destroyer at the cost of four damaged American cruisers. One of the four, USS Northampton, sank several hours later. His seamanship in bringing the Honolulu through without damage and his leadership under fire were direct factors in the sinking of the Japanese destroyer and contributed to the turning back of the enemy forces. For his service at Tassafaronga, Hayler was decorated with his first Navy Cross, the Navy's second highest military decoration for valor.

USS Honolulu operated out of Espiritu Santo in early 1943 in an attempt to engage the "Tokyo Express". Her commanding officer Hayler received the Bronze Star Medal with Combat "V" for his service. During May, Honolulu engaged in bombardments of New Georgia in the Solomons supporting the landings on Rendova Island on July 4, 1943. Two days later, Hayler and Honolulu fought in the Battle of Kula Gulf, in which two enemy destroyers were sunk and two damaged. For his service on Rendova and Kula Gulf, Hayler received his second Navy Cross.

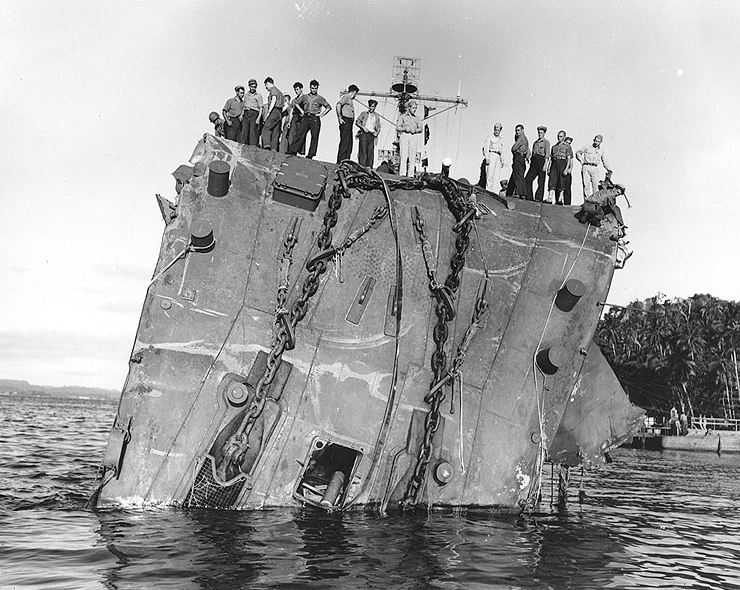
Collapsed bow of the light cruiser Honolulu, after she was torpedoed in the Battle of Kolombangara on July 13, 1943. Hayler was able to return with his ship to the U.S. for repairs.

Hayler then commanded Honolulu in the Battle of Kolombangara on July 12, 1943, when he participated in the interception of a Japanese troop convoy. In the ensuing action, the Japanese sank one Allied destroyer and damaged three cruisers. They were also able to successfully land 1,200 ground troops on the western coast of Kolombangara but lost one light cruiser sunk with all hands in the process. Hayler handled his ship skillfully, evading three hostile torpedoes fired at Honolulu and eventually, when his vessel was hit by a fourth, ably directed damage control and finally brought his crippled ship safely into port. For his service at Kolombangara, he was decorated with the Silver Star.

The torpedo which hit the Honolulu blew off her bow as far back as the forward turret (the ship was also holed in the stern by a torpedo which did not explode) and Hayler was forced to retire to Tulagi for temporary repairs, and then departed for the large naval base at Pearl Harbor, arriving in mid-August 1943. The damage was so serious, that Honolulu was ordered to Mare Island Navy Yard, near San Francisco for more work. The repairs were completed in mid-November and Hayler steered Honolulu back to the combat area in the South Pacific.

After returning to the Pacific in December 1943, Hayler commanded the Honolulu during the bombardment of Bougainville, where she destroyed concentrations of troops, supplies and barges. He then took part in the screening operations during the landings at Green Island and then withdrew from the area in order to prepare for the Mariana Islands Operation. The Honolulu received a Navy Unit Commendation for her actions under Hayler's command.

=== Flag assignments ===
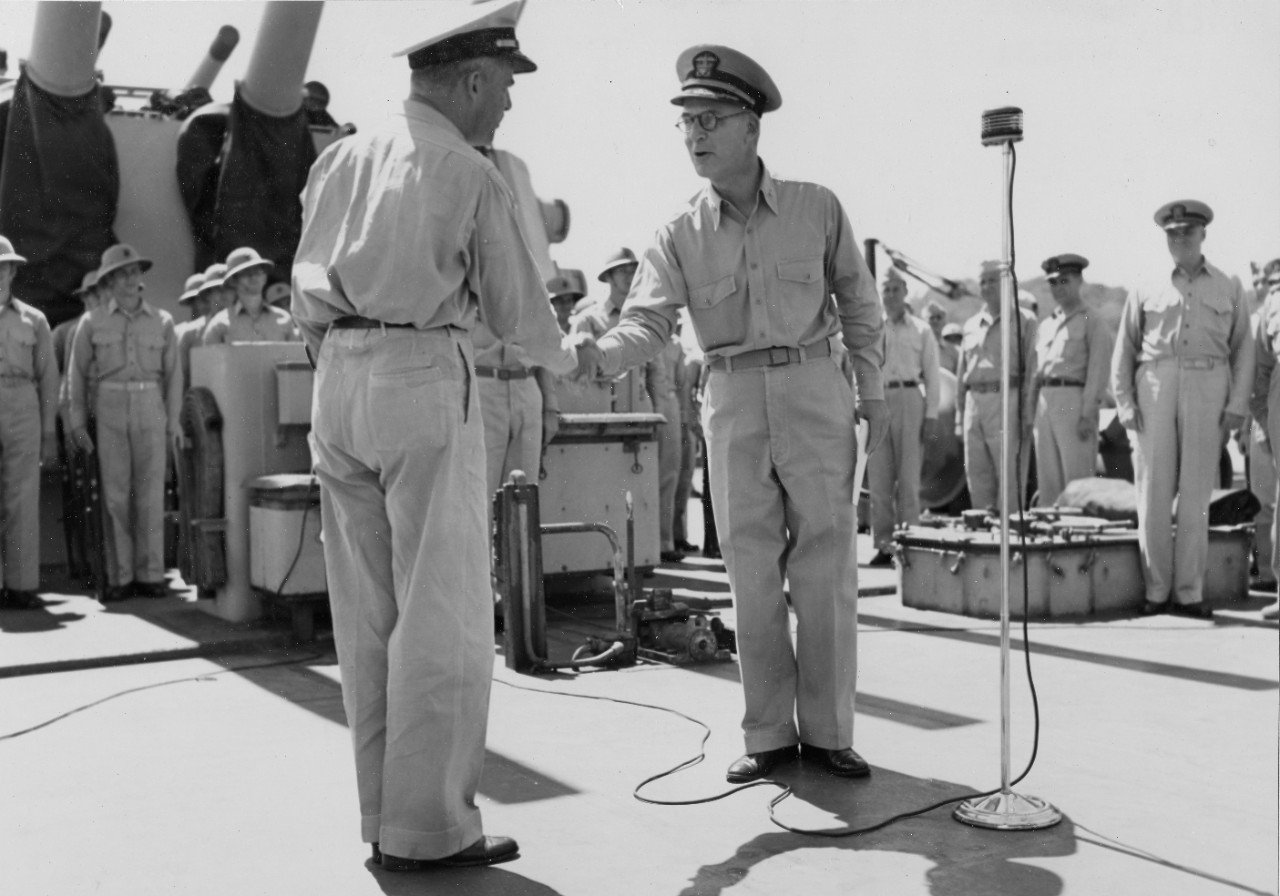
Hayler (right with glasses) relieves "Tip" Merrill (left) as Commander, Cruiser Division 12 on March 26, 1944.

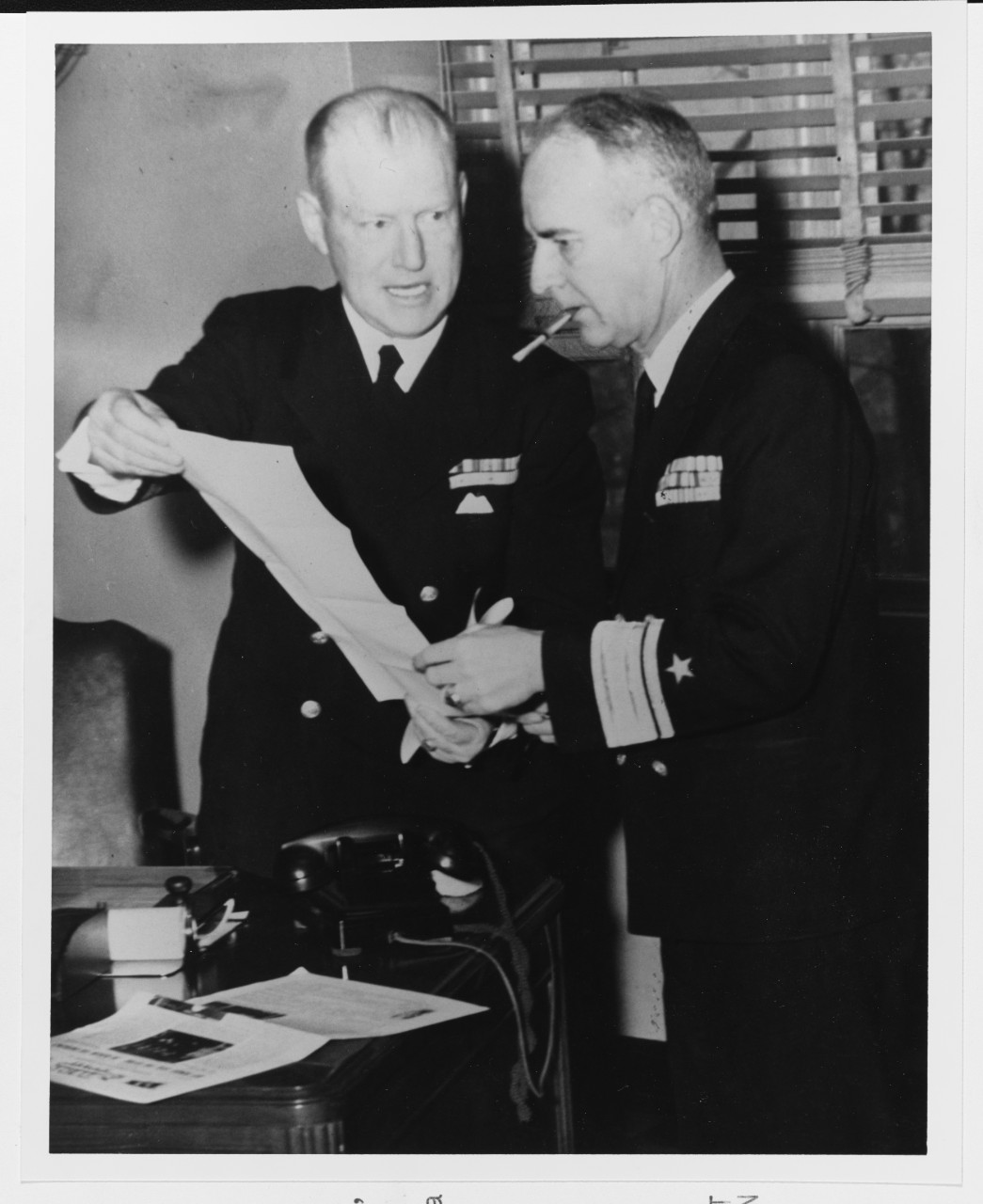
Hayler (right) and Captain Robert B. Simons, USN, Commander of the Naval Torpedo Station Alexandria examines paperwork at circa 1945. Hayler commanded the station in 1939–1942.

Hayler was promoted to rear admiral in March 1944 and succeeded Aaron S. Merrill as Commander, Cruiser Division 12, which consisted of the Cleveland-class light cruisers Cleveland, Columbia, Montpelier, his flagship Denver and several destroyers. He then participated in the assaults in the Marianas which captured Saipan, Tinian and Palau, and received the Legion of Merit with Combat "V" and a second Bronze Star Medal for his services.

At the end of October 1944, Hayler's division participated in the Battle of Surigao Strait (the last battleship-to-battleship action in history) during the recapture of the Philippines. As a formidable column of Japanese battleships, cruisers and destroyers advanced under cover of darkness toward the Allied invasion fleet in the Leyte Gulf, the left flank of the defending American force opened the battle: destroyers launched torpedo attacks against them as Hayler's cruisers maneuvered into gunnery range and opened fire.

After the Japanese fleet was repelled by the combined American fleet, Hayler was detached to pursue the retreating Japanese warships and close the battle as he had opened it. For his part in the Battle of Surigao Strain, Hayler was decorated with his third Navy Cross.

Afterwards, Hayler and his ships supported the amphibious invasion of Leyte, the largest amphibious operation in the Southeast Pacific Area. He received his second Legion of Merit for his leadership. Hayler was ordered back to the United States in March 1945, where he served as a member of the General Board of the Navy until the end of the war.

== Postwar career ==
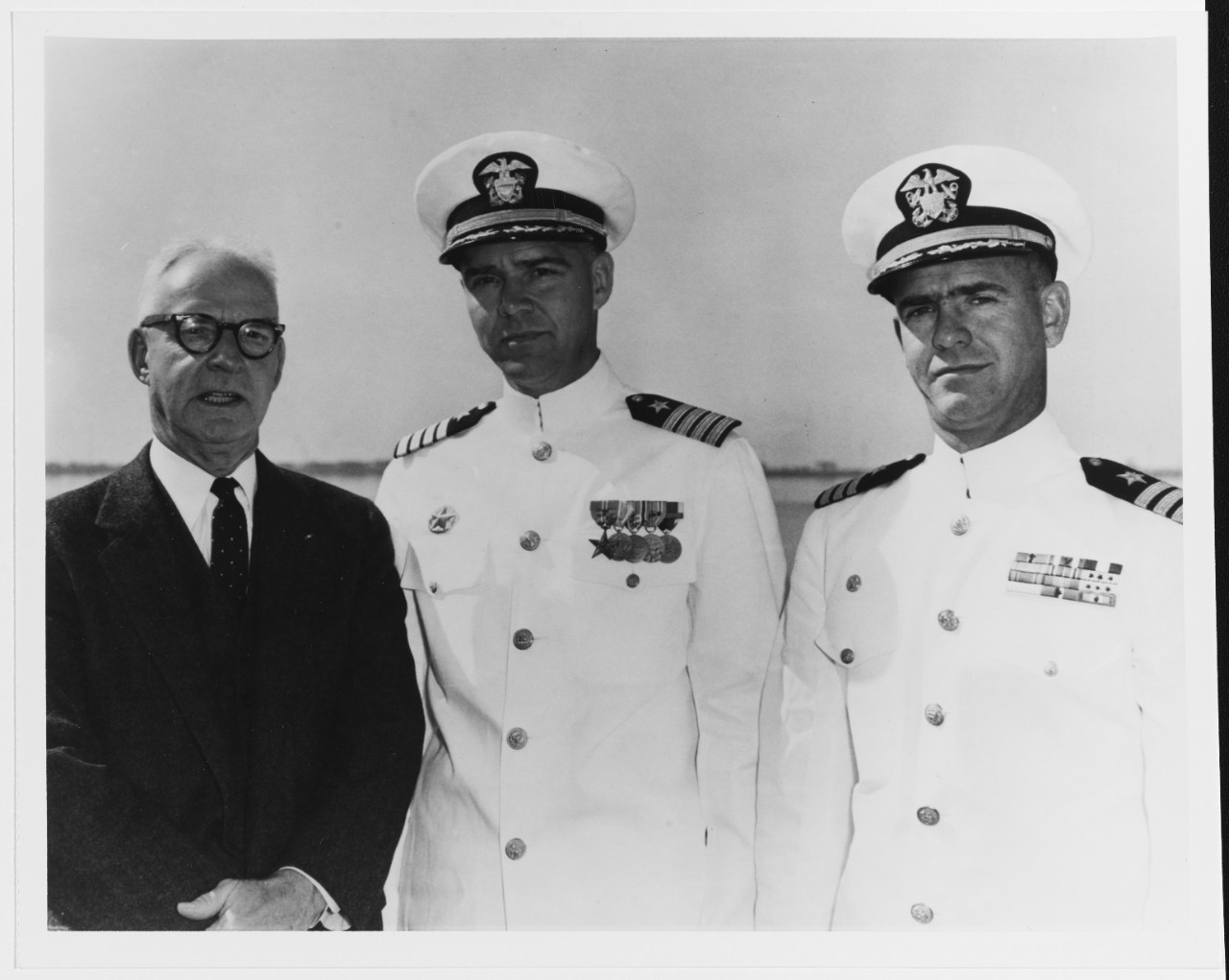
Vice Admiral Hayler (left) and his sons Robert Jr. and William at Long Beach, California in 1961.

Hayler remained in the Navy after the Second World War, becoming a senior member of the Board of Decorations and Medals in the Office of Chief of Naval Operations under Fleet Admiral Chester Nimitz and Admiral Louis E. Denfeld. He was ordered to Charleston Navy Yard, South Carolina, where he became the commandant of the Sixth Naval District. While in this capacity, Hayler was responsible for naval activities in the geographic areas of South Carolina, Georgia, and North Carolina.

Hayler served as district commandant until June 30, 1951, when he retired from Navy service, but remained on active duty as president, Permanent General Court Martial for Ninth Naval District with headquarters at Naval Station Great Lakes, Illinois. He remained in that assignment until December 1952, when he retired for a second time after 38 years of service and was advanced to the rank of vice admiral on the retired list for having been specially commended in combat.

He settled in Carmel, California, and was active in the Naval Order of the United States. Vice Admiral Hayler died of pneumonia at his home on November 17, 1980, aged 89 and was buried with full military honors at Arlington National Cemetery, Virginia. His wife, Nola Birch Hayler (1895–1974) is buried beside him. They had two sons: Robert Jr. and William B., who both served in the Navy and retired as captains.

== Awards and decorations ==
Here is the ribbon bar of Vice Admiral Hayler:

1st Row	Navy Cross with two 5/16" Gold Stars		Silver Star
2nd Row	Legion of Merit with Combat "V" and one 5/16" Gold Star	Bronze Star Medal with Combat "V" and one 5/16" Gold Star	Navy Commendation Medal
3rd Row	Navy Unit Commendation	Mexican Service Medal	World War I Victory Medal with Fleet Clasp
4th Row	American Defense Service Medal	American Campaign Medal	Asiatic–Pacific Campaign Medal with one silver and two bronze 3/16 inch service stars
5th Row	World War II Victory Medal	National Defense Service Medal	Philippine Liberation Medal with two stars

== See also ==
- USS Honolulu

Military offices
Preceded by Laurance T. DuBose	Commandant, Sixth Naval district May 18, 1948 - July 1, 1951	Succeeded by Glenn B. Davis
Preceded by Aaron S. Merrill	Commander, Cruiser Division Twelve; March 1944 - January 1945	Succeeded by Ralph S. Riggs
