= The Art League =

Art organization based in Alexandria, Virginia

Founded in 1954, The Art League, Inc. a 501(c)(3) organization, is a multi-service organization for visual artists, as well as the founding organization of the Torpedo Factory Art Center in Alexandria, Virginia. In Old Town Alexandria, Virginia, The Art League offers exhibit opportunities for artists through its gallery, fine art education through a school, and outreach programs to the local community. The Art League was selected for the 2010-11 Catalogue for Philanthropy as "one of the best small charities in the Washington, DC Region."

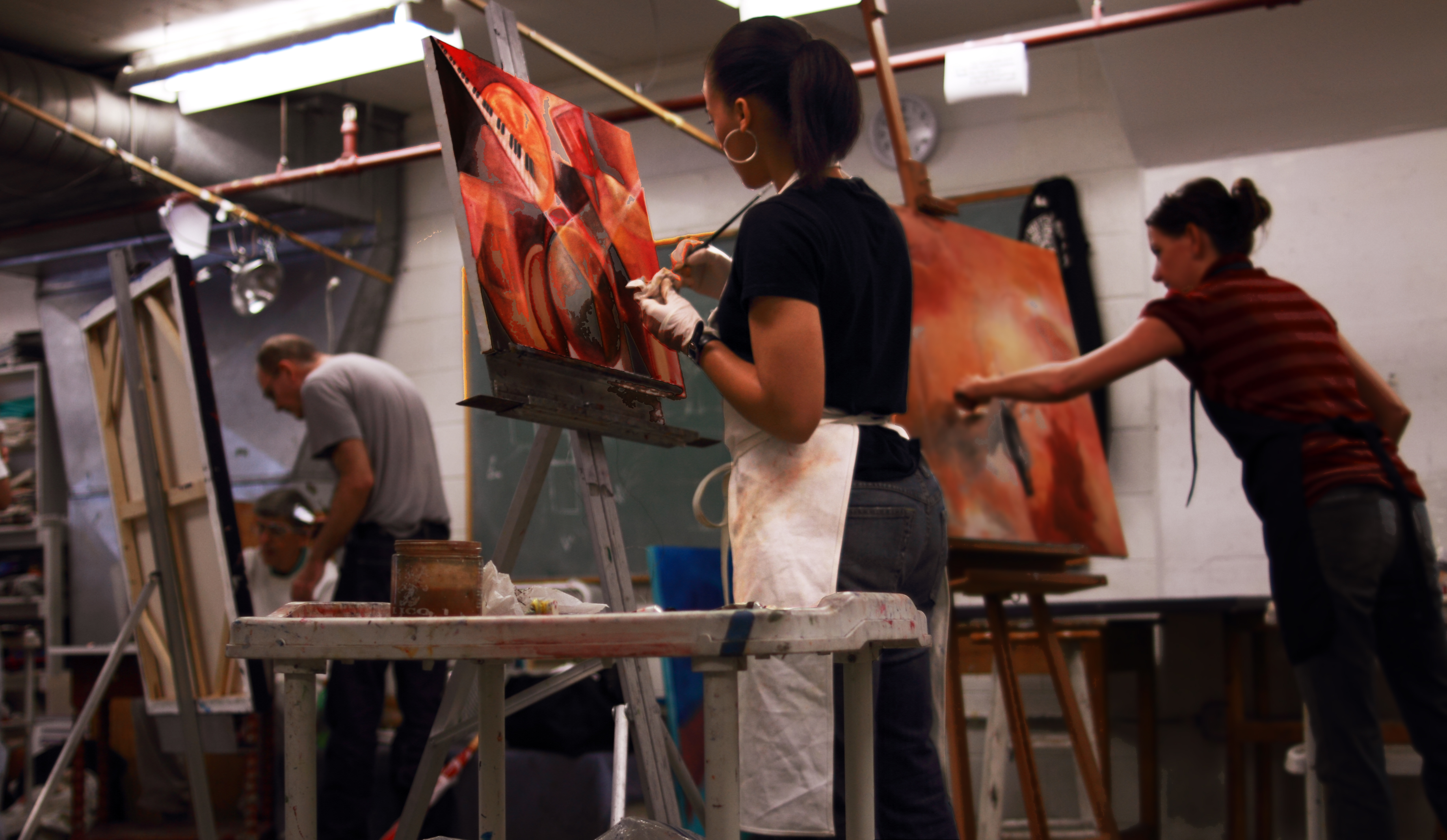
Painting students at The Art League School.

== History ==
Six art students and their teacher founded The Art League of Northern Virginia in 1954. The League's stated purpose was to foster art and arts appreciation, sponsor lectures, encourage study and hold exhibitions. In 1967, the organization was incorporated as a nonprofit, and in the years immediately following, the League removed rules limiting members to residents of Northern Virginia and shortened its name to The Art League, Inc. The League's mission states, "By nurturing the artist, we enrich the community. The Art League develops the artist through education, exhibition, and a stimulating, supportive environment while sharing the experience of the visual arts with the community."

The Art League played a critical role in the transformation of the City-owned, former U.S. Naval Torpedo Station into the Torpedo Factory Art Center. In 1974, Art League president and Virginia Delegate Marian Van Landingham proposed a project that would renovate the building into working studio spaces for artists. With the lease on its Cameron Street space expiring, The Art League was looking for a new location. After the renovation of the new art center, the League rented one-fifth of the space for its gallery and school.

Today, the gallery, offices, supply store, and some classrooms of The Art League are housed in the Torpedo Factory Art Center.

Continued growth led to the hiring of the first paid executive director, Cora Rupp, in 1981, along with other employees. In 2012, longtime executive director Linda Hafer retired, and Suzanne Bethel became the new executive director.

== School ==
The Art League School offers classes and workshops for students of all skill levels and ages, in nearly all of the fine visual arts. Classes and workshops are offered year-round in drawing, watercolor, painting, printmaking, photography, ceramics, sculpture, jewelry, fiber art, and clay animation, in addition to art travel workshops to domestic and international locations. Nearly 7,000 students enroll each year, filling over 10,000 seats in classes. All classes and workshops are taught by professional artist instructors, many from DC-area colleges and universities. Classes are noncredit and are open to all. After the school's founding in 1967, classes were credited with improving the quality of art in The Art League's Gallery, with Washingtonian Magazine writing, "the single most important thing The Art League has done to improve its image is to recruit a workshop faculty that includes some of the brightest luminaries on the art horizon."

Classes are held in the Torpedo Factory Art Center as well as the Madison Annex building. The Art League closed its Duke Street Annex in September 2012 and moved into an expanded classroom space on Madison Street. As of 2023, the Madison Annex building is slated for redevelopment in 2024. The Art League is currently seeking new spaces to build out classrooms to relocate the school.

== Gallery ==
The Art League Gallery, located on the first floor of the Torpedo Factory Art Center, provides exhibit opportunities to more than 1,000 artists of all media and skill levels. Membership is open to any emerging or professional artist. Exhibits in the gallery rotate on a monthly basis. Each exhibit is juried by an outside professional not associated with The Art League. The Gallery holds approximately 14 member exhibits each year, including both all-media, un-themed exhibits and themed, focused exhibits. The Gallery also presents approximately nine solo artist exhibits each year. The Bin Gallery includes works by artists who have been juried into three or more member exhibits during the previous fiscal year. Special exhibits, events, and collaborations are also periodically featured. The Gallery maintains a library of art and art history books and offers lectures, critiques, juror talks, demonstrations, workshops, and tours.

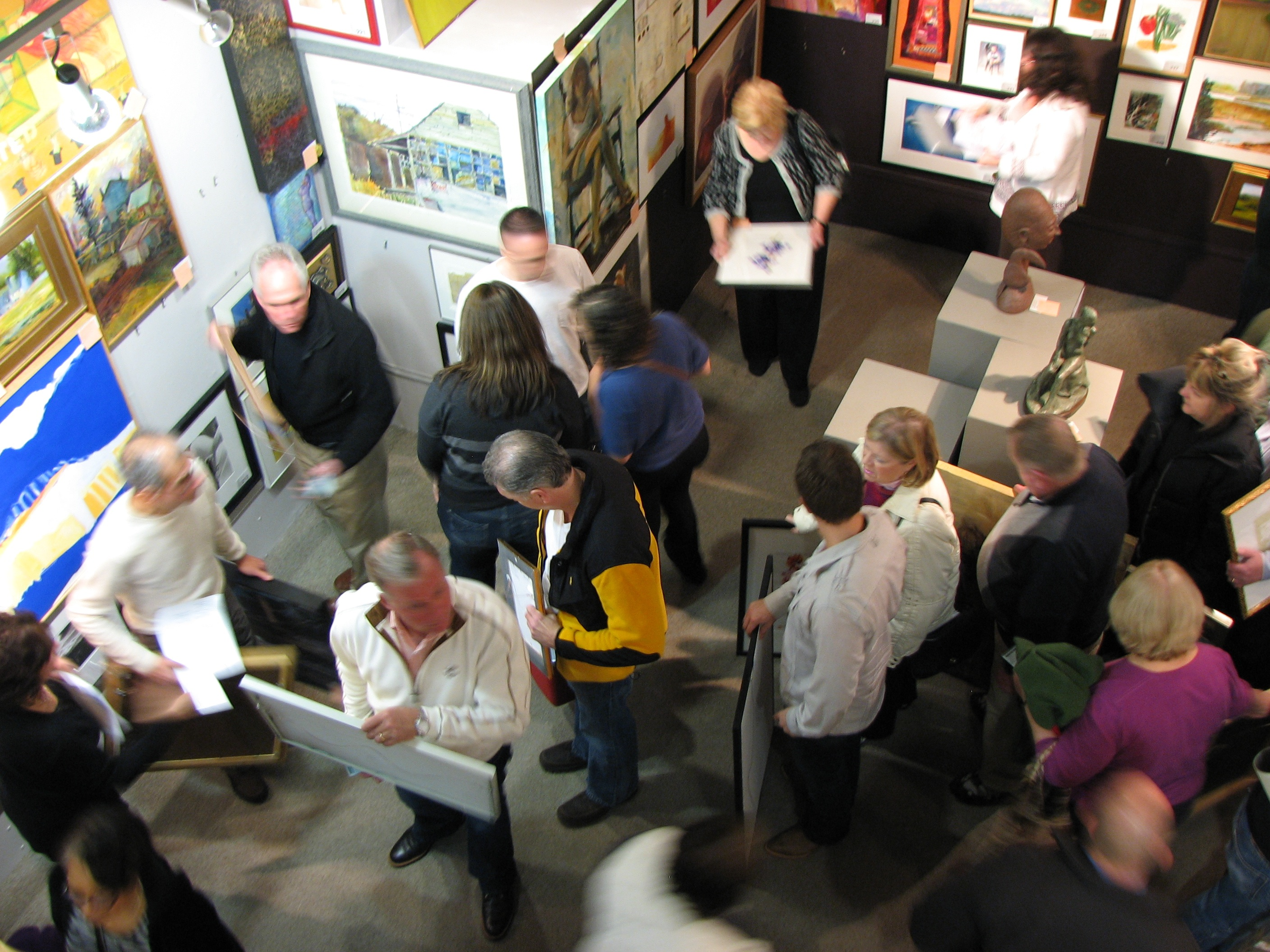
Patrons check out from the 2012 Patrons' Show.

Every winter, Art League members donate original works of art to be raffled off in the annual Patrons' Show Fundraiser, which sells about 600 tickets each year. The art is hung salon-style in the gallery, with ticket-holders selecting a piece when their number is called. The Patrons' Show was named the "Most Fun Art Fundraiser" in the July 2010 issue of Washingtonian Magazine.

== Supply Store ==
The Art League Supply Store is located in the Torpedo Factory Art Center and is staffed by working artists. Art supplies and materials requested by instructors are sold here at a low price.

== Outreach ==
In 2003, in partnership with the Alexandria Court Service Unit, The Art League established a mentoring program for at-risk girls in Alexandria, called A Space Of Her Own (SOHO). The SOHO program engages at-risk, low-income, 5th-grade girls in a year of personal growth centered on art. Each participating girl is paired with an adult, female mentor to partake in art lessons taught by an Art League instructor. These sessions become the catalyst to discuss larger life concerns, decision-making, and emotional issues. At the completion of the program, the teams remodel each of the girls' bedrooms, incorporating all of their artwork, to give each girl a "space of her own.". In 2009, the Presidential Committee on the Arts and Humanities named SOHO a semi-finalist for the Coming Up Taller awards (now National Arts & Humanities Youth Program awards), which recognizes the best after-school programs in the arts and humanities.

The Geri Gordon Scholarship Fund was established in 1998, in honor of former Art League School Director Geri Gordon, to provide scholarships for art classes to students who otherwise could not afford to enroll.
