= Tanya Davis (artist) =

American painter

- Education: Florida State University
- Occupation: Artist
- Style: Hyper-realism
- Board member of: President of the Torpedo Factory Artists' Association
- Website: www.tanyadaviswatercolors.com

Tanya Davis is an American artist (born in Florida) predominantly known for her hyper-realistic representational watercolors which are often on the subject of reflections and transparency. She is a past President of the Torpedo Factory Artists' Association, one of the largest artists associations in the US. In 1999, she was selected as the Torpedo Factory Artist of the Year.

== Education ==
Davis received a Bachelor of Arts: Studio Art, magna cum laude, from Florida State University in 1981, and has been a professional artist since 1990.

== Career ==
Davis is a Signature Member of the National Watercolor Society and the Baltimore Watercolor Society, as well as a Member of the Florida Watercolor Society and the Florida Suncoast Watercolor Society. Her artwork has been recognized for multiple awards including the Holbein Artist Materials Award of Excellence, the Escoda Award of Excellence, and the 2002 Art & Antiques Magazine Award of Excellence.

== Solo shows and selected group shows ==
- 1997 - University of Maryland University College, MD
- 1998 - Northern Virginia Community College, Woodbridge, VA
- 1999 - The Art League, Alexandria, VA
- 2000 - Target Gallery, Alexandria, VA
- 2000 - Spectrum Gallery, Washington, DC 2001 - "Contemporary Realism: A Survey of Washington Area Artists." The Athenaeum, Alexandria, VA
- 2008 - "Trading Spaces." ArtSpace, Raleigh, NC
- 2015 - "9th Annual Keystone National Exhibit." Mechanicsburg Art Center, Mechanicsburg, PA
- 2016 - "45th Annual Florida Watercolor Society Exhibition." Ocala FL
- 2017 - "Florida Watercolor Society 46th Annual Exhibition." Ft Lauderdale, FL
- 2017 - "Wet." Mansion at Strathmore, Rockville, MD
- 2017 - "Mid-Atlantic Regional Watercolor Exhibition" BlackRock Arts Center, Gaithersburg, MD
- 2017 - "Dreams and Recollections." Artists & Makers Studios, Rockville, MD
- 2018 - "Mid-Atlantic Regional Watercolor Exhibition", BlackRock Arts Center, Gaithersburg, MD

== Selected collections ==
- Maryland Artist's Collection, University of Maryland University College
