= USS Hayler =

Spruance-class destroyer

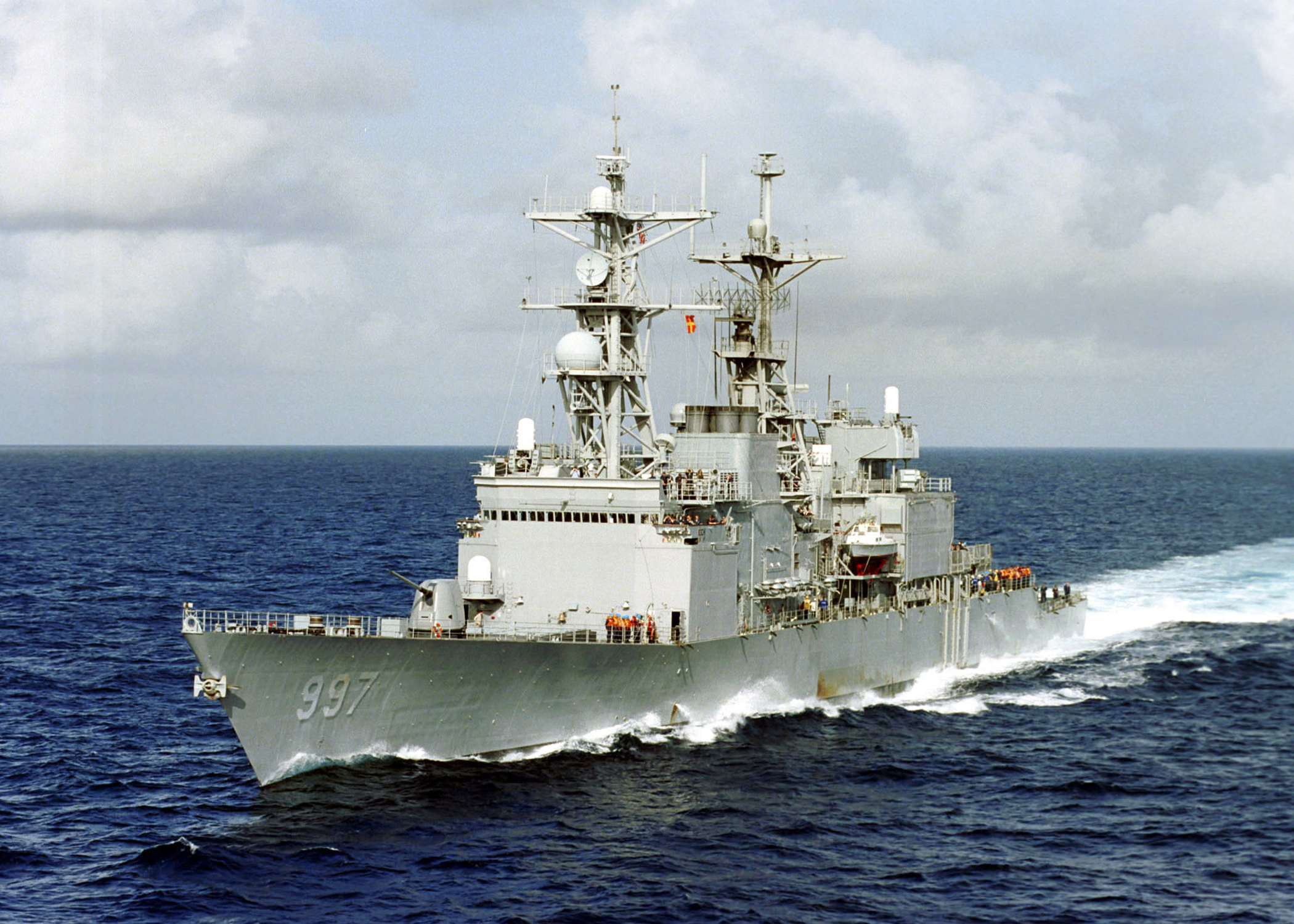
- USS Hayler underway on 18 June 2001

History

United States
- Name: Hayler
- Namesake: Robert W. Hayler
- Ordered: 29 September 1979
- Builder: Ingalls Shipbuilding
- Laid down: 20 October 1980
- Launched: 2 March 1982
- Sponsored by: Margot Hayler and Nicole Hayler
- Acquired: 10 February 1983
- Commissioned: 5 March 1983
- Decommissioned: 25 August 2003
- Stricken: 6 April 2004
- Identification: Callsign: NRWH; Hull number: DD-997
- Motto: Courageous in Conflict
- Fate: Sunk as target, 13 November 2004
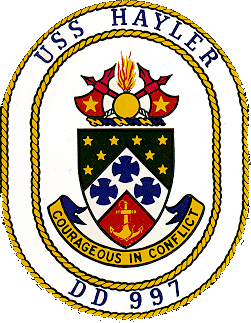
- Badge

General characteristics
- Class & type: Spruance-class destroyer
- Displacement: 8,040 long tons (8,170 t) full load
- Length: 529 ft (161 m) waterline; 563 ft (172 m) overall
- Beam: 55 ft (17 m)
- Draft: 29 ft (8.8 m)
- Installed power: 3 × 501-K17 generator sets (2,000 kW (2,700 hp) each)
- Propulsion: 4 × General Electric LM2500 gas turbines, 2 shafts, 80,000 shp (60 MW)
- Speed: 32.5 knots (60.2 km/h; 37.4 mph)
- Range: 6,000 nmi (11,000 km; 6,900 mi) at 20 knots (37 km/h; 23 mph)
- Complement: 19 officers, 315 enlisted
- Sensors & processing systems: AN/SPS-40 air search radar; AN/SPG-60 fire control radar; AN/SPS-55 surface search radar; AN/SPQ-9 gun fire control radar; Mark 23 TAS automatic detection and tracking radar; AN/SPS-65 missile fire control radar; AN/SQS-53 bow-mounted active sonar; AN/SQR-19 TACTAS towed array passive sonar; Naval Tactical Data System
- Electronic warfare & decoys: AN/SLQ-32 electronic warfare system; AN/SLQ-25 Nixie torpedo countermeasures; Mark 36 SRBOC decoy launching system; AN/SLQ-49 inflatable decoys
- Armament: 2 × 5 in (127 mm) 54 caliber Mark 45 dual purpose guns; 2 × 20 mm Phalanx CIWS Mark 15 guns; 1 × 8 cell ASROC launcher (removed); 1 × 8 cell NATO Sea Sparrow Mark 29 missile launcher; 2 × quadruple Harpoon missile canisters; 2 × Mark 32 triple 12.75 in (324 mm) torpedo tubes (Mk 46 torpedoes); 1 × 61 cell Mk 41 VLS launcher for Tomahawk missiles
- Aircraft carried: 2 × Sikorsky SH-60 Seahawk LAMPS III helicopters
- Aviation facilities: Flight deck and enclosed hangar for up to two medium-lift helicopters
- Extra sensors: AN/SPS-49

USS Hayler (DD-997) was a Spruance-class destroyer that served in the United States Navy from 1983 to 2003. Named for Vice Admiral Robert W. Hayler (1891–1980), she was the last ship of her class.

== Design and construction ==
For fiscal year 1978, Congress authorized the production of two additional Spruance-class destroyers, though they funded only one. These were intended to be built as helicopter destroyers (DDH), provided they would not cost more than a standard Spruance-class. Litton-Ingalls completed sketch design work for DDH-997, which moved the helicopter deck aft, stretching the length of the hangar and displacing the Sea Sparrow launcher to the top of the hangar. The design would have accommodated two SH-3 Sea Kings or four smaller SH-60 Seahawk or SH-2 Seasprite helicopters. While the prospective DDH-997 probably wouldn't have cost much more to build than a standard Spruance-class, the detail design and engineering work required before the ship could be built would have been substantial (similar work for the Kidd-class cost $110.8 million). This raised the cost of the DDH substantially above a standard Spruance-class destroyer. While this additional cost might have been justified if the DDH was going to enter series production, it was difficult to justify for a single ship. Accordingly, the Navy built Hayler to a similar design as the rest of the class, while incorporating some systems from the Ticonderoga Cruiser and Kidd Destroyer designs.

Hayler was laid down on 20 October 1980 by Ingalls Shipbuilding, in Pascagoula, Miss.; launched on 2 March 1982; and commissioned on 5 March 1983.

=== Ship's crest ===
According to the U.S. Navy, Hayler's crest is representative of Vice Admiral Hayler's inspiring leadership, his dedication to his country, his proficiency as a naval officer, and of the history and traditions of the naval service.

The gold stars on the blue background in the upper area of the shield symbolize the many Pacific Island Campaigns Admiral Hayler participated in as a commanding officer, and as a commander of a cruiser division during World War II. The stars also represent the numerous awards he received, some repeated two and three times. The chevron is a symbol of strength and support, and the blue crosses represent the Admirals's three Navy Crosses, an award for valour exceeded only by the Medal of Honor.

The crossed red battle axes are a symbol of strength and resourcefulness under fire, and represent Admiral Hayler's wartime service. The two stars they bear are in recognition of the Silver and Bronze Stars awarded to Admiral Hayler for valour. The bomb represents naval firepower, gunfire support and anti-aircraft fire, and symbolizes the contributions of Admiral Hayler to the development of naval ordnance at the outbreak of World War II.

The anchor refers to the fleet, and Admiral Hayler's efforts toward its strength and safety. The predominant colors, red, white, and blue, are representative of the national flag, and Admiral Hayler's patriotism and loyalty to the flag and the nation it represents.

The ship's motto "Courageous in Conflict" It refers to Vice Admiral Hayler and use by crew members of the USS Hayler.

== Service history ==
On 23 October 1988, Hayler was in collision with the West German replenishment tanker Rhön. Hayler was badly damaged aft, and was under repair at Rosyth Dockyard, Scotland, until 20 November.

The ship was assigned escort duties for the USS La Moure County (LST-1194) as it accidentally ran aground near the coast of Caleta Cifuncho Bay, Chile in the pre-dawn hours of 12 September 2000 during a routine amphibious training operation with a sister vessel, the Chilean Valdiva.

=== Fate ===
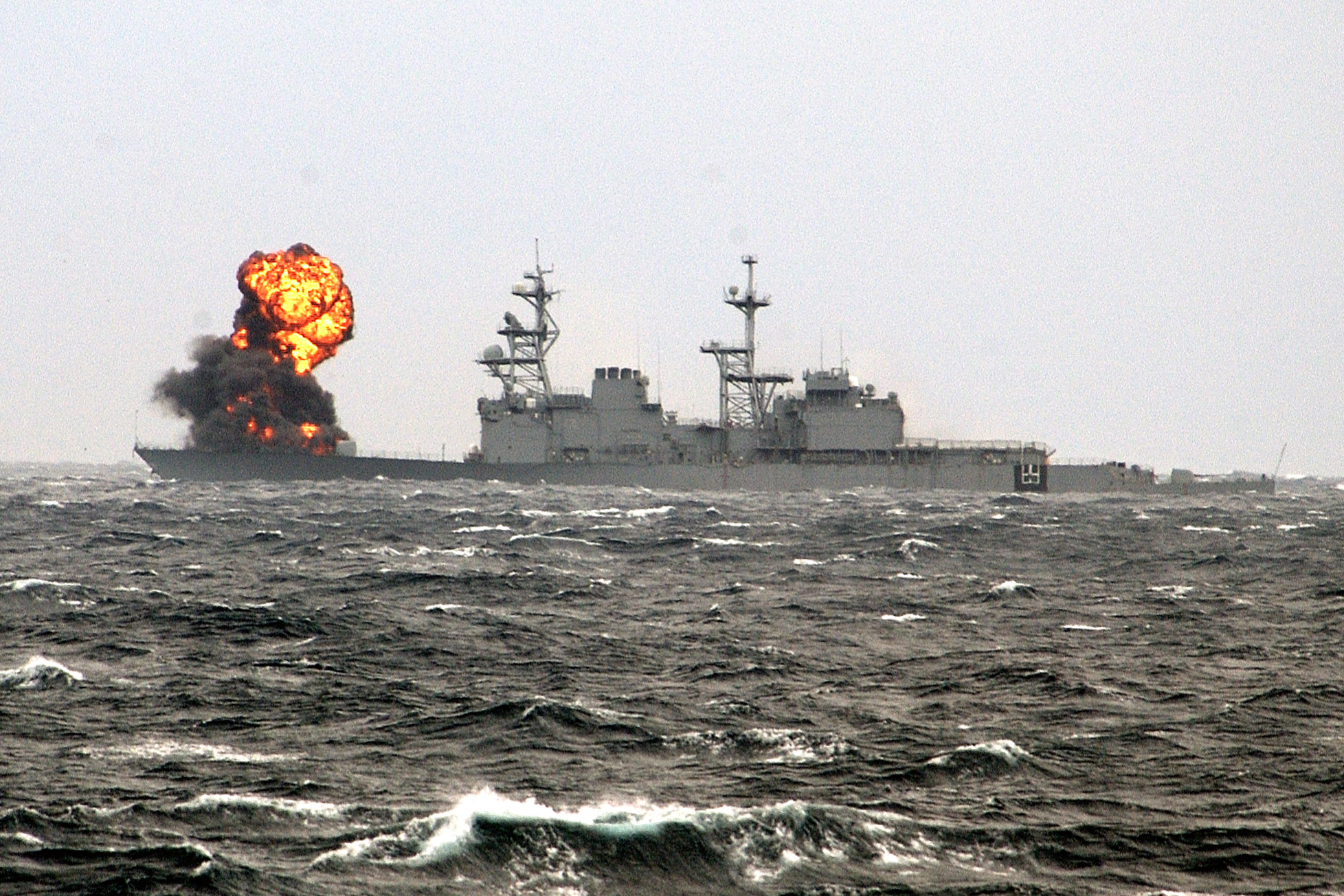
Hayler (DD-997) U.S. Navy EOD rigged ship to sink. Fuel storage drums, bow and starboard mid-ship, destroyed for effect before sinking.

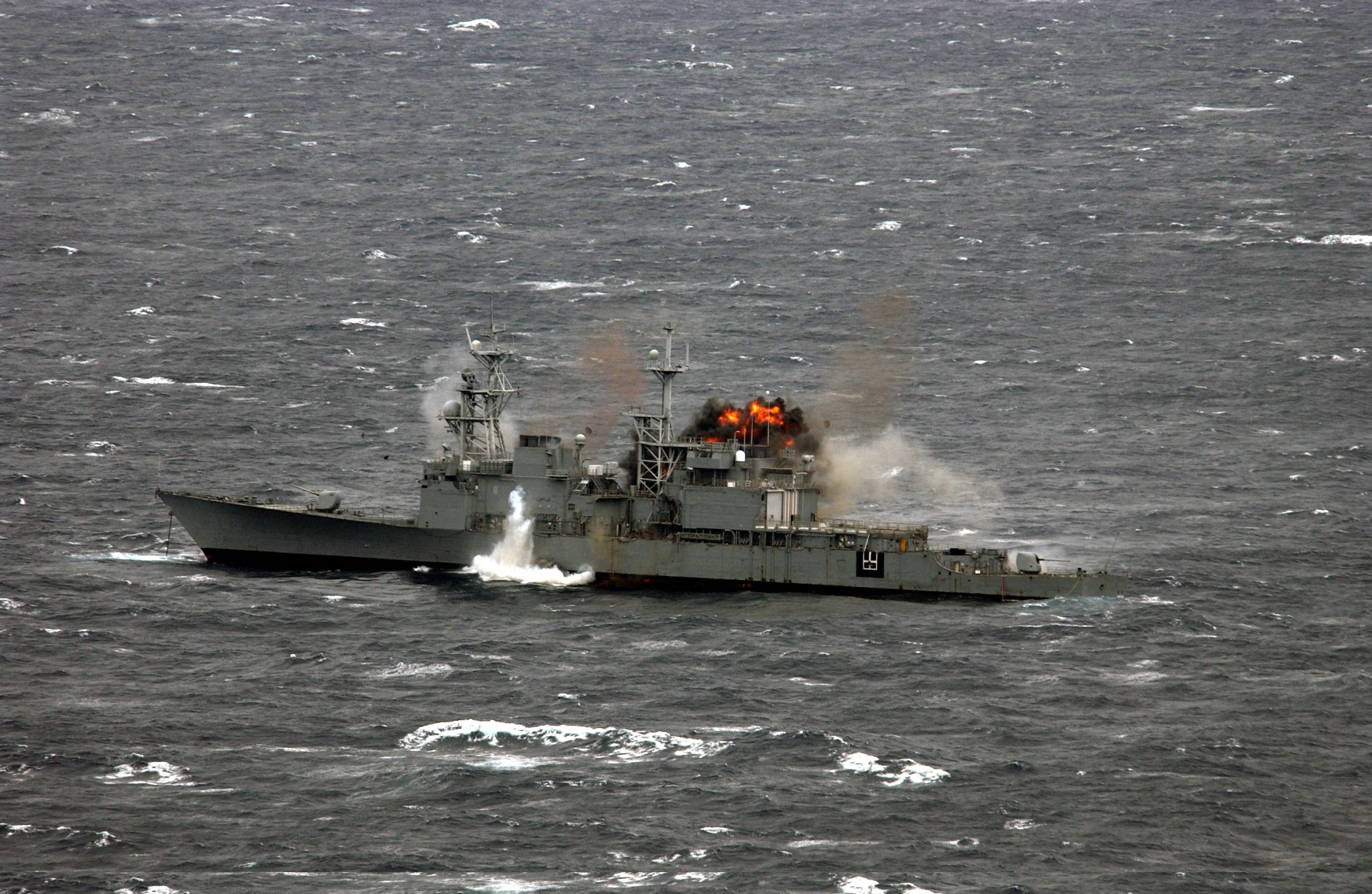
The end of ex-USS Hayler, 13 November 2004.

Hayler was decommissioned 25 August 2003 at Norfolk Naval Shipyard, Portsmouth, Va. She was stricken from the Naval Vessel Register on 6 April 2004 and sunk as a target on 13 November 2004, during the 2004 Sink Exercise.

== Gallery ==
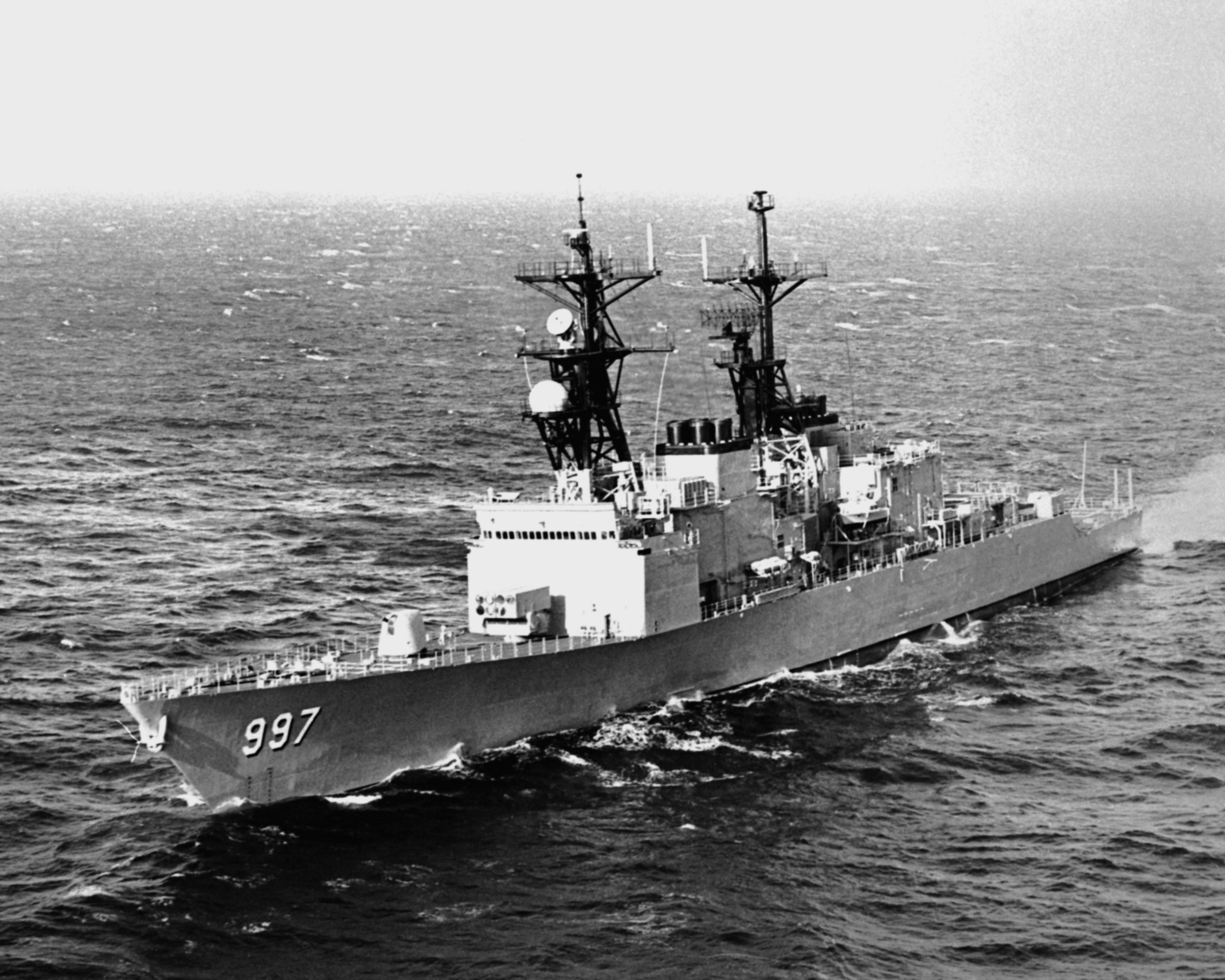
USS Hayler on 15 November 1982

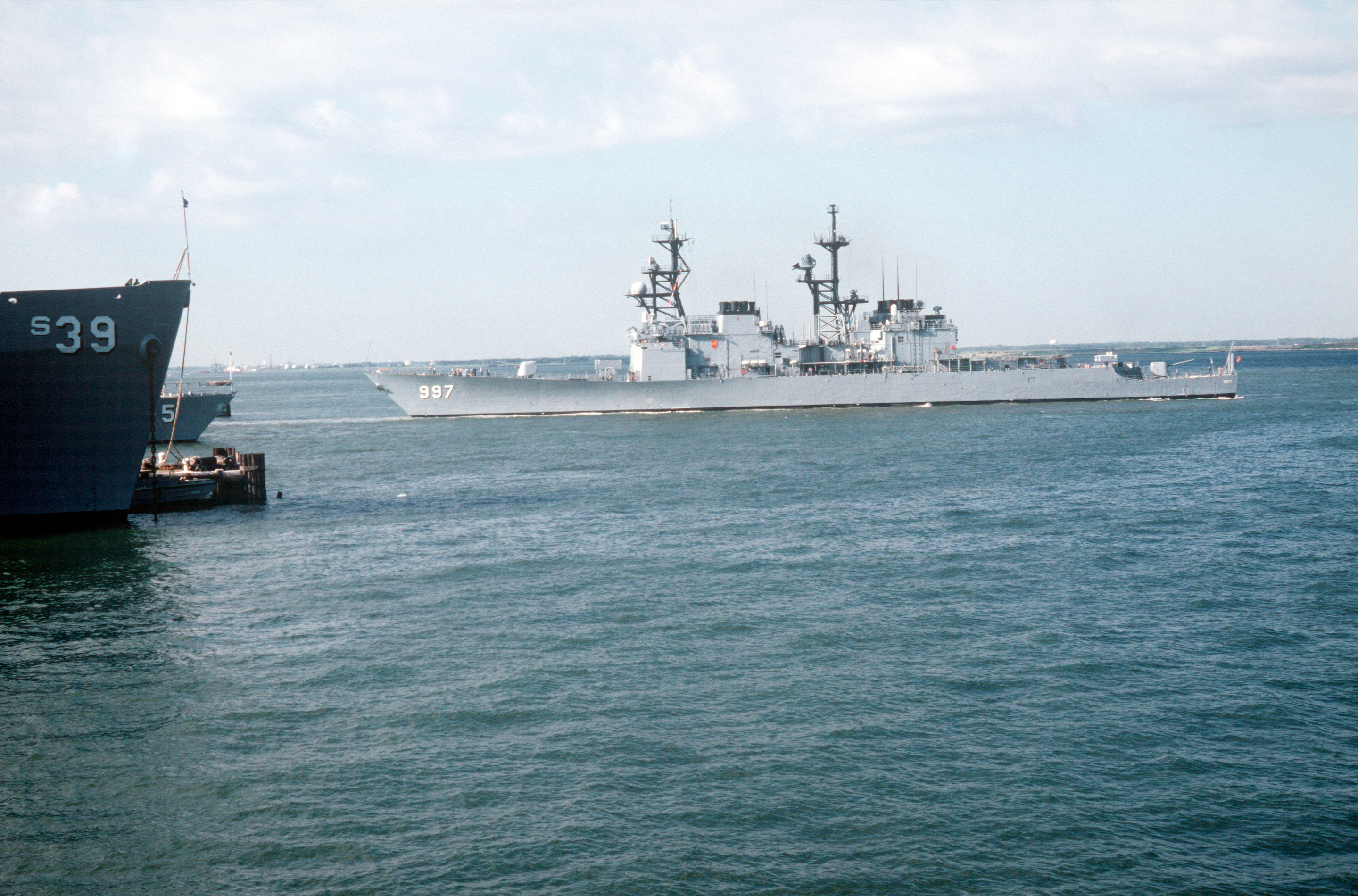
USS Hayler on 1 July 1986

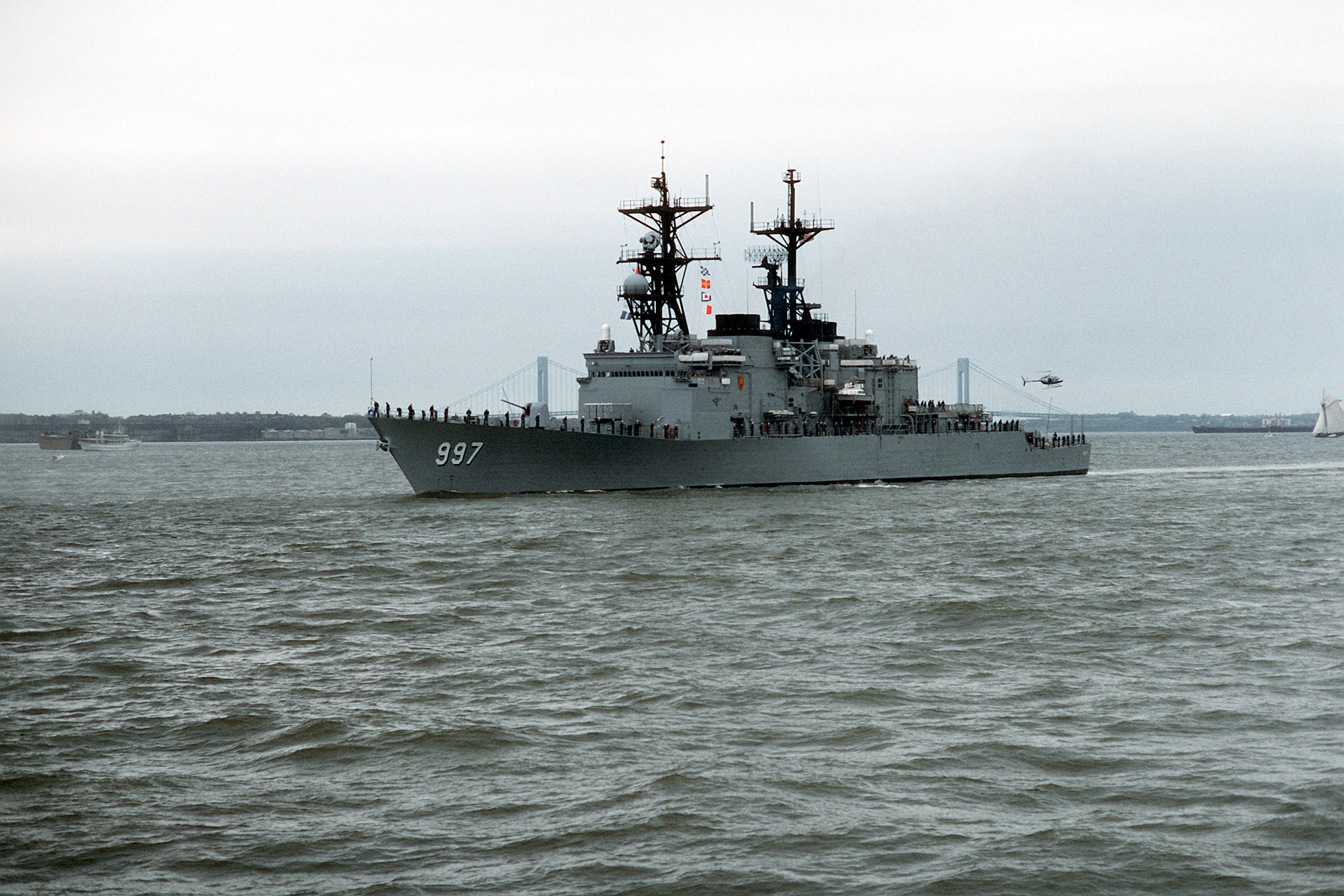
USS Hayler on 29 April 1989

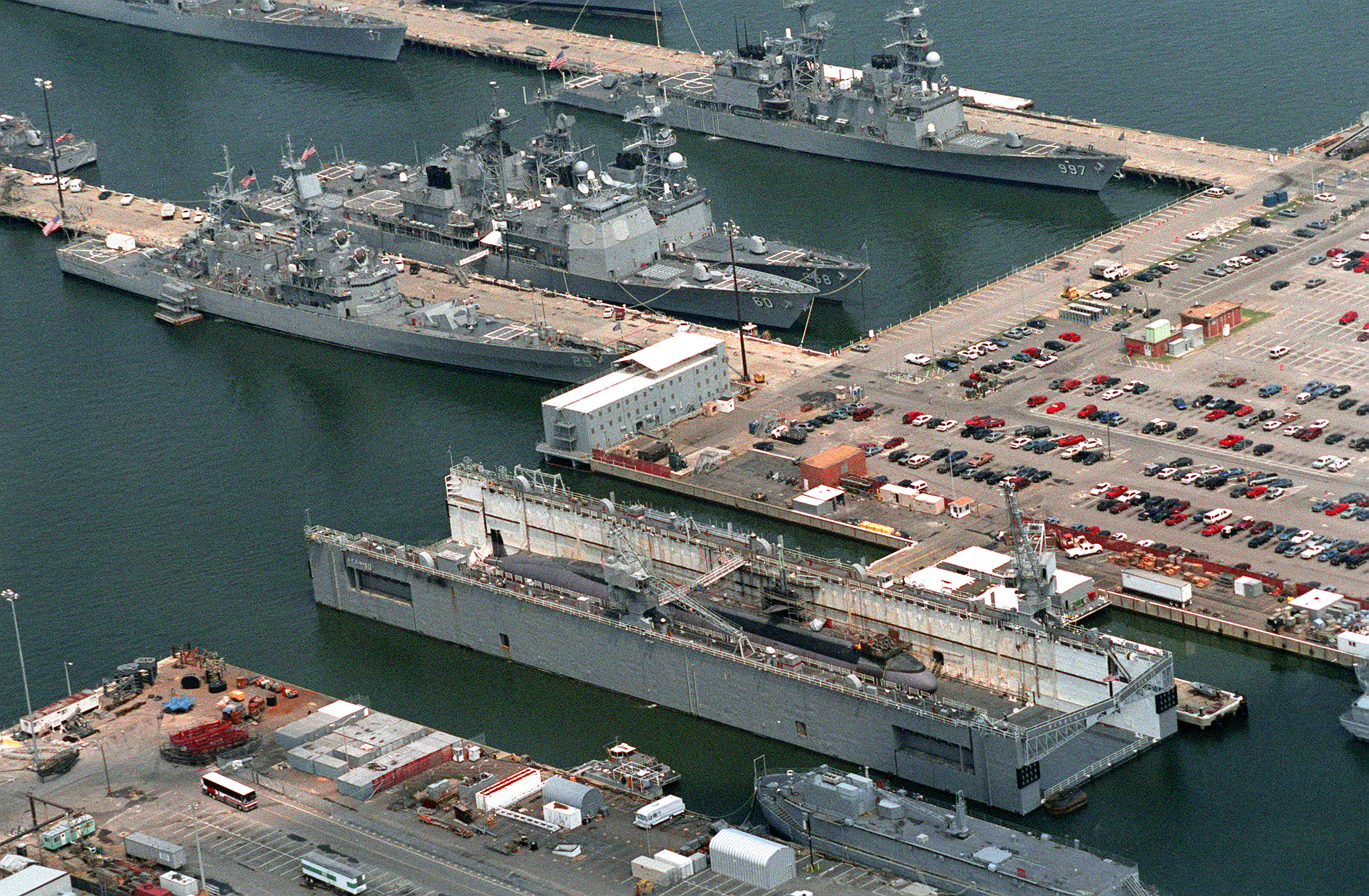
USS Hayler on 25 June 1995

== See also ==
- List of destroyers of the United States Navy
