= David L. Englin =

American politician

Member of the Virginia House of Delegates from the 45th district
- In office January 11, 2006 – August 31, 2012
- Preceded by: Marian Van Landingham
- Succeeded by: Rob Krupicka

Personal details
- Born: August 15, 1974 (age 52) Frankfurt, Germany
- Party: Democratic
- Spouse: Shayna Beth Englin (m. 1996)
- Education: United States Air Force Academy; John F. Kennedy School of Government
- Occupation: Nonprofit executive

Military service
- Branch/service: United States Air Force
- Years of service: 1992–2004

David Lawrence Englin (born August 15, 1974) was a state legislator in the Virginia House of Delegates through the 2012 session, and is the Interim Chief Executive Officer for the American Red Cross Los Angeles Region.

== Political career ==
A Democrat, he was elected to the Virginia House of Delegates in November 2005. From 2006 to 2012 he represented the 45th district, made up of parts of Arlington and Fairfax Counties and the city of Alexandria. He served on the Agriculture Chesapeake and Natural Resources, Finance, Health Welfare and Institutions, and Privileges and Elections Committees during his tenure. Englin resigned his seat in the Virginia House effective August 31, 2012 after admitting to having had an extramarital affair.

== Private Sector ==
In 2012, Englin joined BizFed, the Los Angeles County Business Federation. He was initially the Director of Advocacy and Communications, later being promoted to Executive Vice President. BizFed is an advocacy organization made up of 155 direct members, and representing more than 275,000 employers throughout Southern California.

As the Chief Operating Officer for the American Red Cross Los Angeles Region, he leads human resources, finance, facilities, fleet, and other operational support for Red Cross humanitarian services, serving nearly 10 million people in 88 cities throughout Los Angeles County, as well as the people of Inyo and Mono Counties and the eastern third of Kern County. The organisation engages in disaster preparedness and response. He is responsible for service to the local Armed Forces and Veterans as well as for local contributions to international services (and missions). Among key work is creating preparedness in vulnerable communities.

== Personal life ==
Englin is an Eagle Scout and a graduate of the United States Air Force Academy and Harvard University's John F. Kennedy School of Government.
