= USS Howard (DD-179) =

Wickes-class destroyer

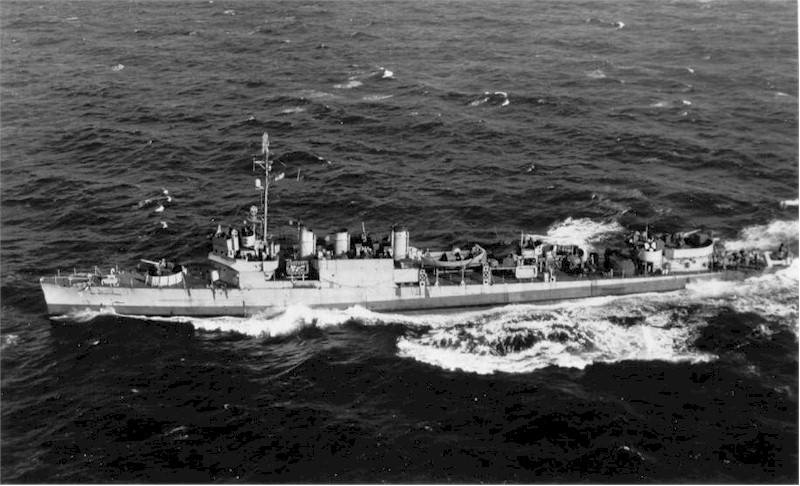
- USS Howard underway

History

United States
- Name: Howard
- Namesake: Charles W. Howard
- Builder: Union Iron Works, San Francisco, California
- Laid down: 9 December 1918
- Launched: 26 April 1919
- Commissioned: 29 January 1920
- Decommissioned: 27 May 1922
- Identification: DD-179
- Recommissioned: 29 August 1940
- Decommissioned: 11 October 1945
- Reclassified: DMS-7, 1940
- Stricken: 19 December 1945
- Fate: Sold for scrapping, 14 June 1946

General characteristics
- Class & type: Wickes-class destroyer
- Displacement: 1,060 tons
- Length: 314 ft 5 in (95.8 m)
- Beam: 31 ft 8 in (9.7 m)
- Draft: 8 ft 6 in (2.6 m)
- Speed: 35 knots (65 km/h)
- Complement: 101 officers and enlisted
- Armament: 4 × 4 in (102 mm)/50 guns; 2 × 3 in (76 mm)/23 guns; 12 × 21 in (533 mm) torpedo tubes

USS Howard (DD–179), (DMS-7) was a Wickes-class destroyer in the United States Navy during World War II. She was named for Charles W. Howard, who was killed in the American Civil War aboard USS New Ironsides.

Howard was launched by Union Iron Works San Francisco, California on 26 April 1919, sponsored by Marion Filmer. The destroyer was commissioned on 29 January 1920 at Mare Island.

== Namesake ==
Charles W. Howard volunteered for service in the U.S. Navy during the American Civil War, being appointed mate in October 1862. As acting ensign, he served on board USS New Ironsides and was in charge of the deck when that ship was attacked by Confederate torpedo boat CSS David in Charleston Harbor, on the night of 5 October 1863. Mounting the rail, he ordered the sentries to fire on the approaching enemy, and while exposed he received a mortal wound. He died five days later and was honored by being appointed acting master after his death "for gallant conduct in face of the enemy."

== Service history ==
Howard departed San Francisco on 1 March 1920 to join the Pacific Destroyer force at San Diego, California. After initial tactical maneuvers and gunnery training, she departed San Diego on 3 May for Topolobampo, Mexico. She rejoined her destroyer flotilla on 17 May to participate in intensive and prolonged operations in the San Diego area, including torpedo practice, patrol, battle practices, and exercises with submarines. Robert W. Hayler was commanding officer of Howard from 5 July 1921 until the ship decommissioned on 27 May 1922.

=== Classified DMS-7 ===
Recommissioned 29 August 1940, Howard was converted to a minesweeper and reclassified DMS-7. She sailed from San Diego in mid-October, arrived at Norfolk, Virginia, on 29 October, and proceeded on 19 November for duty in the Caribbean Sea. She remained there until 17 May 1941 conducting minesweeping assignments and patrol duty enforcing the Neutrality Act. Howard returned to Norfolk on 19 May and participated in exercises along the Chesapeake Bay until the Japanese attack on Pearl Harbor on 7 December 1941 plunged the United States into World War II.

=== World War II ===
Howard was underway on 8 December on escort duty, and in the months that followed, convoyed transports and tankers in the Caribbean and western Atlantic, keeping supply lanes open despite German U-boats. Plans called for an invasion of North Africa in 1942, a massive and hazardous amphibious operation projected across thousands of miles of ocean. In October, Howard joined Admiral Hewitt's Western Naval Task Force at Norfolk. She sailed on 24 October and screened the cruiser Augusta during the Atlantic crossing. As troops landed on 8 November she performed both minesweeping and screening duties. During the first phase of the Naval Battle of Casablanca that day, Howard screened Augusta as the cruiser engaged shore batteries and dueled with the French battleship Jean Bart. The destroyer then remained off Casablanca and Safi while the American soldiers consolidated their beachheads and moored with naval units at Casablanca on 16 November 1942. After performing anti-submarine patrol duties she returned to Norfolk on 29 December.

During most of 1943, Howard plied the convoy lanes of the Atlantic and Caribbean protecting Allied ships from submarine and air attack. She steamed to the West Indies, Panama, Newfoundland, and Iceland on this duty, a key part of which was protecting the oil tankers vital to the conduct of the war.

As the tempo of operations against Japan increased, Howard was transferred to the western Pacific theater, sailing from Norfolk on 21 November 1943, and arriving at San Diego on 7 December. After repairs and training, the ship sailed on 25 March, escorting ships to Pearl Harbor and Majuro. She screened a returning convoy to Pearl Harbor, arriving there on 24 April, and there began preparations for the gigantic invasion of the Marianas. Joining Admiral Richmond Turner's amphibious task force, Howard sortied on 29 May and arrived off Saipan via Eniwetok on 13 June. The ship swept minefields during the day and conducted patrol and harassing fire by night until the landings on 15 June. Howard then was assigned to screen transports, and made two shuttle voyages to Eniwetok and back to the Marianas before returning to Pearl Harbor on 10 August 1944.

Howard's next operation was the invasion of the Philippines, slated for October on the island of Leyte. Following training in the Hawaiian Islands she arrived at Eniwetok on 24 September, and steamed to Leyte Gulf on 17 October. Once more she carried out minesweeping duties, clearing paths in Surigao Strait and Leyte Gulf, despite heavy weather. Her task completed, she departed on 24 October for Manus with the invasion underway and during the first phase of the battle for Leyte Gulf, which ended in a victory for the U.S. Navy.

Training operations in the Admiralties occupied the ship for the next two months, but she sailed again from Manus on 23 December to take part in the next phase of the Philippines operation, the invasion of Luzon. She rendezvoused at Leyte Gulf on 30 December, and departed in convoy for Lingayen Gulf on 2 January 1945. During this voyage through the Philippines, the Japanese made kamikaze attacks, with Howard shooting one attacker down and assisting in destroying many others. The invasion force arrived on 6 January. The minesweepers began their work under almost constant air attack; and, by the time troops landed on 9 January three of Howard's sister ships had been lost. The invasion was successful and the veteran minesweepers departed to arrive in Leyte Gulf on 15 January 1945 and Ulithi on 5 February.

As the American advance moved ever closer to Japan, Howard sailed from Tinian on 13 February with the invasion force for Iwo Jima. Assuming her customary role in advance of the landings, she commenced exploratory sweeps off the island on 16 February, fighting off numerous air attacks. After the assault 19 February the ship acted as a screening ship, arriving at Saipan on 2 March. Following another period of screening duty off Iwo Jima later in March, Howard arrived at Pearl Harbor via Guam on 4 April 1945.

Newer ships now took the 25-year-old ship's duty on the front lines. Reclassified AG-106 on 5 June 1945, she escorted submarines in Hawaiian waters and acted as plane guard for carrier operations before sailing for the United States on 2 October. Transiting the Panama Canal, Howard arrived at Philadelphia, Pennsylvania, on 2 November and decommissioned there on 30 November 1945. In 1946, Howard was sold to Northern Metals Company of Philadelphia, Pennsylvania, and scrapped.

== Awards ==
Howard received six battle stars for World War II service.
