= Marian Van Landingham =

American politician (1937–2026)

Marian A. Van Landingham

Member of the Virginia House of Delegates from the 45th district
- In office January 12, 1983 – January 11, 2006
- Preceded by: Richard M. Bagley
- Succeeded by: David L. Englin

Personal details
- Born: September 10, 1937 Albany, Georgia, U.S.
- Died: April 4, 2026 (aged 88) Alexandria, Virginia, U.S.
- Party: Democratic
- Occupation: Artist; Community leader
- Known for: Creation of the Torpedo Factory Art Center

Marian Amelia Van Landingham (September 10, 1937 – April 4, 2026) was an American artist, community leader and Democratic politician. She served in the Virginia House of Delegates for 24 years and spearheaded the transformation of a former military warehouse into the Torpedo Factory Art Center, in Alexandria, Virginia. In 2006 she was designated a Women's History Month Honoree by the National Women's History Project.

== Early life and education ==
Marian Van Landingham was born in Albany, Georgia and graduated from Druid Hills High School in Atlanta in 1955. She received her Bachelor of Arts and Master of Arts in political science at Emory University.

== Career ==
In 1967 Landingham moved to Arlington County, Virginia to work as an information specialist for the National Air Pollution Agency before moving to nearby Alexandria, Virginia four years later. She worked part time for Alexandria's Bicentennial office, and by 1973 was the president of the Alexandria Arts League, as discussed below. She also worked with Georgia Congressman Phil Landrum. A painter herself, she continued to live and work in Alexandria, for more than five decades, accompanied in her final years by two dachshunds, which she named "Arthur" for former President Chester A. Arthur , and "Alexander" for the historic city. A member of a local Methodist church, the educational Delta Kappa Gamma society and numerous local neighborhood associations, Landingham would also serve as vice chairman of the Alexandria Democratic Committee.

=== Torpedo Factory and Volunteer Bureau ===
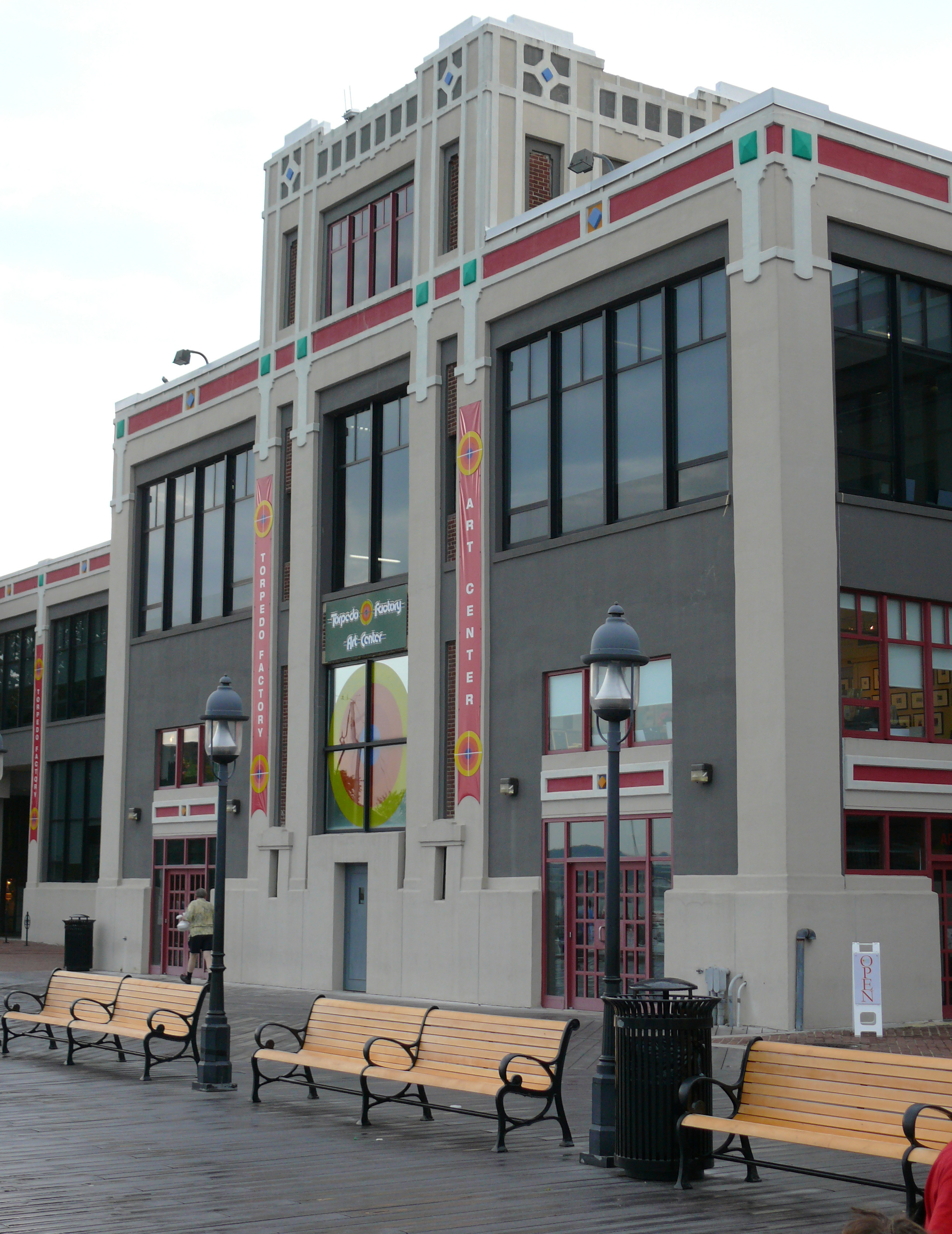
The Torpedo Factory Art Center

In 1973 Alexandria's historic waterfront had several derelict buildings which developers proposed to raze. Van Landingham proposed that a 20th-century, "leaky, drafty, pigeon infested" former military factory, be transformed into an artist studio space and art center. The space would also provide regional artists an affordable option to the overpriced rental spaces of the area.

Van Landingham served as the volunteer president for Alexandria's Art League, and convinced the city's Bicentennial Commission to grant $140,000 for the renovation. Artists volunteered sweat equity, cleaning out the building and creating studio spaces. The Torpedo Factory Art Center opened in 1974 with 140 artists. The Factory's renovation also helped trigger the revitalization of the city's waterfront along the Potomac River, housing 150 artists. By 2017, the art center had become the city's top tourist attraction. It also inspired artist-centric facilities in former government factories in the United States and other countries.

In 1980 Landringham established the Alexandria Volunteer Bureau, now known as Volunteer Alexandria.

=== Politician ===
The Torpedo Factory Art Center had become Van Landingham's first political campaign, launching her political career in the Virginia House of Delegates, where she served parts of Alexandria, Arlington and Fairfax. In 1982 she defeated former Alexandria City Councilman David Speck to become a delegate (a part-time position). She supported education and community based programs in the legislature, including teaching English as a second language, reducing class sizes and funding public schools with money from the lottery, as well as funding for the handicapped, homeless, and for poor families to obtain child care. Van Landingham became the first woman to chair the Privileges and Elections Committee, and also served as chair of the transportation and public education subcommittees. In December 2004, she was diagnosed with cancer, which led to her retirement in 2005. She left as Virginia's most senior female delegate and the 11th most senior member of the house. Mark Warner, who then served as Governor of Virginia, described her work in the house as being "the voice that would step up and argue for what was right," in a conservative legislature, "even those that didn't agree with her views had a great respect for her."

Van Landingham was an elector for Barack Obama and Joe Biden in the 2008 U.S. presidential election.

== Death and legacy ==
Landingham died at her home in Alexandria, Virginia on April 4, 2026, aged 88.

=== Notable awards ===
- 1974; Washingtonian of the Year
- 1979; Virginia Governor Award for the Arts
- 1992; Governor's Award for Fighting Drugs
- 1993; Virginia Interfaith Center for Public Policy Legislator of the Year
- 2006; Women's History Month Honoree
- 2010; Virginia Women in History honoree, Library of Virginia
