= Torpedo Factory Art Center =

Art center in Alexandria, Virginia

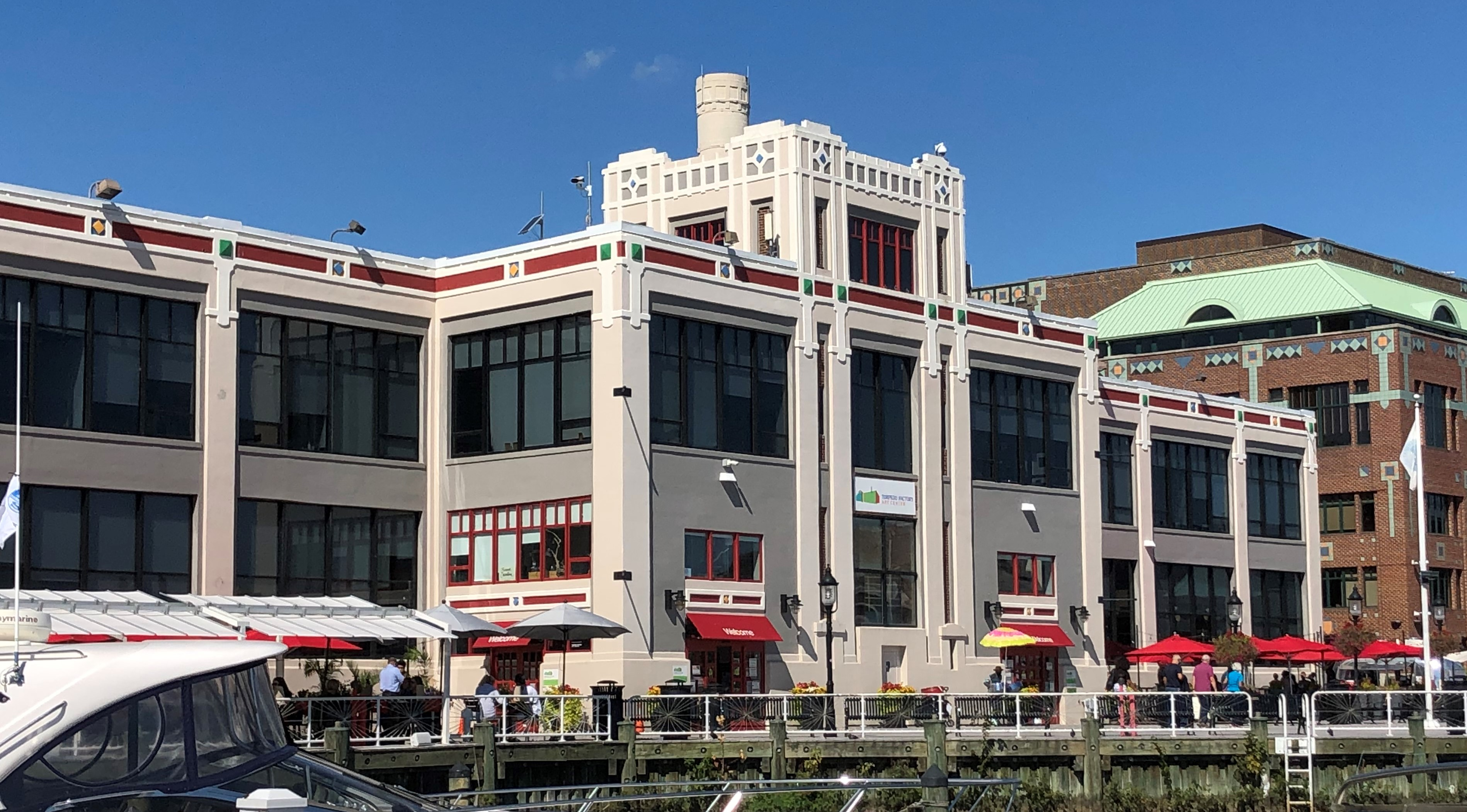
- Established: 1974
- Location: Old Town Alexandria, Virginia, U.S.
- Coordinates: 38.8049°N 77.0398°W
- Type: Art center
- Public transit access: Washington Metro at King Street–Old Town
- Website: torpedofactory.org

The Torpedo Factory Art Center is the former U.S. Naval Torpedo Station, a naval munitions factory on the banks of the Potomac River in Old Town, Alexandria, Virginia, which was converted into an art center in 1974. The facility is located at 105 North Union Street, near the eastern end of King Street.

The Torpedo Factory Art Center is home to the largest number of publicly accessible working artist studios in the United States. Each year, more than a half-million visitors interact with its community of artists. As of March 2022, it housed 82 artists' studios, eight galleries, and workshops, with some 165 professional visual artists who work in a variety of media, including painting, ceramics, photography, jewelry, stained glass, fiber, printmaking, and sculpture. The Torpedo Factory has become a model of creative placemaking for other communities.

Artists are selected as part of an annual jury and re-jury process. Once accepted, they receive a three-year lease of publicly subsidized rent.

== History ==
After months of planning, on November 12, 1918—ironically the day after Armistice Day marked the end of World War I—the U.S. Navy began construction of the U.S. Naval Torpedo Station. The factory built torpedoes for five years before becoming munitions storage. With the onset of World War II, the factory produced Mark III torpedoes for aircraft and Mark XIV torpedoes for submarines.

By the war's end in 1945, the complex was converted to government storage for things such as congressional documents, artifacts from the Smithsonian, and Nazi trial records. The City of Alexandria eventually bought the building in 1969.

In 1974, Marian Van Landingham, as president of The Art League, proposed a project to renovate part of the factory into studio spaces for the Alexandria Bicentennial Project. The project was originally approved for only three years. Large-scale renovation began in May 1974 and the new center formally opened on September 15, 1974. From 1982 to 1983, the building underwent further renovation in compliance with the City's waterfront development plan and was entirely gutted and rebuilt with a new ventilation system and central heating. It formally reopened on May 20, 1983. Adjacent industrial facilities were demolished to build the Torpedo Factory Condominiums in 1985.

The Torpedo Factory Artists Association created by artists and The Art League, managed the center for 12 years, from 1998 to 2010. From 2011 to 2016, it was managed by the specially created Torpedo Factory Art Center Board nonprofit. The Torpedo Factory Artists’ Association is the Torpedo Factory's professional artist community of more than 275 juried visual artists. Past presidents include Tanya Davis, and other artists, and the current president is artist Rachel Kerwin.

In 2018, the City of Alexandria took control of all operations of the Torpedo Factory, despite opposition from some artists. In August 2019, one of the galleries was named after Marian Van Landingham. In October 2021, city authorities started to consider different options for funding renovations.

== Gallery ==
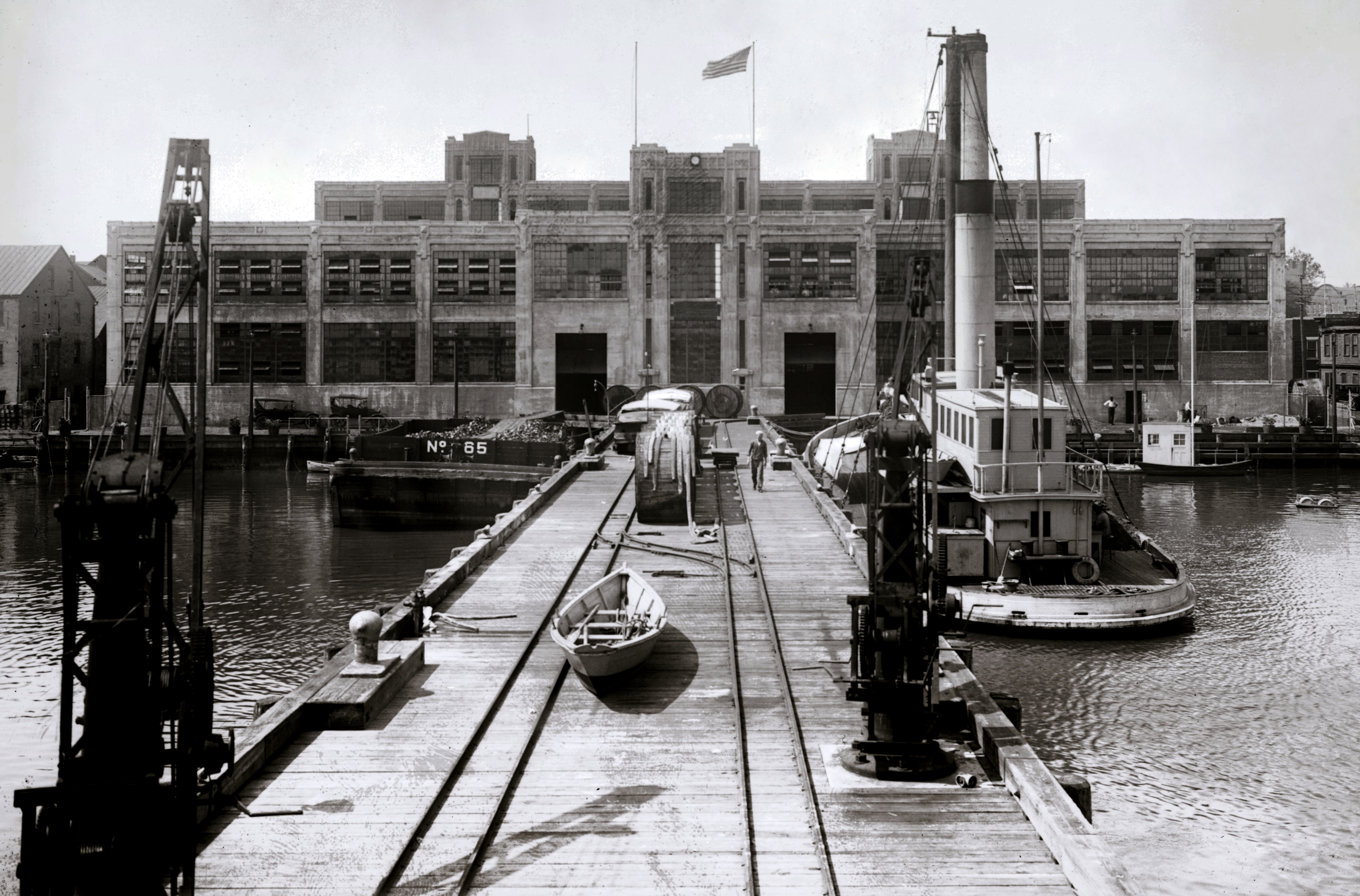
The U.S. Naval Torpedo Station in 1922

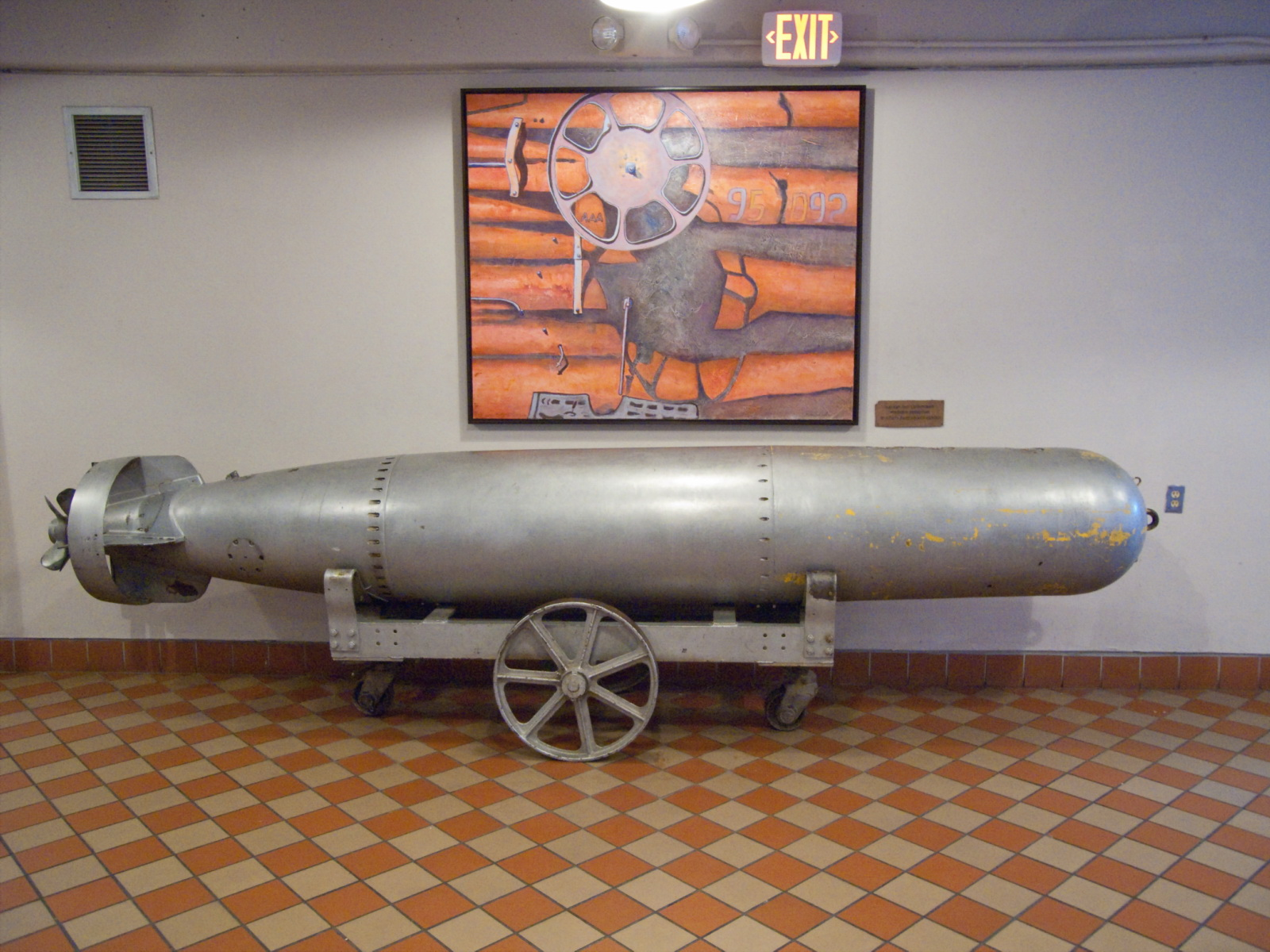
A Mark 35 torpedo on display inside the Center

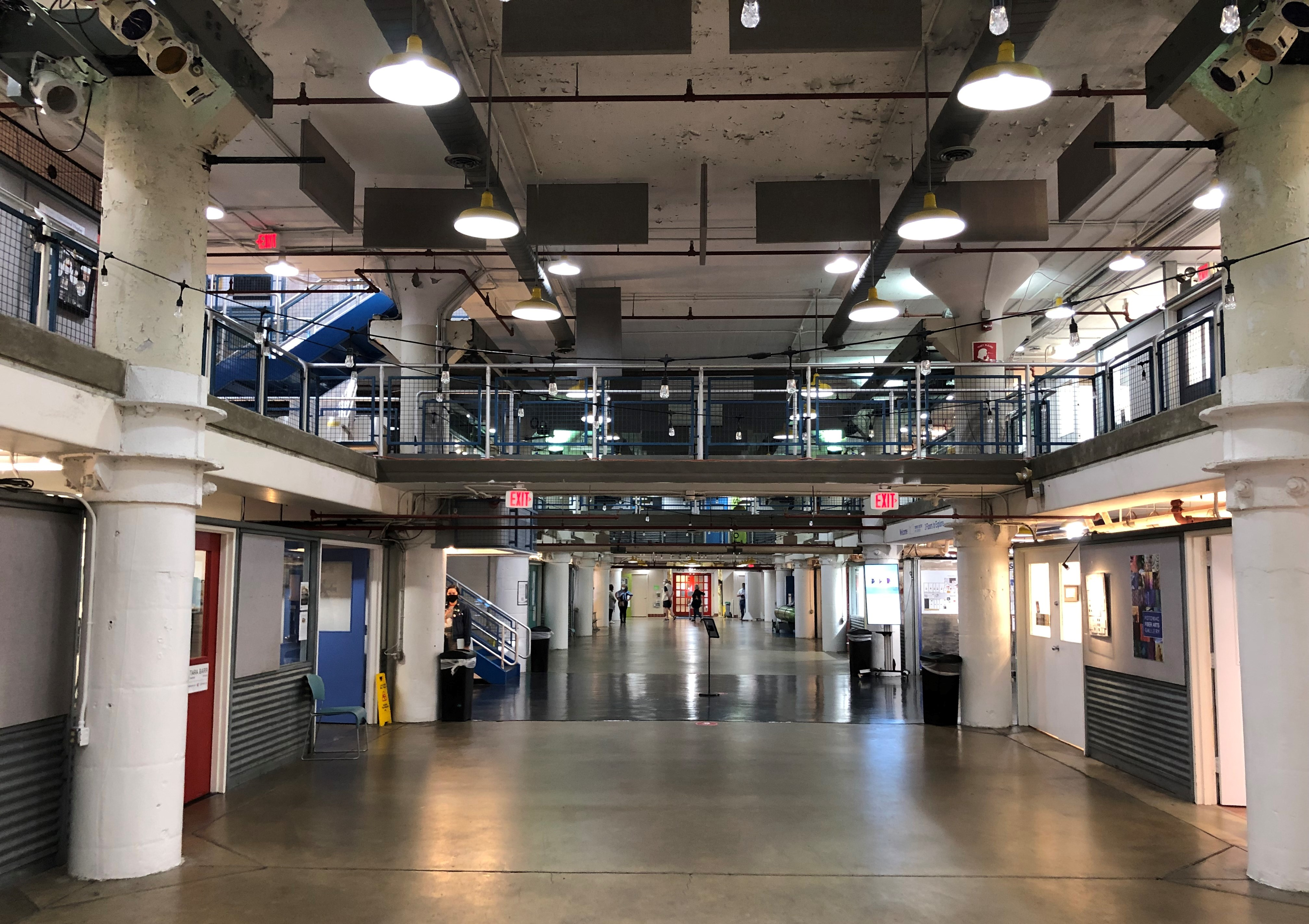
A view of the Art Center's interior

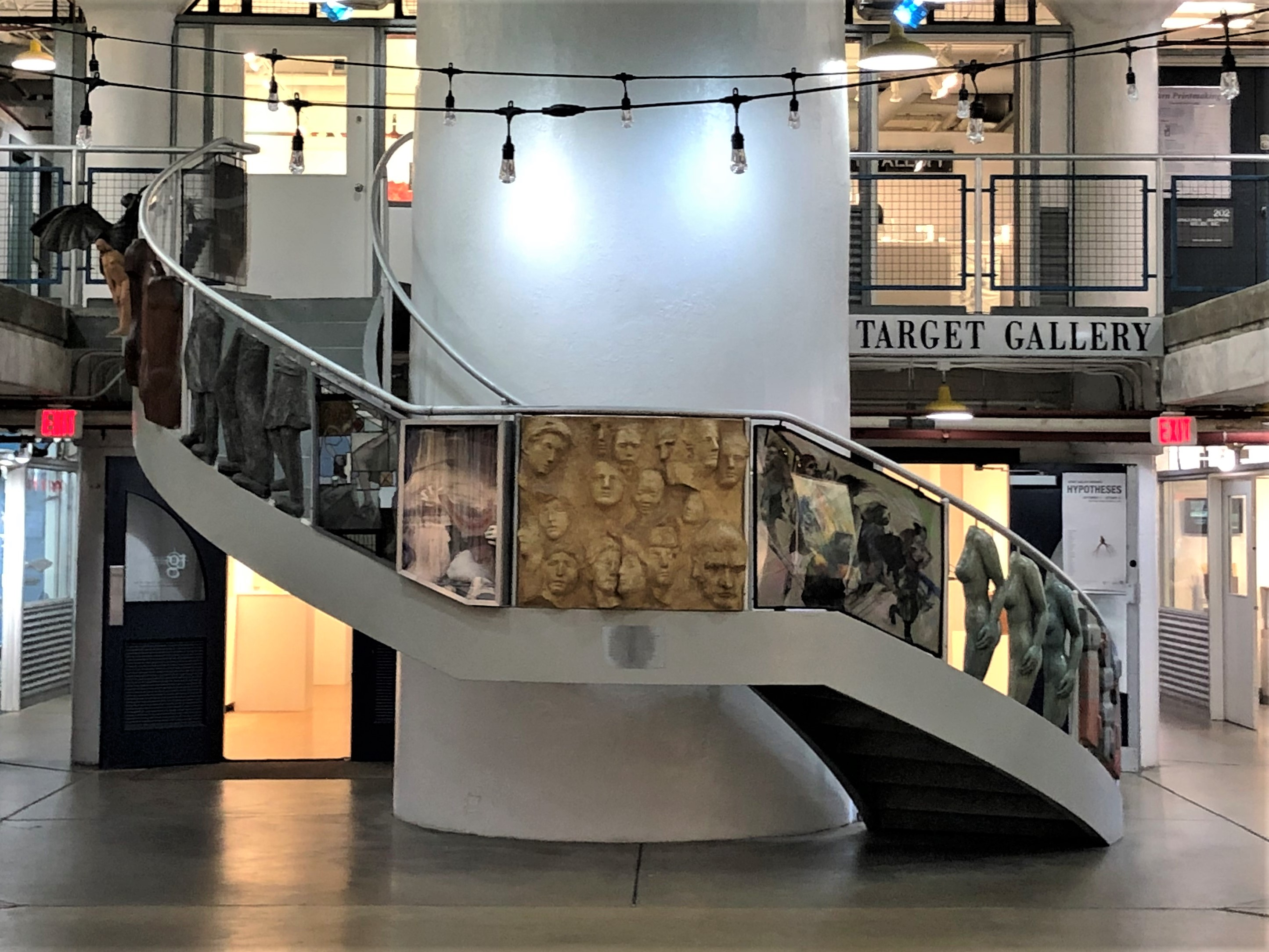
A staircase inside the Center
