= Waynewood =

Coordinates: 38°43′34″N 77°2′56″W

Waynewood is a populated place in Fairfax County, Virginia, United States. It is located on the Potomac River and the George Washington Memorial Parkway.

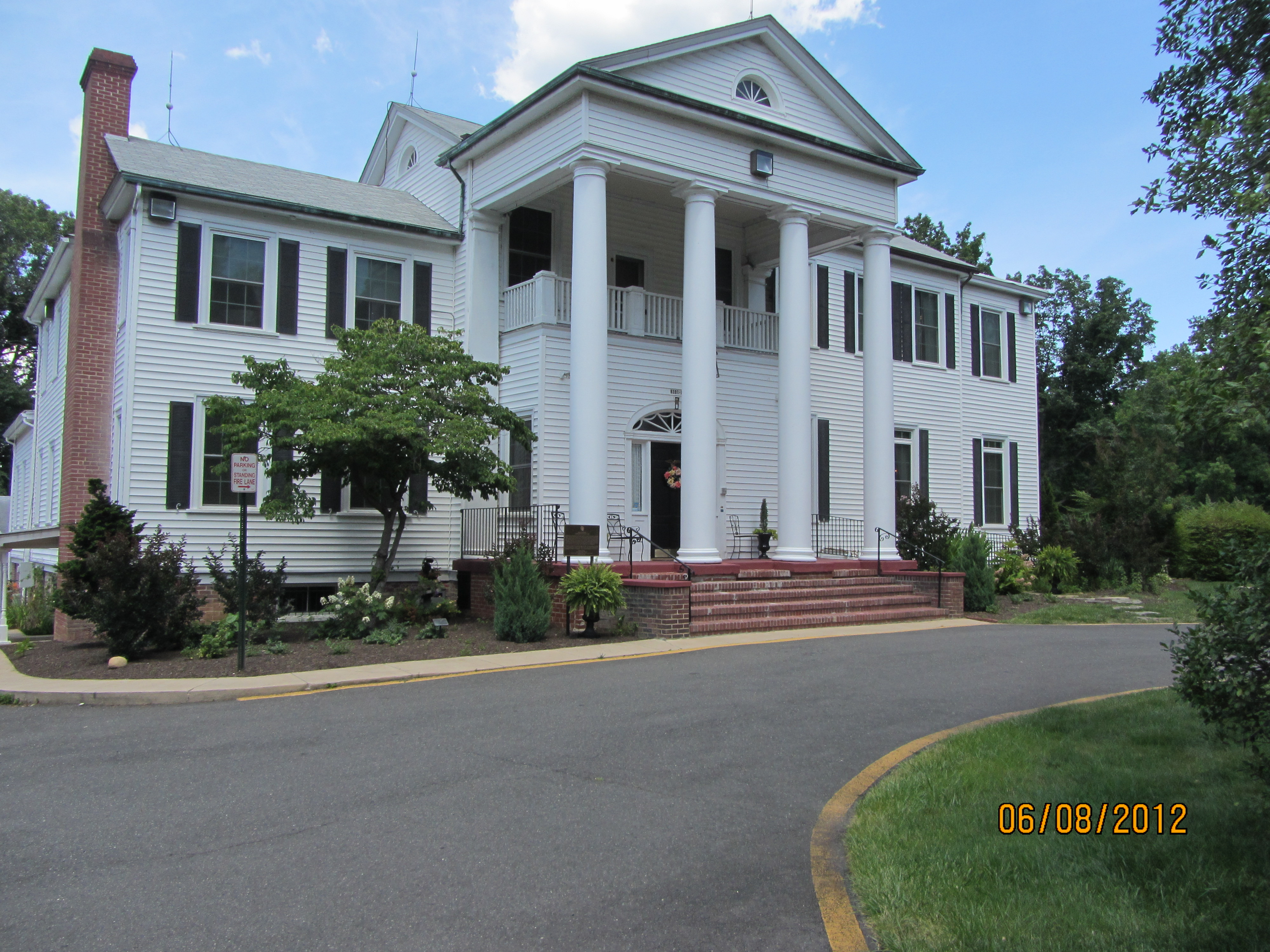
Collingwood mansion

== History ==
The Waynewood neighborhood was once part of the Mount Vernon plantation. Waynewood is situated on what was River Farm, one of five farms comprising the Mount Vernon plantation.

In 1754, when George Washington became the sole owner of Mount Vernon, he began acquiring additional tracts until the plantation grew in size from the original 2,126 acres to more than 8,000 acres. The five farms, all highly developed and well-cultivated, were known as Mansion House Farm, Union Farm, Muddy Hole Farm, Dogue Run Farm, and River Farm. River Farm consisted of 1,806 acres and was purchased in 1769.

Using present day landmarks, the original farm was roughly bounded on the north by present-day Wellington, to the east by the Potomac River, and running diagonally south and west to Little Hunting Creek.

George Washington granted a life interest in the northern section of River Farm, marked on his map as "Wellington Farm", to Tobias Lear, who was his private secretary and tutor to the Washington grandchildren. Lear married Mrs. Martha Washington's niece, Fannie Bassett, and was considered a relative.

After Lear's death in 1816, ownership of the farm reverted to two of Washington's great-nephews, who, in 1859, sold 652 acres of the northern boundary of River Farm to Stacy H. Snowden, a Quaker from New Jersey. The Stacy Snowden property, known as "Collingwood," extended south from Wellington and included a large tract stretching west from the Potomac River to Fort Hunt Road. Joining the Charles Wilkins' farm to the south ("Grassymeade"), this is approximately the site of the present Waynewood subdivision.

An electric car line, established in 1892, ran from Washington, D.C. to Mount Vernon until the George Washington Memorial Parkway opened in 1932. In 1906, the railway hauled 1,732,734 passengers; and averaged about 26 passenger trains and four freight trains daily between Washington and Mount Vernon.

In addition to the Waynewood subdivision, two stately and historic old mansions, now restored and modernized, stand on the original River Farm property. The Tobias Lear home, "Wellington," at 7931 East Boulevard Drive, was built in 1740, and is now the headquarters for the American Horticultural Society.

The earliest part of Collingwood, located at 8301 East Boulevard Drive, was built in 1785. It was previously headquarters for National Sojourners, Inc., an organization of active and retired military officers who are Master Masons. It also housed the Collingwood Library and Museum on Americanism. Today it is owned by Tyler Murrell, one of the owners of Five Guys, and facing demolition.

The Waynewood neighborhood subdivision was developed by Clarence W. Gosnell, Inc., and consists of approximately 301 acres, which had been acquired from five separate owners. The community was formally opened in 1957 and in 2007, celebrated its 50th anniversary.
