= Collingwood (mansion) =

Historic mansion in Fort Hunt, Virginia

Coordinates: 38°43′56″N 77°02′41″W

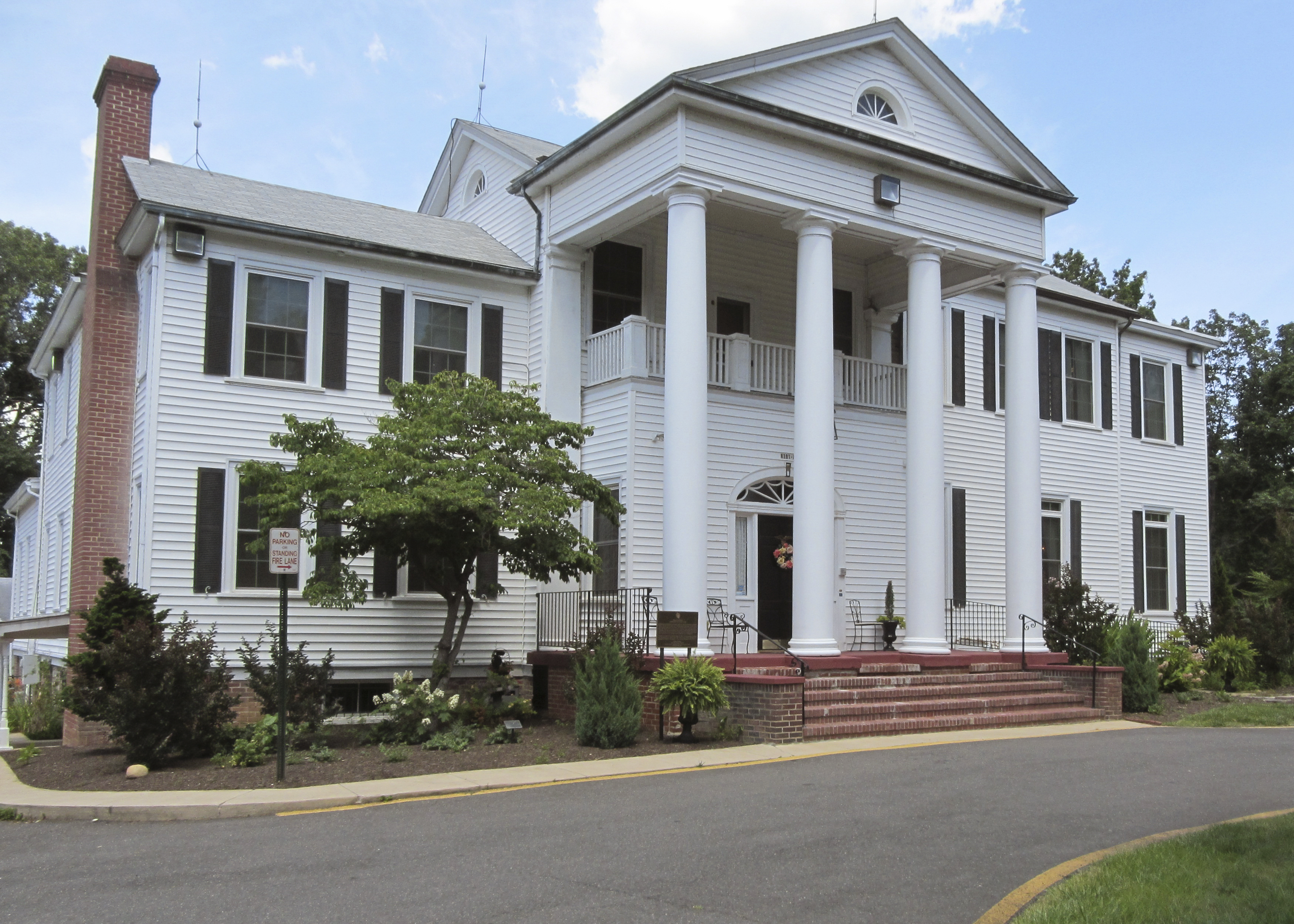
Collingwood in 2012

Collingwood was a historic mansion in Fort Hunt, Virginia listed on the Fairfax County Inventory of Historic Sites. The mansion was first built in 1859 on a subdivision of George Washington's former River Farm, and significantly altered and expanded in the early 20th century. In July 2019, it was reported that the mansion would be demolished later that year.

== History ==
=== Background ===
The property was part of the larger 1,800-acre (730 ha) Piscataway Neck estate established by Giles Brent in 1653 or 1654. Giles Brent was the brother of Margaret Brent. Upon his death in 1679, it passed to his cousin George Brent, and then to William Clifton in 1739.

The property was purchased by George Washington in 1760 and formed an outlying part of his Mount Vernon estate known as River Farm. A small residence is believed to have been built on the property around 1785 for Washington's overseer, Sam Johnson, and during this time the property became notorious as a site for duels. During Washington's lifetime, the property was leased to Tobias Lear, who lived there until he died in 1816. It is believed that the name Collingwood came from Admiral Cuthbert Collingwood, an associate of Lear's during time he spent in Algiers. Upon Washington's death in 1799, the land passed to his nephew's descendants, George Fayette Washington and Charles Augustine Washington.

=== Mansion ===
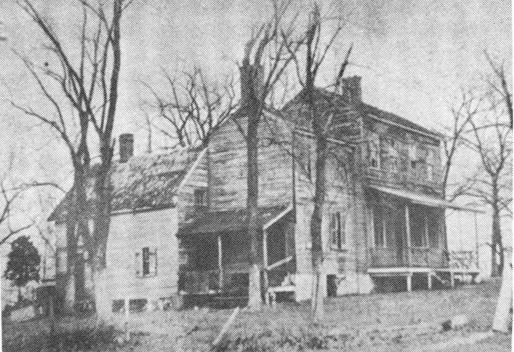
Collingwood around 1890

In 1859, a 652-acre (264 ha) part of River Farm was sold to brothers Stacey, Isaac, and William Snowden, who subdivided the property further. Isaac and his wife Anna lived at the Wellington mansion, currently headquarters of the American Horticultural Society, while Stacey and his wife Sarah lived at the present Collingwood estate. Snowden used the land as a dairy farm. The current house was constructed in 1852 by Henry Allen Taylor.

The property was sold in 1894 to LeRoy Delaney, and then to Clayton Emig, and then in 1922 to Mark Reid Yates. At this point, the land west of the George Washington Memorial Parkway was sold to developers. In the 1930s, the house was described as "a seven room, one-and one-half story building without wings." The house was then remodeled as a two-story Colonial Revival by Natalie Yates, who added the portico and columns, and operated it as a tea room and restaurant. During World War II it was used as a school for military intelligence. In 1968, the land was sold to Daniel Cohen and William Eacho. Collingwood is listed on the Fairfax County Inventory of Historic Sites.

=== Collingwood Library and Museum ===
The mansion was purchased by the National Sojourners for use as their headquarters in 1977, and they inaugurated the Collingwood Library and Museum on Americanism on the site. The organization renovated the mansion, which had been vacant and was in disrepair. The library contained about 7000 books on military history and had copies of the US constitution and a "near complete set of the writings of George Washington". It had numerous artifacts of presidential china and American Indian culture such as a Sioux chief's headdress.

The National Sojourners sold the property in 2015 after falling into debt. It was purchased by Tyler Murrell, one of the family that owns the Five Guys restaurant chain. In July 2019, it was reported that a permit to demolish the mansion and replace it with a new home had been granted.
