= River Farm =

Historic estate and gardens in Alexandria, Virginia, United States

Coordinates: 38°44′32″N 77°02′41″W

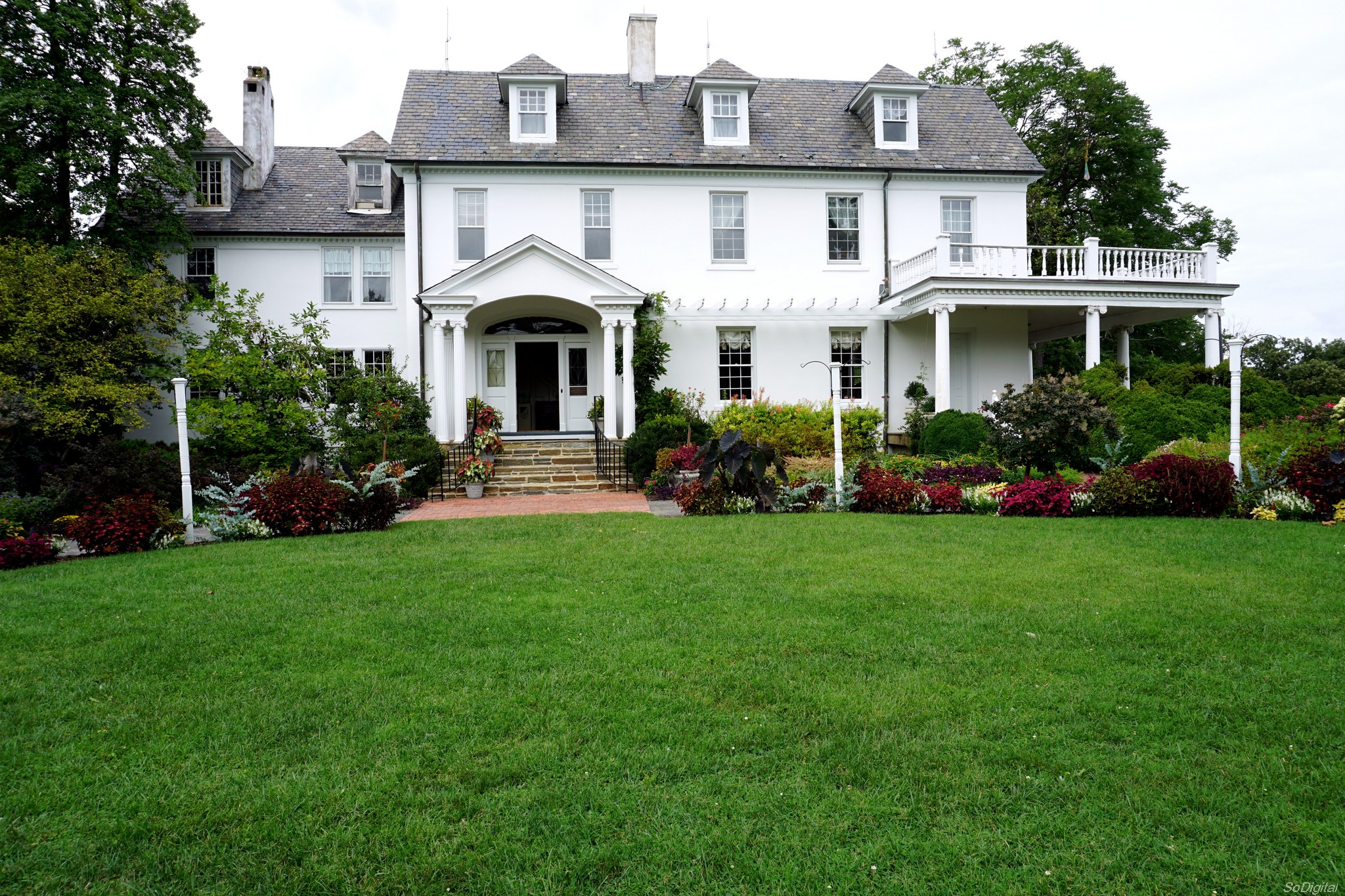
- River Farm house
- Interactive map of River Farm
- Location: 7931 East Boulevard Drive, Alexandria, Virginia
- Area: 27 acres (11 ha)
- Owner: American Horticultural Society
- Website: ahsgardening.org/visit-river-farm/

River Farm, permanent home to the American Horticultural Society (AHS) headquarters, is a 27-acre (11 ha) landscape located at 7931 East Boulevard Drive, Alexandria, Virginia. The estate takes its name from a larger plot of land which formed an outlying part of George Washington's Mount Vernon estate.

== History ==
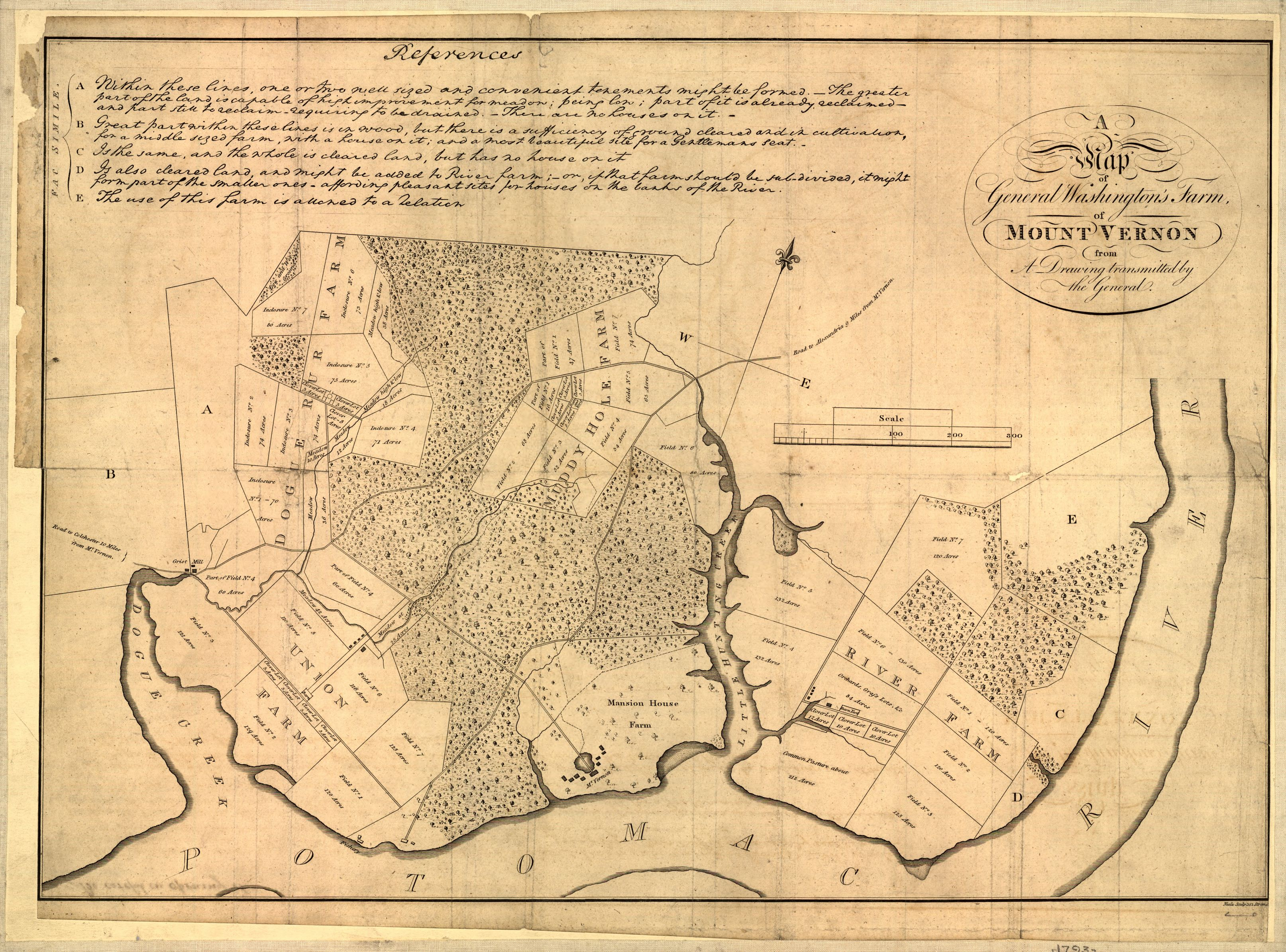
Map showing River Farm as part of George Washington's Mount Vernon estate.

The River Farm property was established in 1653–54 by Giles Brent and his wife, Mary Kittamaquund, a princess of the Piscataway tribe. Brent received a grant of 1,800 acres (7.3 km^{2}) named Piscataway Neck. In 1739 his successor George Brent transferred the property to his brother-in-law William Clifton, who renamed the property Clifton's Neck. By 1757, Clifton had erected a brick house on the peninsula.

Following financial difficulties, Clifton sold the land to neighbor, founding father George Washington, who obtained the property for £1,210 through a bankruptcy sale in 1760. Washington changed the name of Clifton's Neck to River Farm and leased the property to tenant farmers.

River Farm was passed down through two immediate generations of Washingtons and later sold with 652 acres of Washington's original land to the Snowden brothers of New Jersey. This included the houses known as "Wellington," "Waynewood," and "Collingwood." The property was home to numerous owners including Malcolm Matheson, who bought the property in 1919. Matheson placed the property on the market in 1971 and received an offer from the Soviet Embassy who planned to use the land as a retreat or dacha for its staff.

=== Acquisition by AHS ===
After Matheson took his land off the market to avoid the Soviet sale and vocal public opposition, Enid Annenberg Haupt, philanthropist, gardener, and member of the AHS board of directors took interest in the property. AHS purchased the property in the 1970s and Haupt donated funds over several years to help AHS pay off the mortgage. While under the ownership of AHS, she expressed a desire to see the grounds kept open to the public. In 1973, AHS relocated its headquarters from the city of Alexandria to nearby River Farm. The property was renamed River Farm in honor of President George Washington, one of the many land owners.

=== River Farm for sale ===
On September 4, 2020, the board of AHS announced that it was putting the property up for sale, supposedly to ensure the viability of their small national nonprofit, hit hard financially because of COVID-19 and the major expense of maintaining and operating River Farm. The real estate listing estimated the property's value as between $18 million and $30 million. Mount Vernon District Supervisor Daniel G. Storck and Paul Gilbert of NOVA Parks, among others, worked to put together a purchase offer that could meet both AHS’s objectives and those of the Alexandria community, which hoped to see the privately owned land purchased by local entities and transformed into a public park.

On September 29, 2021, the interim executive director, CFO and all 5 of the board members who wanted to sell River Farm all resigned in defeat after a year of a stalemate. The remaining 5 Board members removed River Farm from the real estate market. They reiterated their commitment to keeping AHS at River Farm and ensuring that it is open to the public in perpetuity, as Enid Annenberg Haupt always intended.

== Washington at River Farm ==
Today's smaller River Farm is located on the northernmost division of Washington's original property. River Farm features a 1920s estate house with naturalistic and formal garden areas. It still preserves several historical associations with Washington. Its Kentucky coffeetrees are descendants of those first introduced to Virginia upon Washington's return from surveys in the Ohio River Valley.

The estate's oldest trees are a large Black Walnut Tree which is over 250 years old, and the 240+ year old Osage-orange (Maclura pomifera), believed to be one of the largest in the United States. An old tale claimed it was a gift from Thomas Jefferson to the Washington family, and grown from seedlings of the Lewis and Clark Expedition of 1804–1806.

== Horticultural landmark ==
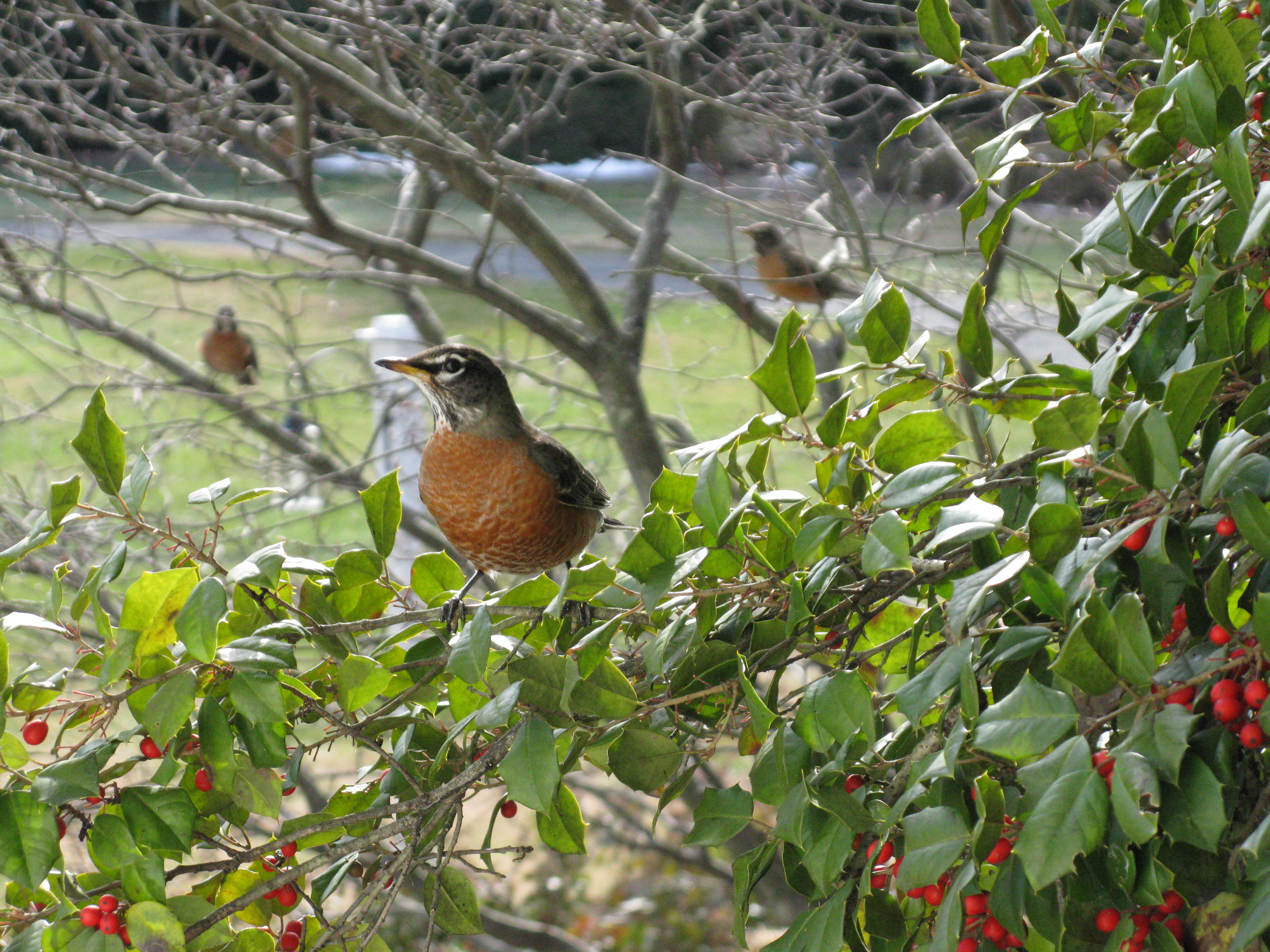
A variety of species visit the gardens.

In 2004, River Farm was designated a Horticultural Landmark by the American Society for Horticultural Science. This recognition was due to the ability to retain its historic character while at the same time showcasing the best and most environmentally responsible gardening practices. Horticultural Landmark features include vistas stretching down to the Potomac River as well as its artful blend of naturalistic and formal gardens that offer year-round delight to visitors of all ages.

In addition, there are extensive and creative play areas for children, demonstration gardens for both edible and ornamental plants, a four-acre meadow, and scenic resting places for picnickers, artists, and romantics. Other highlights include two small buildings with planted "living" roofs, one of the largest Osage-orange trees in the nation, an orchard, a grove of rare Franklinia trees, and frequent sightings of bald eagles, bluebirds, foxes, wild turkeys and other wildlife.

== Features ==
The farm's gardens include:

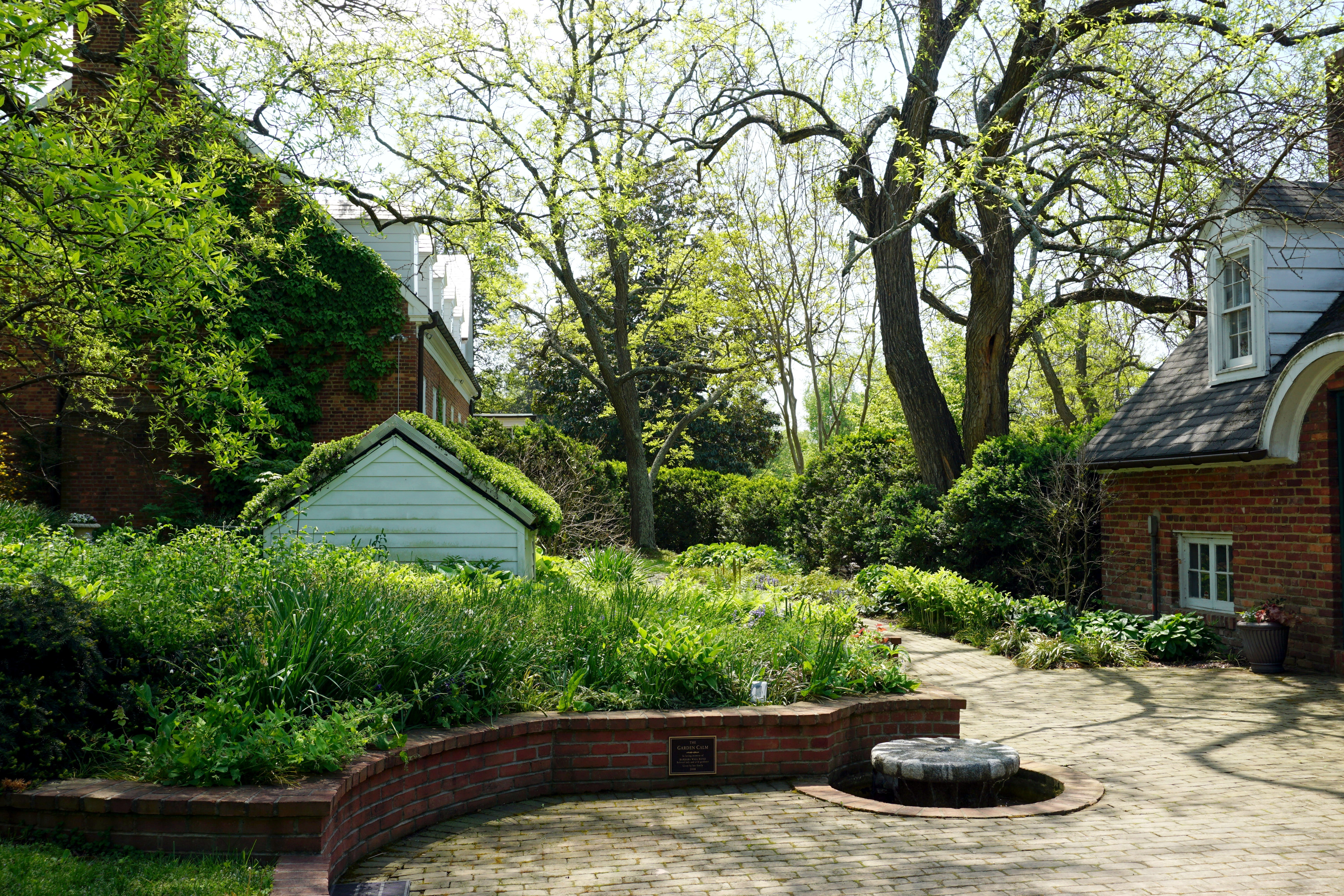
The Calm Garden

- André Bluemel Meadow (4 acres/1.6 ha) – naturalistic area with native grasses and wildflowers. Two large black walnut trees (Juglans nigra) probably date to George Washington's ownership.
- Children's Garden – more than a dozen small gardens for children.
- Estate House plantings – native shrubs and trees, including Allegheny serviceberry (Amelanchier laevis), fringe tree (Chionanthus virginicus), dwarf fothergilla (Fothergilla gardenii), and Carolina silverbell (Halesia carolina), as well as a hedge of English boxwood (Buxus sempervirens 'Suffruticosa') with specimens nearly 100 years old.
- Garden Calm – shrubs, trees, and perennials for shade, with the large Osage-orange.
- George Harding Memorial Azalea Garden – hundreds of azalea species, varieties, and cultivars, plus small ornamental trees including river birch (Betula nigra 'Heritage'), dogwoods (Cornus sp.), dawn redwood (Metasequoia glyptostroboides), and dove trees (Davidia involucrata).
- Growing Connection Demonstration Garden – vegetables and herbs.
- Orchard – apple, pear, cherry, plum, and Japanese persimmon trees.
- Perennial Border – plants selected for resistance to diseases and pests.
- White House Gates – first installed at the White House in 1819, in the reconstruction after the War of 1812, and used for more than 120 years at the White House's northeast entrance.
- Wildlife Garden – a small pond with frogs, goldfish, tilapia and turtles, surrounded by blueberry and northern bayberry shrubs, grasses, junipers, and holly.

== Gallery ==
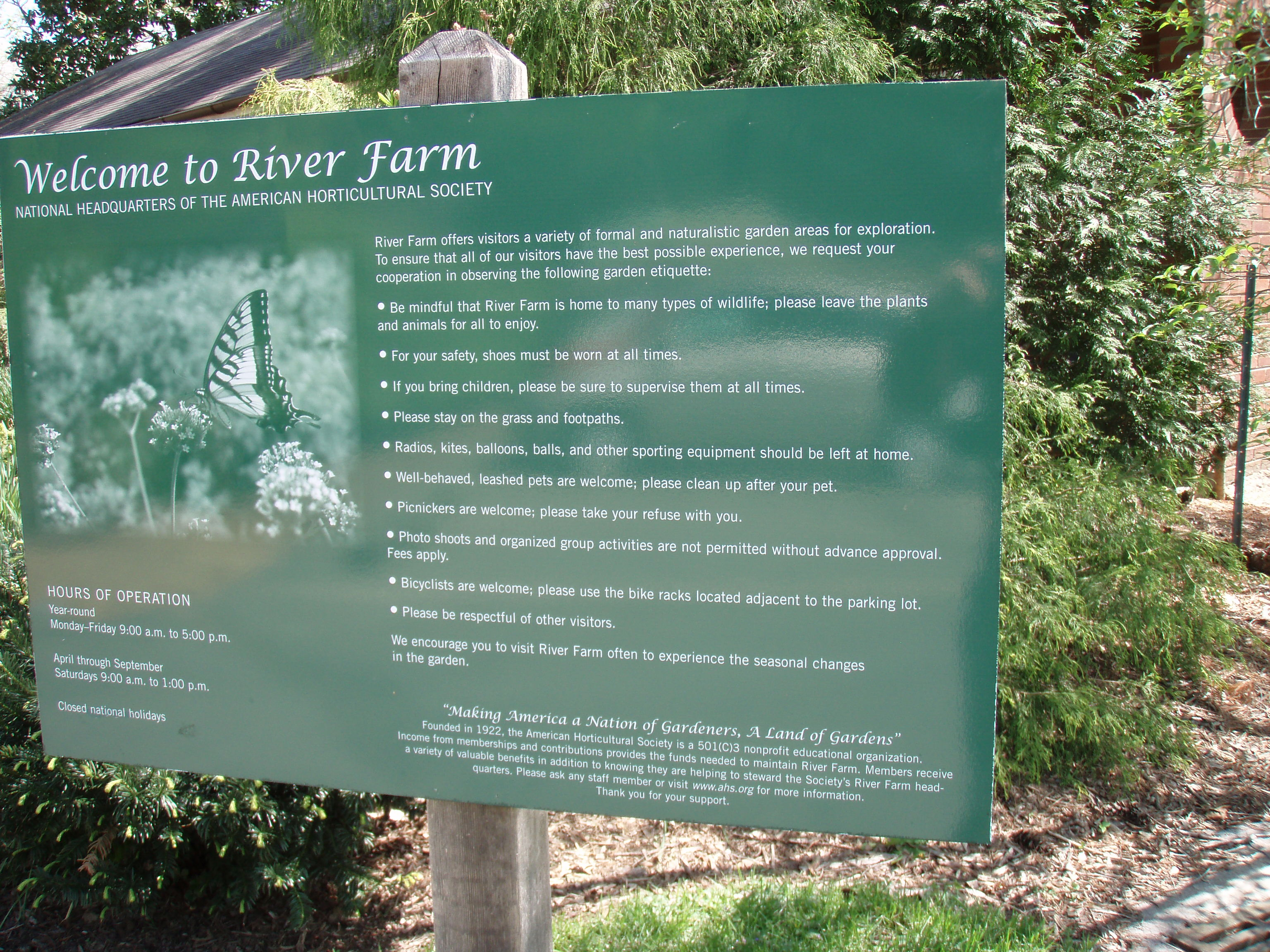
River Farm is the headquarters of AHS.

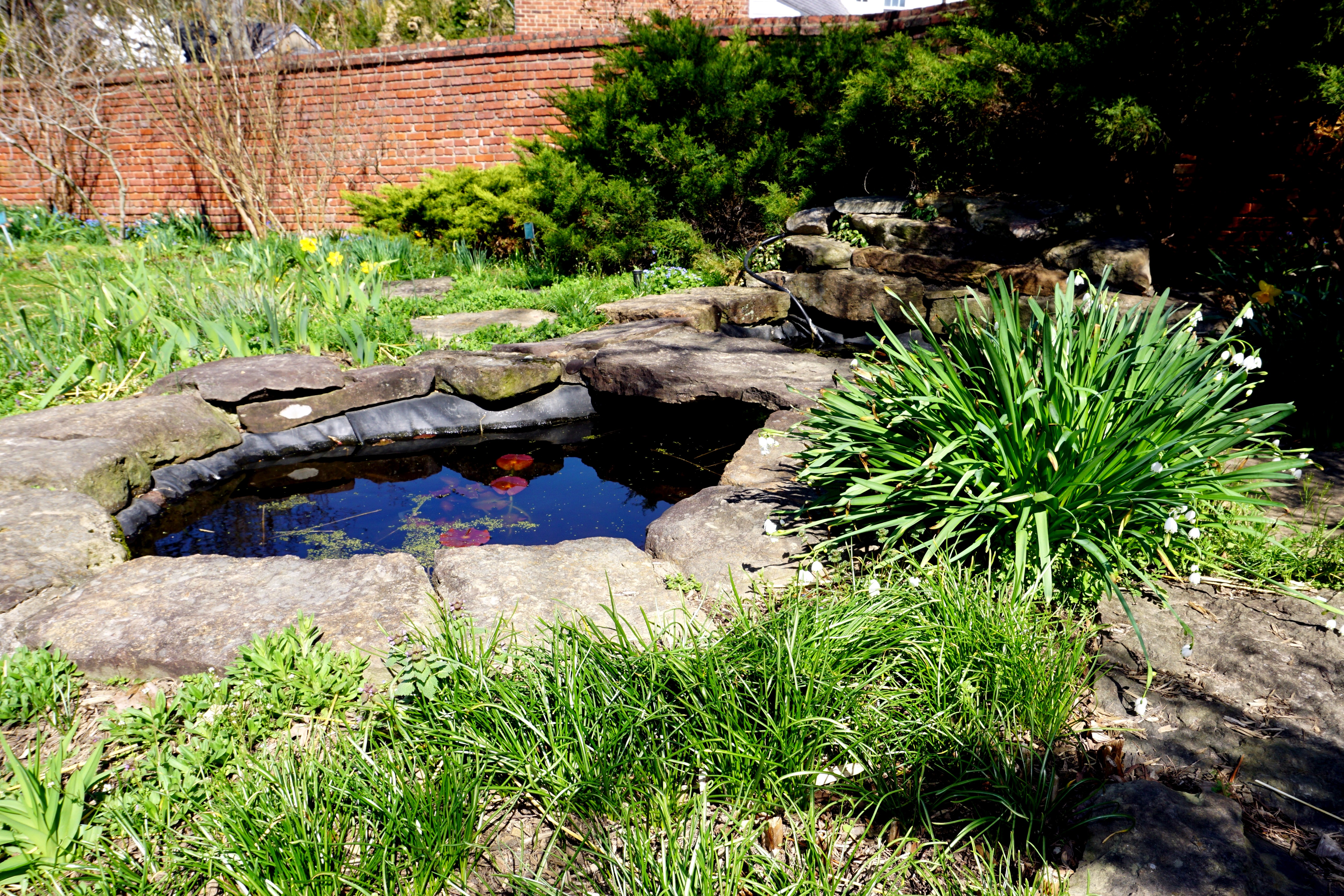
A small pond.

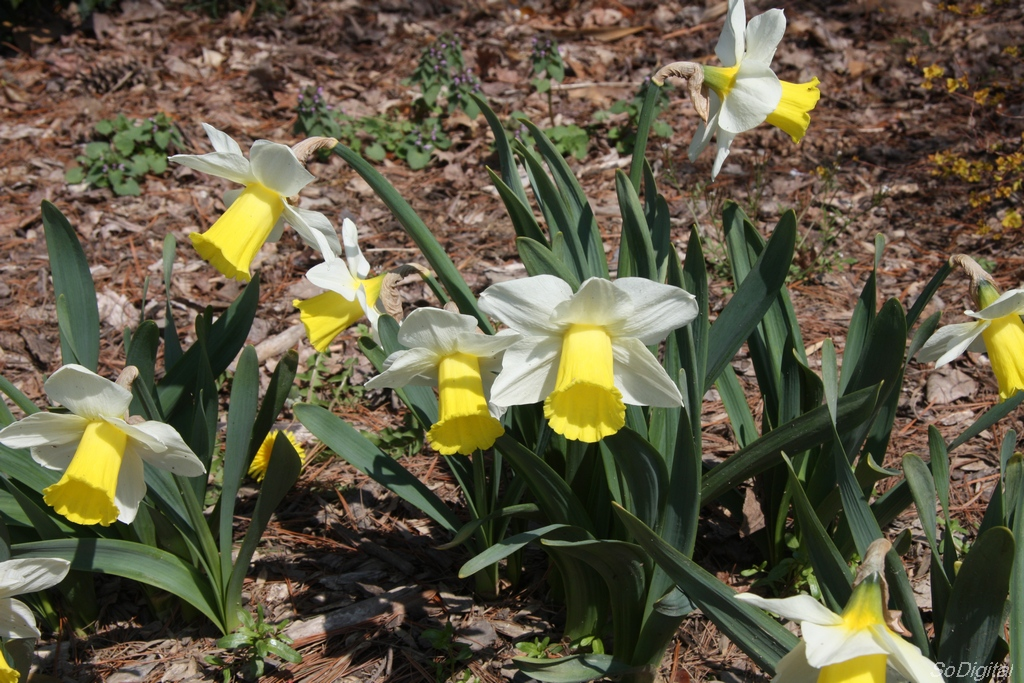
Close-up of flowers in a garden.

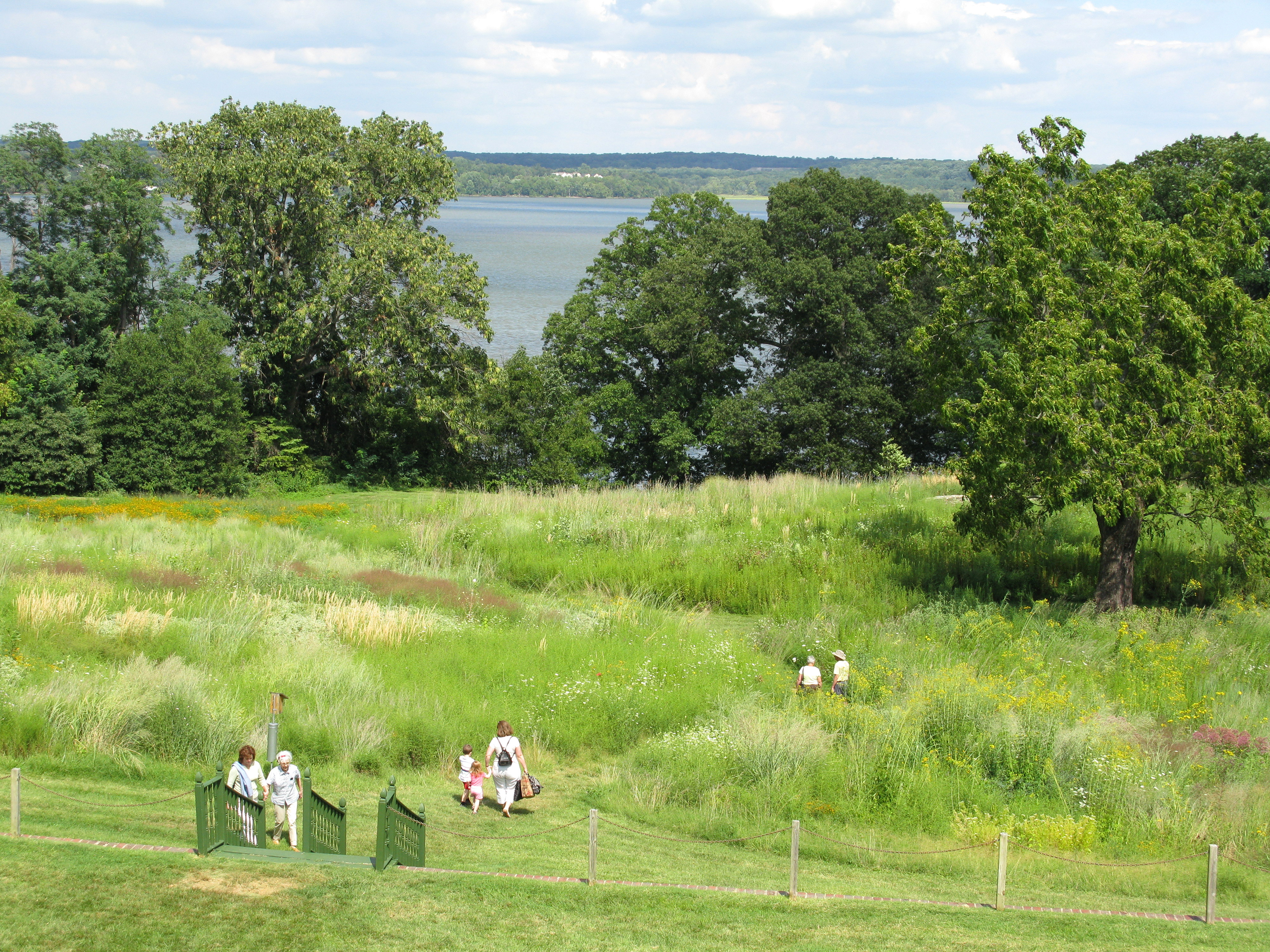
A walking trail near the lake.

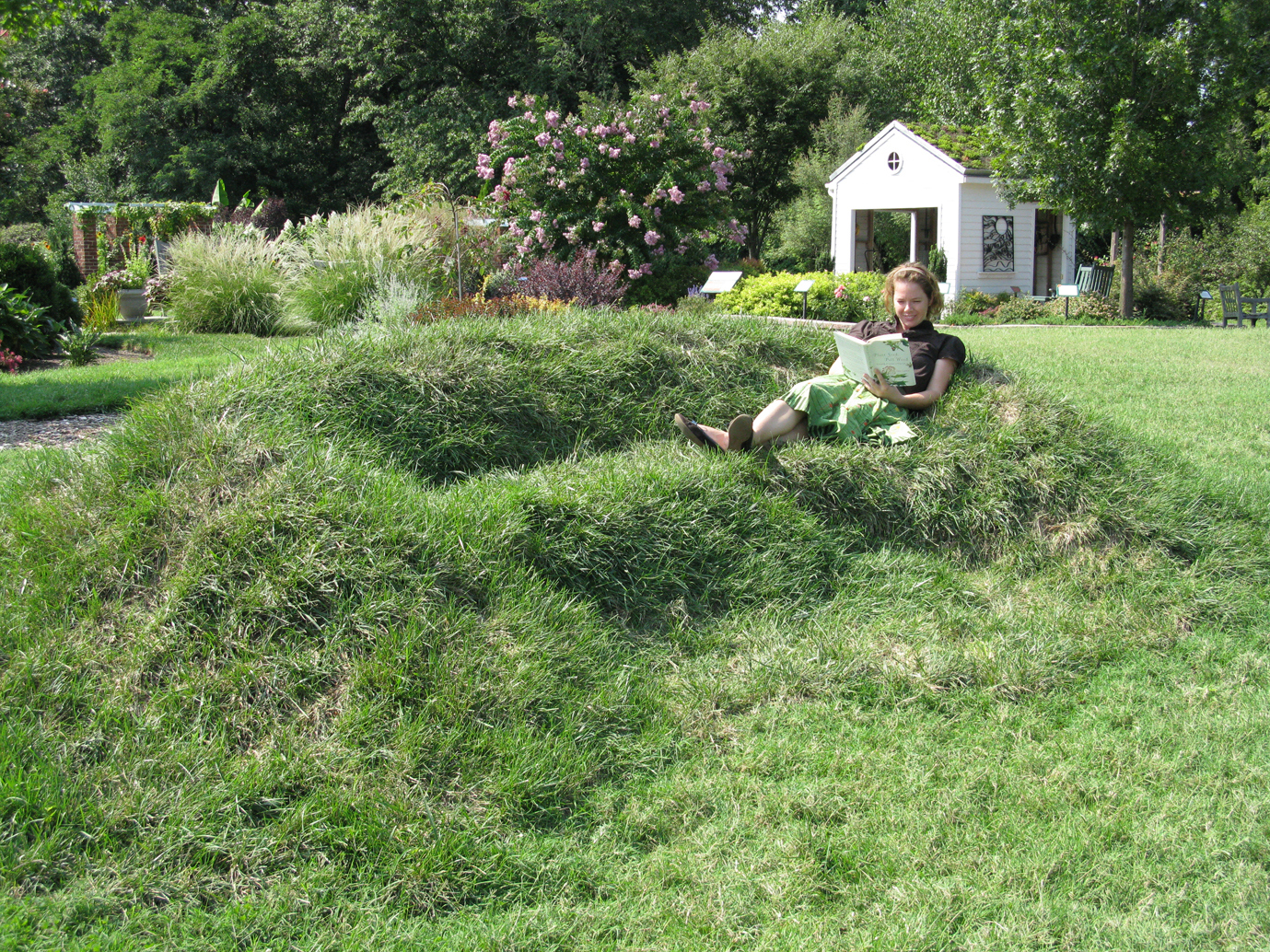
A seating area made from the landscape.

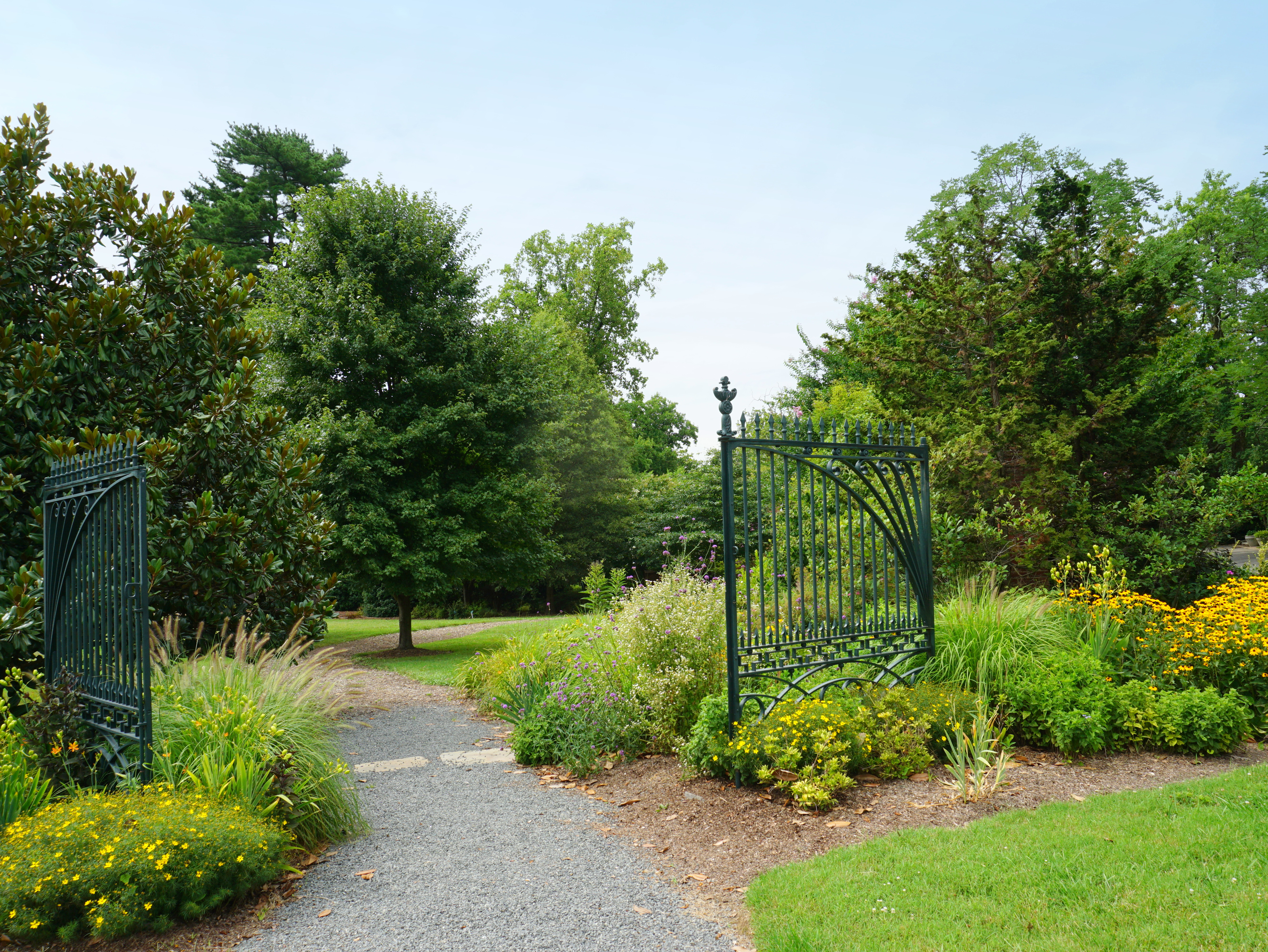
Historic White House gates.

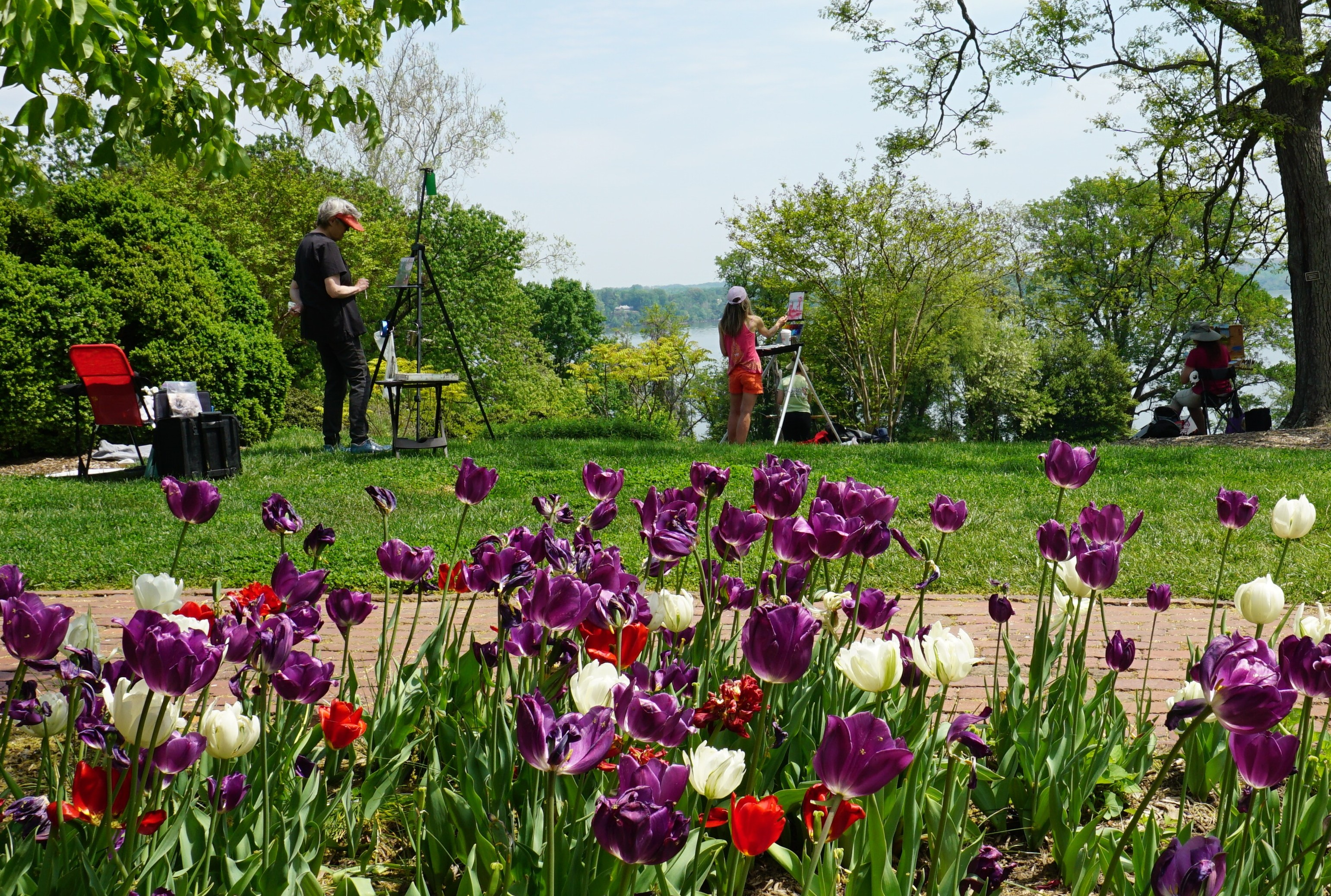
The grounds are a popular place for landscape painting.

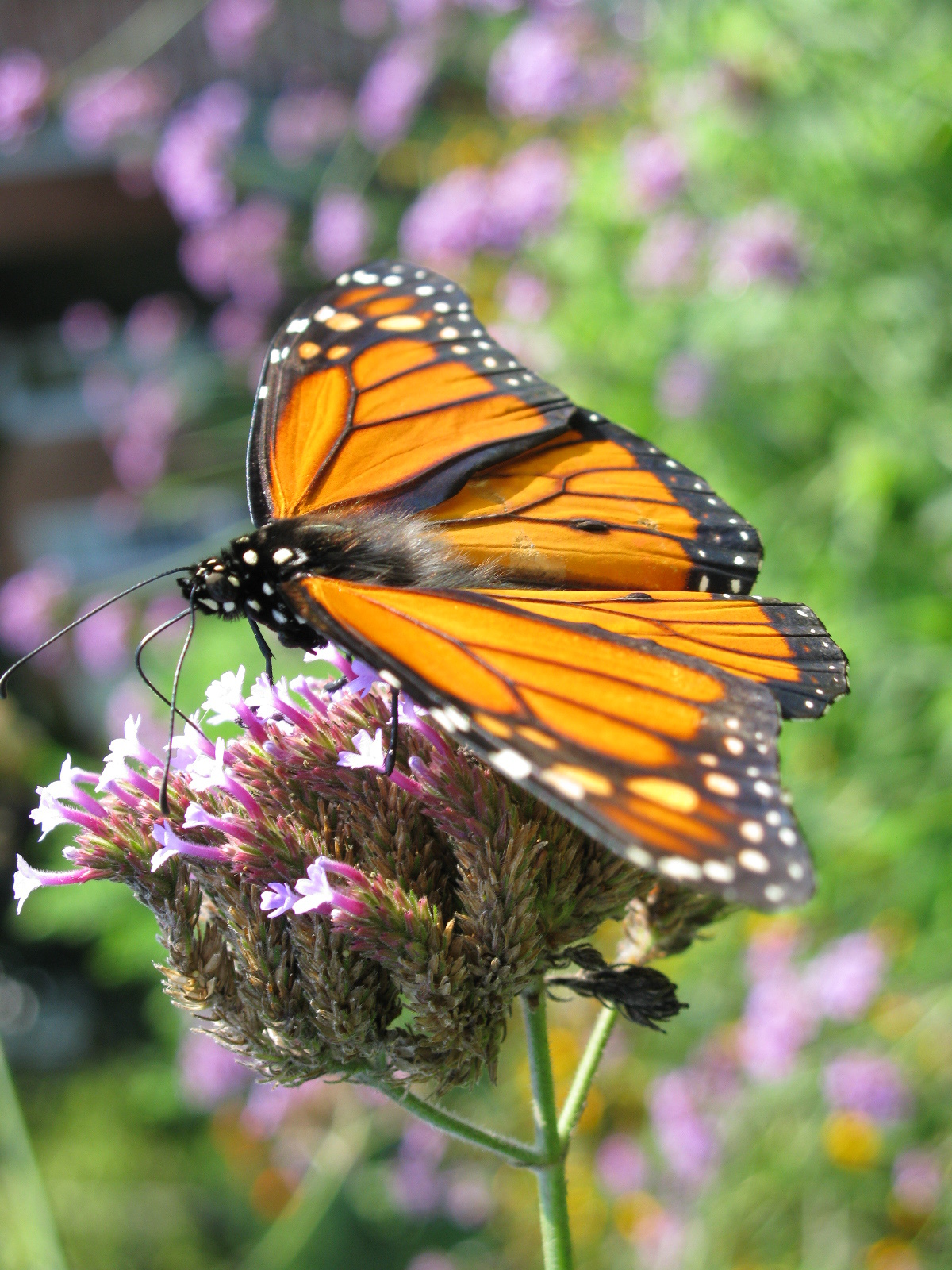
Butterfly on a flower in a garden area.

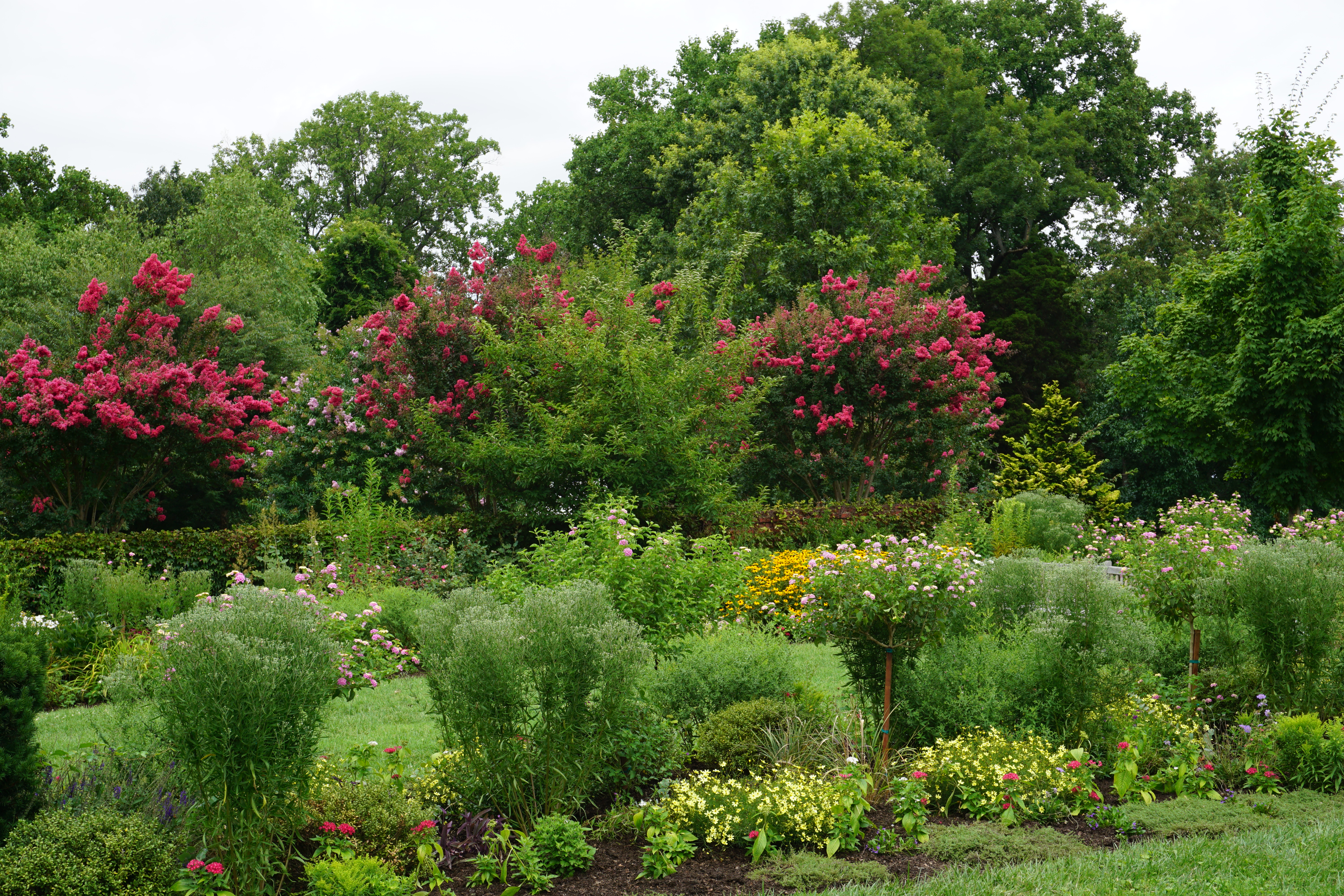
A view of one of the garden areas.

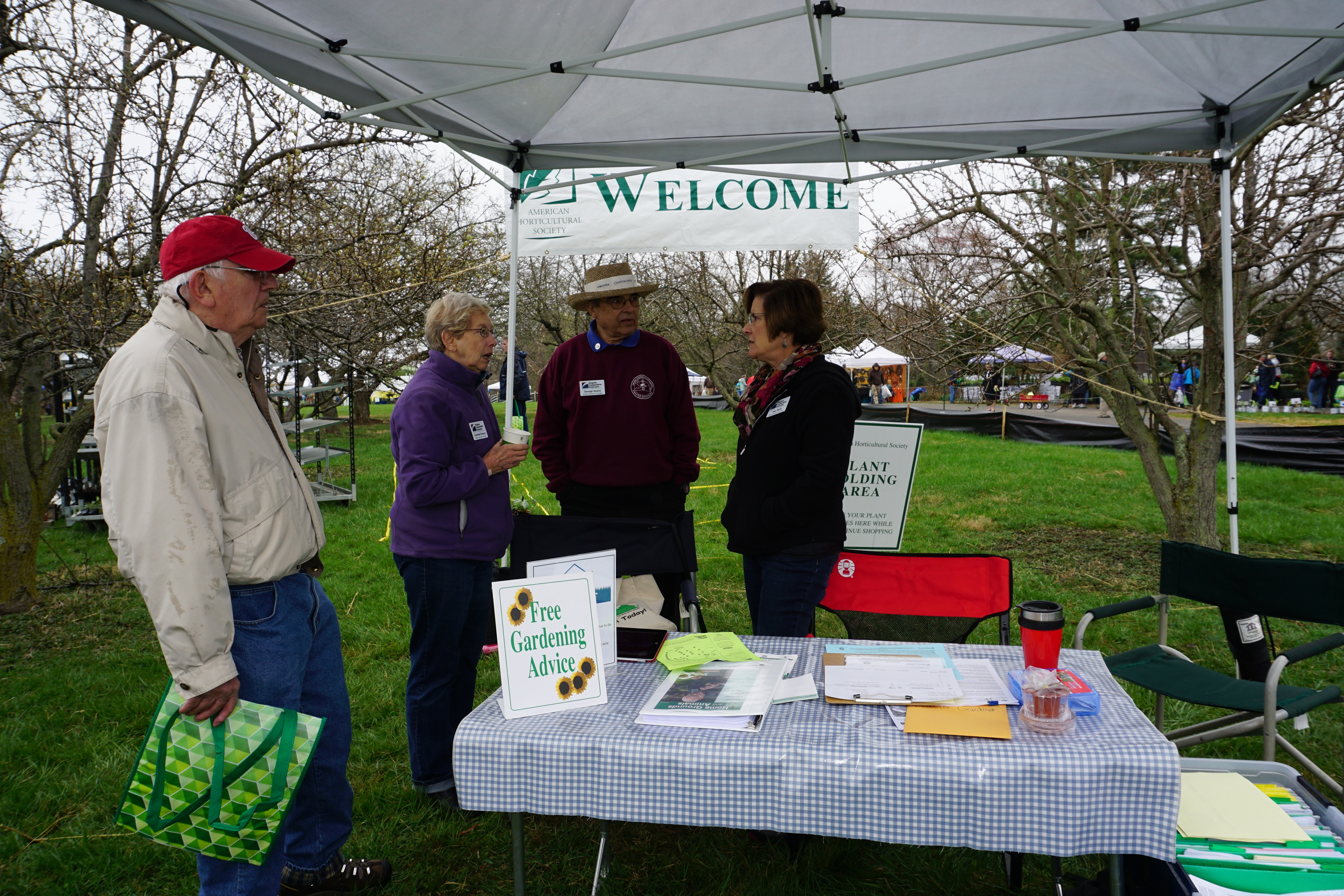
Many events are held onsite each year.

== See also ==
- List of botanical gardens in the United States
