= Ronald Markarian =

United States Air Force general

Ronald Markarian USAF
- Born: June 27, 1931; Fresno, California, U.S.
- Died: October 12, 2019 (aged 88)
- Military career
- Allegiance: United States of America
- Branch: United States Air Force
- Service years: 1949–1995
- Rank: Major general
- Conflicts: Vietnam War
- Awards: Legion of Merit (2); Bronze Star; Air Medal (5); Meritorious Service Medal (2); Joint Service Commendation Medal (2); Air Force Commendation Medal (2)
- Other work: California State Director of the U.S. Selective Service System; President of the Association of the United States Army

Ronald Hrant Markarian (June 27, 1931 – October 12, 2019) was the California State Director of the U.S. Selective Service System and a former Major General of the United States Air Force. Ronald Markarian was active in community affairs and has served in a variety of leadership roles in military, veteran and public service organizations. He served on several State and Federal boards and has been the Director of the United States Selective Service System in California since his appointment in 1987. He was instrumental in founding the Association of the United States Army (AUSA; Chapter 6105) in 1982, and served as the first president of the chapter and later serving two additional terms totaling 15 years as president. During his last presidency, the chapter was designated Best Chapter in AUSA for seven consecutive years, from 2000 to 2006. He also served as the AUSA sixth region president and an AUSA national trustee.

Major General Markarian served in the United States military for 46 years. He flew 116 combat reconnaissance missions during the Vietnam War receiving numerous awards, including two Legion of Merits and the Bronze Star. Additionally, Markarian has received awards from many military organizations, including the Association of the U.S. Army's National Golden Eagle Award and National Distinguished Service Award, and he was the 2002 recipient of the organization's Anthony Drexel Biddle Award, President's Award. Major General Markarian has also graduated from several military schools and holds a master's degree in public administration from George Washington University.

== Life ==
Of Armenian descent, Markarian's family was one of the early Armenian settlers of the San Joaquin Valley. his paternal great-grandfather, Melkon Markarian was the first generation of the family to have previously moved to the United States from Armenia becoming U.S. citizen in 1865. He later went back to Armenia, married, raised a family and then resettled in America moving to Fresno in 1881. He was related to famous sculptor Varaz Samuelian through his maternal grandmother. Ronald states that his great-grandparents were among the pioneers of the fig industry in California; his father Theodore and mother Rose, were both born in Fresno. While the father, born in 1899, died in 1963. his mother who was born on May 21, 1909, died on March 15, 2010, at the age of 100.

Ron Markarian also was born in Fresno, on June 27, 1931, attended local schools in North Fresno and graduated from Clovis High School in 1949. He then continued his education by enrolling in Fresno State College (later known as California State University, Fresno). Although Markarian was in the graduating class of 1953, he was able to complete his studies mid-term in 1952 and graduate early.

Commissioned in the Air Force, he left Fresno for extended active duty; to continue his formal education later at George Washington University and receive his master's degree in Public Administration in 1964.

== Military service ==
Markarian began his military service in the Clovis High School as part of the California Cadet Corps. However, it lasted for a brief period due to the termination of the program. The school was not able to regain its cadet commandant, or find a replacement. While still a high school senior, Markarian enlisted in the California National Guard in 1949 and served in the heavy mortar company, 185th Infantry Regiment for three years. Part of that time, Markarian was enrolled in the Air Force Reserve Officer Training Corps at Fresno State. When he completed his education, Markarian left Fresno for active duty with the United States Air Force. He went into flight-training and from there his first assignment was with the B-47 medium strategic bombardment program in the Strategic Air Command (SAC). Markarian spent six years with the 303d Bombardment Group at Davis-Monthan Air Force Base in Tucson, Arizona, flying as a B-47 navigator/bombardier.

He left the 303d in 1960 to join the B-52 heavy bombardment program at Fairchild Air Force Base, Spokane, Washington, he spent four years as a B-52 combat crew member. During the Cuban Missile Crisis, they moved into Airborne Alert, which enabled them to strike targets from any point along the airborne route. Markarian was given the task to fly aircraft armed with nuclear weapons. During his time at the Fairchild Air Force Base, Markarian was given tasks to fly to Bangor, Maine, and Spain.

During that assignment, Markarian was selected to attend Command & General Staff College at Maxwell Air Force Base, Alabama, and upon graduation was assigned to the Strategic Air Command headquarters with the Joint Strategic Target Planning Staff (JSTPS) at Offutt Air Force Base in Omaha, Nebraska. They were engaged in the preparation of the United States Strategic Nuclear War Plan. Their job was to plan the basing, routing and targeting for all U.S. bombers, land and sea-based missiles. Markarians additional duties involved establishing the intelligence election requirements for the Pacific Command. This job allowed him to visit U.S. and Allied military activities in Japan, Okinawa, Korea, Taiwan, the Philippines and Southeast Asia.

== Vietnam ==
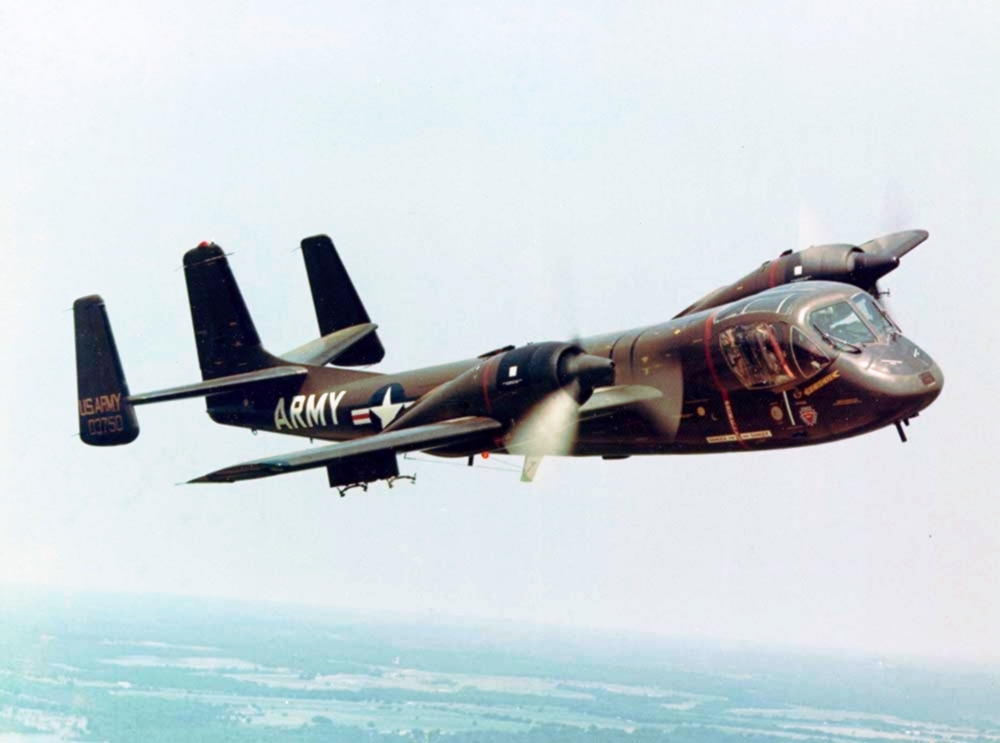
US Army OV-1 Mohawk light attack and observation aircraft

Upon completion of his PACOM duties, he was sent to Vietnam for a year with the Military Assistance Command, Vietnam (MACV) and was assigned as the Chief of the Air Reconnaissance Operations Branch, J-2. His flying duties there were principally in the Grumman OV-1 Mohawk reconnaissance aircraft.

== Community service ==
Markarian has been the national president of the National Sojourners, a military Masonic organization; the national president of the State Guard Association of the United States; a member of the Central California Chapter of the Association of the U.S. Army (AUSA) in Fresno; has served as the AUSA Sixth Region president, as member of the AUSA National Council of Trustees and as the Central California chapter president in three separate occasions.

=== Political career ===
Upon his return from Vietnam, he became active member of the Republican Party. Markarian entered politics and became the Fresno County Republican Party Chairman for four years.

== Recognition ==
On November 12, 2004, the Armenian Professionals Network (APN) of the Western Diocese, under the presidency of Archbishop Hovnan Derderian, Primate of the Western Diocese of the Armenian Church of North America, hosted a dinner reception in the Kalaydjian Hall of the Western Diocese to pay tribute to the Armenian men and women who served in the Armed Forces of the United States. The dinner was attended by the Primate, several clergy of the Western Diocese, as well as several dignitaries, including Ron Markarian.

In 2009 Markarian was inducted to the Clovis Hall of Fame.

== Military decorations ==
Ronald Markarian's awards include:

US Air Force Command Pilot Badge

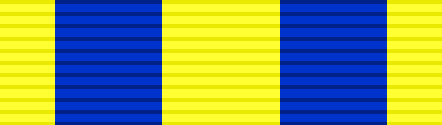
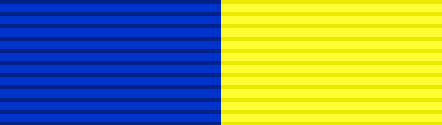
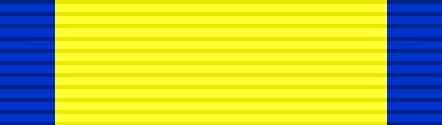
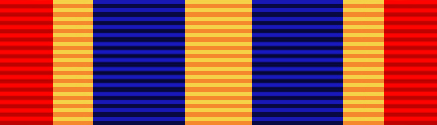
Legion of Merit (two awards)
Bronze Star Medal
Air Medal (five awards)
Meritorious Service Medal (two awards)
Joint Service Commendation Medal with one Oak Leaf Cluster (two awards)
Air Force Commendation Medal (two awards)
Air Force Outstanding Unit Award
Army Meritorious Unit Commendation
Selective Service System Distinguished Service Medal
Selective Service System Exceptional Service Medal
Selective Service System Meritorious Service Medal (two awards)
California Medal of Merit
Combat Readiness Medal
National Defense Service Medal with two bronze service stars (three awards)
Vietnam Service Medal
Air Force Longevity Service Award (eleven awards)
Vietnam Gallantry Cross with Bronze Star
Vietnam Armed Forces Honor Medal (1st Class)
Vietnam Staff Service Medal (1st Class)
Vietnam Gallantry Cross Unit Citation
Vietnam Campaign Medal
