= National Sojourners =

National Sojourners is an American patriotic organization of Freemasons who have served in the United States Uniformed Services, or are elected to honorary membership. Members are organized and meet in Chapters.

== Purpose ==
The stated purpose of the organization is "to organize current and former members of the uniformed (...) of the United States (...) who are Master Masons (...) for the promotion of good fellowship among its members, (...) for developing true Patriotism and Americanism throughout the Nation (...)"

The organization pursues its aims by assisting local Masonic authorities through initiatives which promote American patriotism and Americanism, both with the fraternity and the community. These include: Youth Leadership Programs, essay contests, educational programs and involvement in ROTC and JROTC awards.

== History ==
The organization developed from a group of American Freemasons in the Philippines who participated from 1898 in meetings of a field lodge attached to the North Dakota Regiment of Volunteer Infantry, which met under a dispensation granted by the Grand Lodge of North Dakota. When the regiment withdrew from the Philippines in 1900, the American Freemasons left behind formed an informal Sojourners Club.

In 1917, a group of Masonic military officers, meeting in Chicago, Illinois, formally organized the Chicago Sojourners Club. Further Sojourners' clubs formed at army posts and naval bases around the United States and overseas. In 1927, the word Club was officially dropped and the National Sojourners were formally incorporated in 1931. Today, National Sojourners are organized in some 160 chapters in 46 states of the United States as well as in Germany and France.

The organization's headquarters are in Chantilly, Virginia. It also houses the Museum on Americanism. Both are open to the public. <www.mationalsojourners.net>

== Notable members ==
- Rear Admiral Richard E. Byrd, USN (1888–1957), member of National Sojourners Chapter No. 3 at Washington
- Major General Ronald Markarian, USAF (1931–2019), former National President of National Sojourners
- General of the Army Douglas MacArthur
- President (Colonel) Harry S. Truman
