= American Horticultural Society =

U.S. non-profit organization

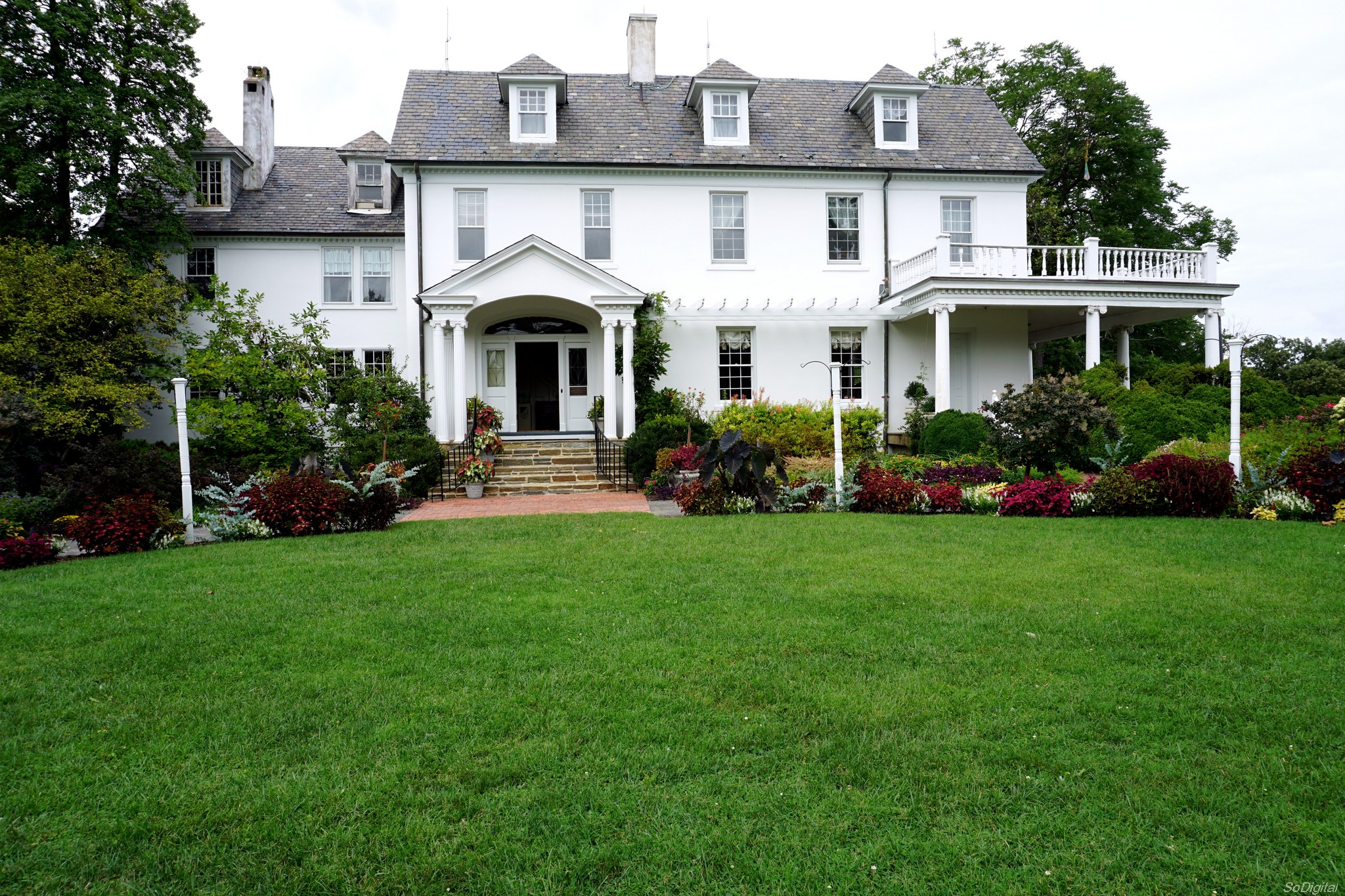
- River Farm, the society's headquarters
- Abbreviation: AHS
- Formation: 1922; 104 years ago
- Type: Nonprofit organization
- Headquarters: River Farm, Fairfax County, Virginia
- Region served: United States
- Publication: The American Gardener
- Website: www.ahsgardening.org

The American Horticultural Society (AHS) is an American nonprofit membership organization devoted to horticulture and gardening education. Founded in 1922, it has been headquartered since 1973 at River Farm, a historic property in Fairfax County, Virginia, near Alexandria.

== History ==
The society was founded in Washington, D.C., in 1922. In June 1926, it merged with the National Horticultural Society of America and retained the American Horticultural Society name. A further merger with the American Horticultural Council took place in 1960, again under the AHS name.

The National Horticultural Society began publishing The National Horticultural Magazine in 1922. Following the 1926 merger, the periodical was published by the American Horticultural Society.

In 1997, AHS president H. Marc Cathey developed the AHS Plant Heat Zone Map as a complement to the USDA Plant Hardiness Zone Map. Its 12 zones are based on the average annual number of days with temperatures above 86 °F (30 °C), using National Weather Service records from 1974 to 1995.

== Publications ==
In addition to publishing horticultural reference books, the organization publishes a bi-monthly magazine, The American Gardener, which is a member benefit. The American Horticultural Society also publishes a monthly online e-bulletin.

== Education ==
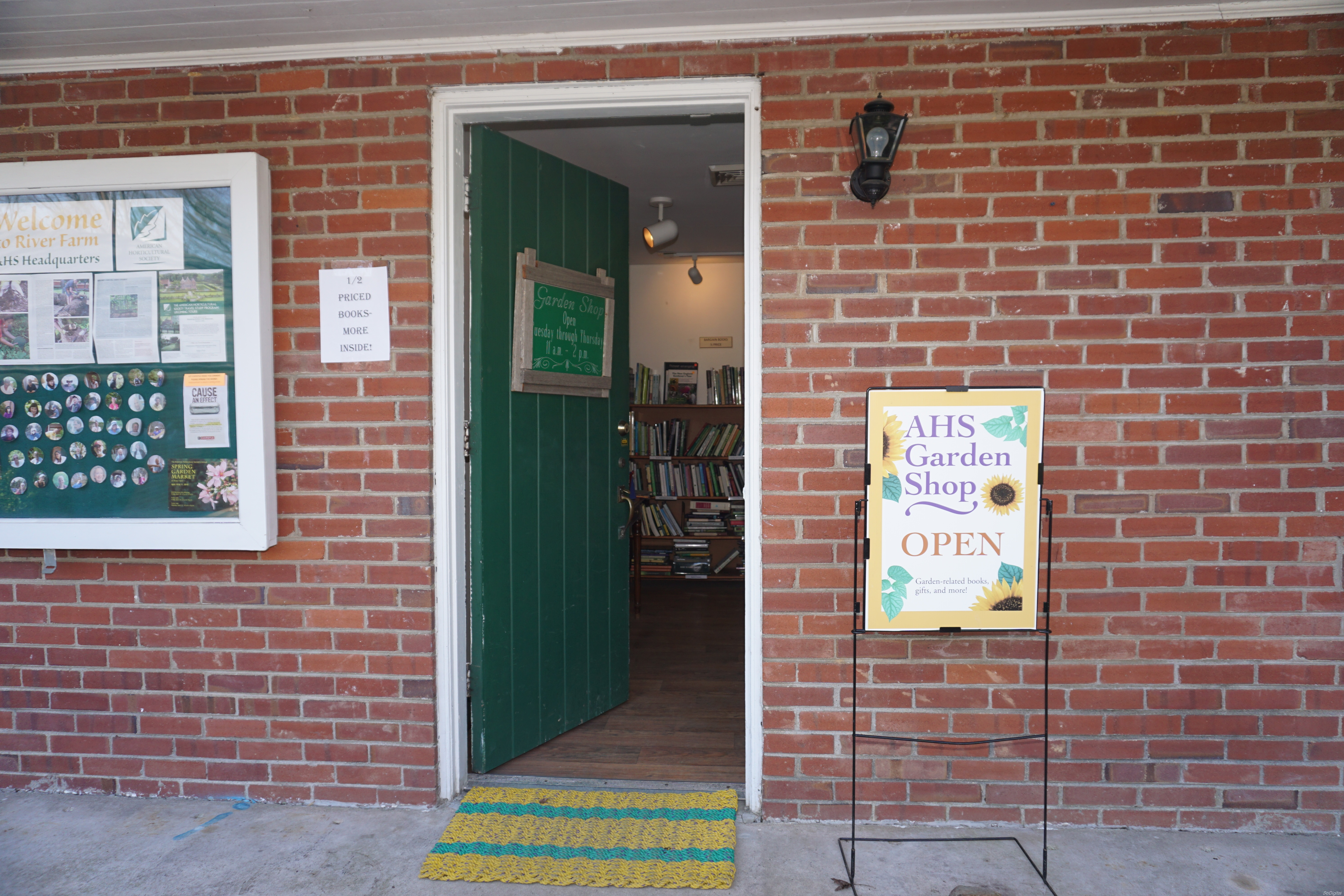
The AHS Garden Shop has many educational materials available.

The American Horticultural Society conducts various events annually, to educate and inspire gardeners. Each summer the AHS conducts the National Children and Youth Garden Symposium, which is a forum for educators, garden designers, community leaders, and children’s gardening advocates to network and collaborate on techniques and practices to engage children with the natural world.

Education is further instilled in the Society’s internship program, which hires interns in editorial/communications, member programs, and horticulture.

== National awards ==
Through its national awards programs, AHS celebrates outstanding achievements, encourages excellence, and inspires innovation in the art and science of horticulture. The Great American Gardeners Awards honor horticultural heroes; the AHS Book Awards celebrate great gardening literature, and Growing Good Kids Awards recognize outstanding children's gardening and nature books.

== River Farm ==
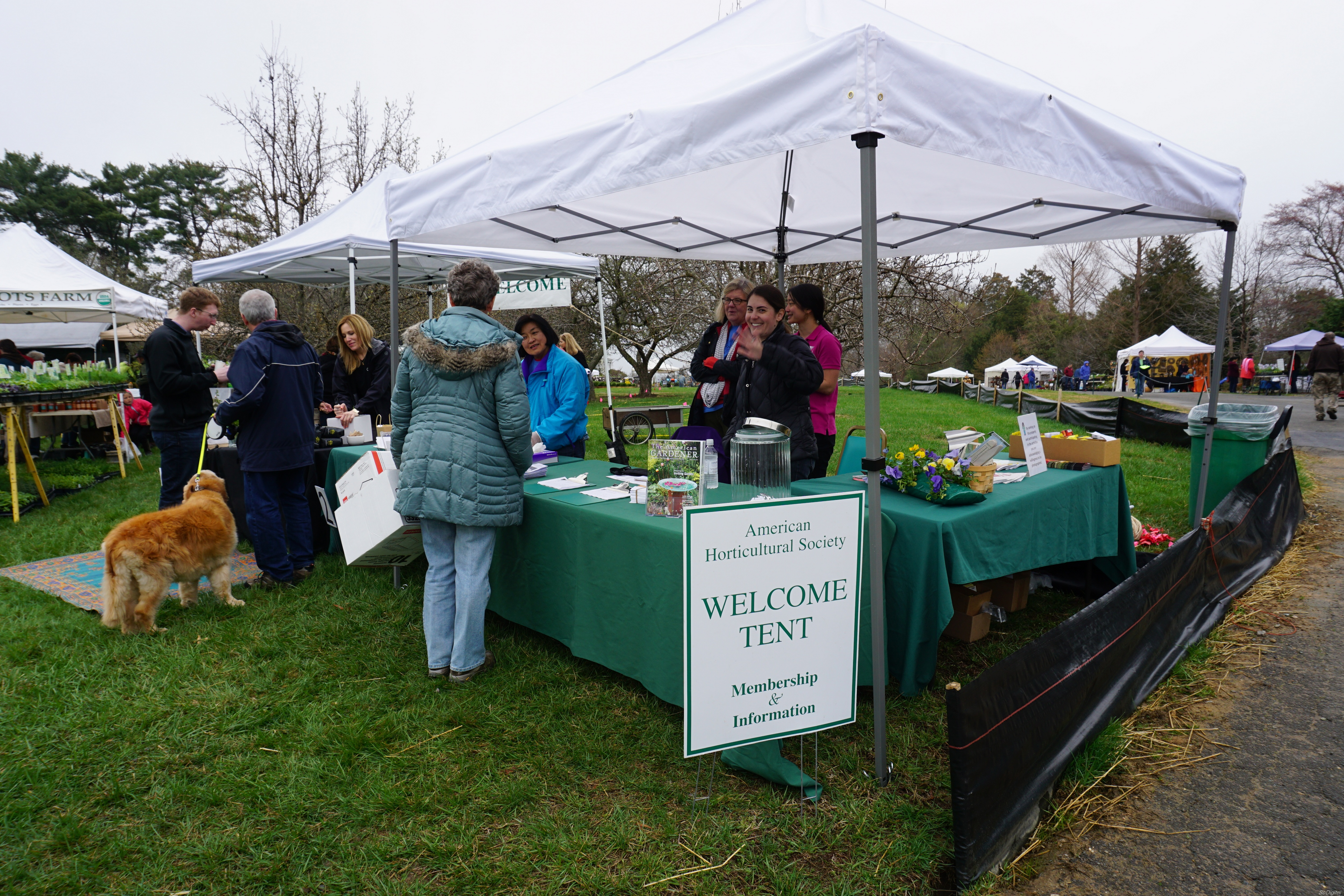
Events are held throughout the year at River Farm.

In 1973, the Society relocated their headquarters to River Farm, overlooking the Potomac River in Alexandria, Virginia. The property was acquired by the AHS with a gift from Enid Annenberg Haupt, who stipulated that the historic property, once part of George Washington's estate, would be open for the public to enjoy. The property is home to numerous gardens, including a four-acre Andre Bluemel Meadow and a Children's Garden. Annual events at River Farm include the Spring Garden Market plant sale, garden workshops for children, a banquet for AHS award winners, and a gala fundraiser each fall.

The Board of Directors of the AHS voted to sell the River Farm property in September 2020. Supporters of the sale argued that maintenance costs and financial pressures intensified by the COVID-19 pandemic were limiting the society's educational work. The property was subsequently listed for $32.9 million.

Five board members who supported the sale resigned in September 2021, leaving the board members who had opposed it in control of the organization. The following month, AHS removed River Farm from the market and announced that it would retain the property and reopen it to the public.

In 2026, AHS and the Northern Virginia Conservation Trust recorded a conservation easement over River Farm. The easement restricts future commercial and residential development while allowing AHS to retain ownership and continue using the grounds for public and educational purposes.

== Partners ==
The Horticultural and Corporate Partners programs join other allied organizations that help to support the Society's vision of making a nation of gardeners. In August 2020, the AHS partnered with Elodie's Naturals to teach skincare chemistry sourced from vegetables and plants.

== See also ==
- American Society for Horticultural Science (ASHS)
