= National Register of Historic Places listings in Alexandria, Virginia =

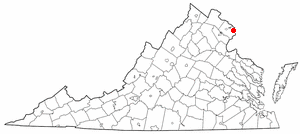
Location of Alexandria in Virginia

This is a list of the National Register of Historic Places listings in Alexandria, Virginia.

This is intended to be a complete list of the properties and districts on the National Register of Historic Places in the independent city of Alexandria, Virginia, United States. The locations of National Register properties and districts for which the latitude and longitude coordinates are included below, may be seen in an online map.

There are 52 properties and districts listed on the National Register in the city, including 7 National Historic Landmarks.

This National Park Service list is complete through NPS recent listings posted September 25, 2026.

== Current listings ==
	Name on the Register	Image	Date listed	Location	Description
1	Alexandria Canal Tide Lock	Alexandria Canal Tide Lock	January 15, 1980 (#80004305)	1 Canal Center Plaza; 38°48′50″N 77°02′19″W	
2	Alexandria City Hall	Alexandria City Hall	March 8, 1984 (#84003491)	301 King St. 38°48′20″N 77°02′35″W	
3	Alexandria Historic District	Alexandria Historic District	November 13, 1966 (#66000928)	Roughly bounded by Interstate 495, Patrick St., 2nd St., and the Potomac River; 38°48′14″N 77°02′50″W	
4	Alexandria National Cemetery	Alexandria National Cemetery	March 2, 1995 (#95000106)	1450 Wilkes St. 38°48′07″N 77°03′30″W	
5	Alexandria Union Station	Alexandria Union Station	February 27, 2013 (#13000044)	110 Callahan Dr. 38°48′23″N 77°03′44″W	
6	Alfred Street Baptist Church	Alfred Street Baptist Church	January 16, 2004 (#03001423)	313 S. Alfred St. 38°48′10″N 77°03′00″W	
7	Appomattox Statue	Appomattox Statue	June 12, 2017 (#100001066)	Junction of Prince and Washington Sts. 38°48′14″N 77°02′50″W	The statue was removed on June 2, 2020, during nationwide protests in which vandals damaged segregation-era statues following the May 2020 murder of George Floyd in Minneapolis, Minnesota.
8	Bank of Alexandria	Bank of Alexandria	June 4, 1973 (#73002202)	133 N. Fairfax St. 38°48′20″N 77°02′32″W	
9	Bank of Potomac Executive Office and Governor's Residence of the Restored Government of Virginia	Bank of Potomac Executive Office and Governor's Residence of the Restored Government of Virginia	January 28, 2025 (#100010198)	413-415½ Prince Street; 38°48′13″N 77°02′41″W	
10	Bayne-Fowle House	Bayne-Fowle House	November 6, 1986 (#86003136)	811 Prince St. 38°48′16″N 77°02′56″W	
11	Beulah Baptist Church	Beulah Baptist Church	January 16, 2004 (#03001424)	320 S. Washington St. 38°48′07″N 77°02′50″W	
12	Bruin's Slave Jail	Bruin's Slave Jail	August 14, 2000 (#00000890)	1707 Duke St. 38°48′16″N 77°03′35″W	
13	Carlyle House	Carlyle House	November 12, 1969 (#69000333)	121 N. Fairfax St. 38°48′19″N 77°02′31″W	
14	Christ Church	Christ Church	May 10, 1970 (#70000899)	Southeast corner of Cameron and Columbus Sts. 38°48′23″N 77°02′51″W	
15	Contrabands and Freedmen Cemetery	Contrabands and Freedmen Cemetery	August 15, 2012 (#12000516)	1001 S. Washington St. 38°47′40″N 77°02′59″W	
16	Davis Chapel	Davis Chapel	January 16, 2004 (#03001428)	606-A S. Washington St. 38°47′57″N 77°02′53″W	
17	Fairfax-Moore House	Fairfax-Moore House	January 17, 1991 (#90002113)	207 Prince St. 38°48′12″N 77°02′31″W	
18	President Gerald R. Ford, Jr. House	President Gerald R. Ford, Jr. House	December 17, 1985 (#85003048)	514 Crown View Dr. 38°48′47″N 77°04′47″W	
19	Fort Ward	Fort Ward	August 26, 1982 (#82004538)	4301 W. Braddock Rd. 38°49′50″N 77°06′08″W	
20	Franklin and Armfield Office	Franklin and Armfield Office	June 2, 1978 (#78003146)	1315 Duke St. 38°48′14″N 77°03′16″W	
21	Gadsby's Tavern	Gadsby's Tavern	October 15, 1966 (#66000913)	128 N. Royal St. 38°48′20″N 77°02′37″W	
22	Charles M. Goodman House	Charles M. Goodman House	May 28, 2013 (#13000334)	510 N. Quaker Ln. 38°48′51″N 77°05′25″W	
23	Moses Hepburn Rowhouses	Moses Hepburn Rowhouses	January 16, 2004 (#03001426)	206-212 N. Pitt St. 38°48′23″N 77°02′41″W	
24	Ivy Hill Cemetery	Ivy Hill Cemetery	April 1, 2025 (#100011604)	2823 King Street; 38°49′03″N 77°04′25″W	
25	Dr. Albert Johnson House	Dr. Albert Johnson House	January 16, 2004 (#03001422)	814 Duke St. 38°48′11″N 77°02′57″W	
26	Jones Point Lighthouse and District of Columbia South Cornerstone	Jones Point Lighthouse and District of Columbia South Cornerstone	May 19, 1980 (#80000352)	Jones Point Park; 38°47′26″N 77°02′26″W	
27	Robert E. Lee Boyhood Home	Robert E. Lee Boyhood Home	June 5, 1986 (#86001228)	607 Oronoco St. 38°48′35″N 77°02′43″W	
28	Lee-Fendall House	Lee-Fendall House	June 22, 1979 (#79003277)	614 Oronoco St. 38°48′34″N 77°02′45″W	
29	Lloyd House	Lloyd House	July 12, 1976 (#76002222)	220 N. Washington St. 38°48′26″N 77°02′48″W	
30	The Lyceum	The Lyceum	May 27, 1969 (#69000334)	201 S. Washington St. 38°48′14″N 77°02′51″W	
31	Mount Vernon Memorial Highway	Mount Vernon Memorial Highway	May 18, 1981 (#81000079)	Washington St. and George Washington Memorial Parkway; 38°48′25″N 77°03′00″W	Extends into Arlington and Fairfax counties
32	Oakland Baptist Cemetery	Oakland Baptist Cemetery	September 4, 2018 (#100002883)	4195 W. Braddock Rd. 38°49′48″N 77°06′02″W	African-American cemetery associated with Fort Ward.
33	Odd Fellows Hall	Odd Fellows Hall	January 16, 2004 (#03001427)	411 S. Columbus St. 38°48′06″N 77°02′57″W	
34	Old Dominion Bank Building	Old Dominion Bank Building	March 20, 1980 (#80004307)	201 Prince St. 38°48′12″N 77°02′31″W	
35	Orange and Alexandria Railroad Hooff's Run Bridge	Orange and Alexandria Railroad Hooff's Run Bridge	August 7, 2003 (#03000740)	Jamieson Ave. at Hooff's Run; 38°48′11″N 77°03′30″W	
36	Old Presbyterian Meeting House	Old Presbyterian Meeting House	February 16, 2001 (#01000143)	321 S. Fairfax St. 38°48′06″N 77°02′36″W	
37	Parkfairfax Historic District	Parkfairfax Historic District	February 22, 1999 (#99000146)	Bounded by Quaker Ln., Interstate 395, Beverley Dr., Wellington Rd., Gunston Rd., Virginialley Dr., Glebe Rd. and Four-mile Run; 38°50′12″N 77°04′48″W	
38	Protestant Episcopal Theological Seminary	Protestant Episcopal Theological Seminary	November 17, 1980 (#80004166)	3737 Seminary Rd. 38°49′14″N 77°05′31″W	
39	Rosemont Historic District	Rosemont Historic District	September 24, 1992 (#92001275)	Roughly bounded by Commonwealth Ave., W. Walnut St., Russell Rd., Rucker Pl., and King St. 38°48′39″N 77°03′38″W	
40	St. Paul's Episcopal Church	St. Paul's Episcopal Church	May 9, 1985 (#85000987)	228 S. Pitt St. 38°48′11″N 77°02′41″W	
41	George Lewis Seaton House	George Lewis Seaton House	January 16, 2004 (#03001425)	404 S. Royal St. 38°48′03″N 77°02′39″W	
42	Southwest No. 1 Boundary Marker of the Original District of Columbia	Southwest No. 1 Boundary Marker of the Original District of Columbia	February 1, 1991 (#91000006)	1220 Wilkes St. 38°48′05″N 77°03′16″W	
43	Southwest No. 2 Boundary Marker of the Original District of Columbia	Southwest No. 2 Boundary Marker of the Original District of Columbia	February 1, 1991 (#91000007)	7 Russell Rd., on its eastern side, north of the junction with King St. 38°48′28″N 77°03′46″W	
44	Southwest No. 3 Boundary Marker of the Original District of Columbia	Southwest No. 3 Boundary Marker of the Original District of Columbia	February 1, 1991 (#91000008)	2952 King St. 38°49′14″N 77°04′46″W	
45	Southwest No. 4 Boundary Marker of the Original District of Columbia	Southwest No. 4 Boundary Marker of the Original District of Columbia	February 1, 1991 (#91000009)	King St. north of the junction with Wakefield St. 38°49′54″N 77°05′35″W	Extends into Arlington County
46	Southwest No. 5 Boundary Marker of the Original District of Columbia	Southwest No. 5 Boundary Marker of the Original District of Columbia	February 1, 1991 (#91000010)	Northeast of the junction of King St. and Walter Reed Dr. 38°50′31″N 77°06′24″W	Extends into Arlington County
47	Stabler-Leadbeater Apothecary Shop	Stabler-Leadbeater Apothecary Shop	November 24, 1982 (#82001796)	105-107 S. Fairfax; 38°48′16″N 77°02′34″W	Designated a National Historic Landmark in 2021.
48	Swann-Daingerfield House	Swann-Daingerfield House	May 23, 2019 (#100003979)	712 Prince St. 38°48′14″N 77°02′53″W	
49	Town of Potomac	Town of Potomac	September 10, 1992 (#92001186)	Roughly bounded by Commonwealth Ave., U.S. Route 1, E. Bellefonte Ave., and Ashby Ave. 38°49′29″N 77°03′26″W	
50	Uptown-Parker-Gray Historic District	Uptown-Parker-Gray Historic District	January 12, 2010 (#09001232)	Roughly Cameron St. north to 1st St. and N. Columbus St.; west to the following streets forming west line: Buchanan St. and N. West St. 38°48′33″N 77°02′57″W	
51	George Washington High School	George Washington High School	May 26, 2021 (#100005803)	1005 Mount Vernon Ave. 38°48′56″N 77°03′23″W	Now a middle school.
52	George Washington Masonic National Memorial	George Washington Masonic National Memorial	July 21, 2015 (#15000622)	101 Callahan St. 38°48′27″N 77°03′58″W	Neoclassical tower is one of the largest private memorials to Washington, reflecting the Masonic involvement of many of the Founding Fathers

== See also ==
- List of National Historic Landmarks in Virginia
- National Register of Historic Places listings in Virginia
- National Register of Historic Places listings in Fairfax County, Virginia
