= First Free School Society of Alexandria =

The First Free School Society of Alexandria was a 19th-century organization that provided financial support for the development of schools for African Americans in Alexandria, Virginia.

== History ==
The First Free School Society of Alexandria was established for the purpose of supporting the creation of schools for Africans American students in Alexandria, Virginia. The society helped to raise funds needed for the construction of local schools, including the Snowden School for Boys and the Hallowell School for Girls. Both schools opened in 1867.

The society is honored on Alexandria's African American Heritage Memorial.

== Trustees ==
- George L. Seaton
- George W. Bryant
- Anthony L. Perpener
- Hannibal King
- James Piper
- George P. Douglas
- John H. Davis
- Samuel W. Madden
- J. Mck. Ware
- Charles Watson
- George W. Parker
- Rev. Clem Robinson
- George W. Sims
