= Fowle House =

Fowle House may refer to:

- Fowle-Reed-Wyman House, Arlington, Massachusetts
- Edmund Fowle House, Watertown, Massachusetts
- Bayne–Fowle House, Alexandria, Virginia
