= Snowden School for Boys =

Snowden School for Boys was the first public school for African American boys in Alexandria, Virginia.

== History ==
In 1867, the Freedmen's Bureau funded the construction of a school for African American boys in Alexandria, Virginia. The Bureau contracted George L. Seaton, a local carpenter to build the school. Seaton, who was also a real estate holder and education advocate, helped raise funds to purchase the school's lot through the First Free School Society of Alexandria.

The school opened in April 1867 and was incorporated into the Alexandria school system making it the first public school for African American boys in Alexandria. It was located on South Pitt Street between Gibbon and Franklin Streets. The school's official name was the Snowden School for Boys, but was also known in the community as the Seaton School.

Snowden School for Boys merged with the Hallowell School for Girls in 1920. The new school was named Parker-Gray.
