= Unknown Confederate Soldier of Gray, Maine =

Unidentified Confederate soldier

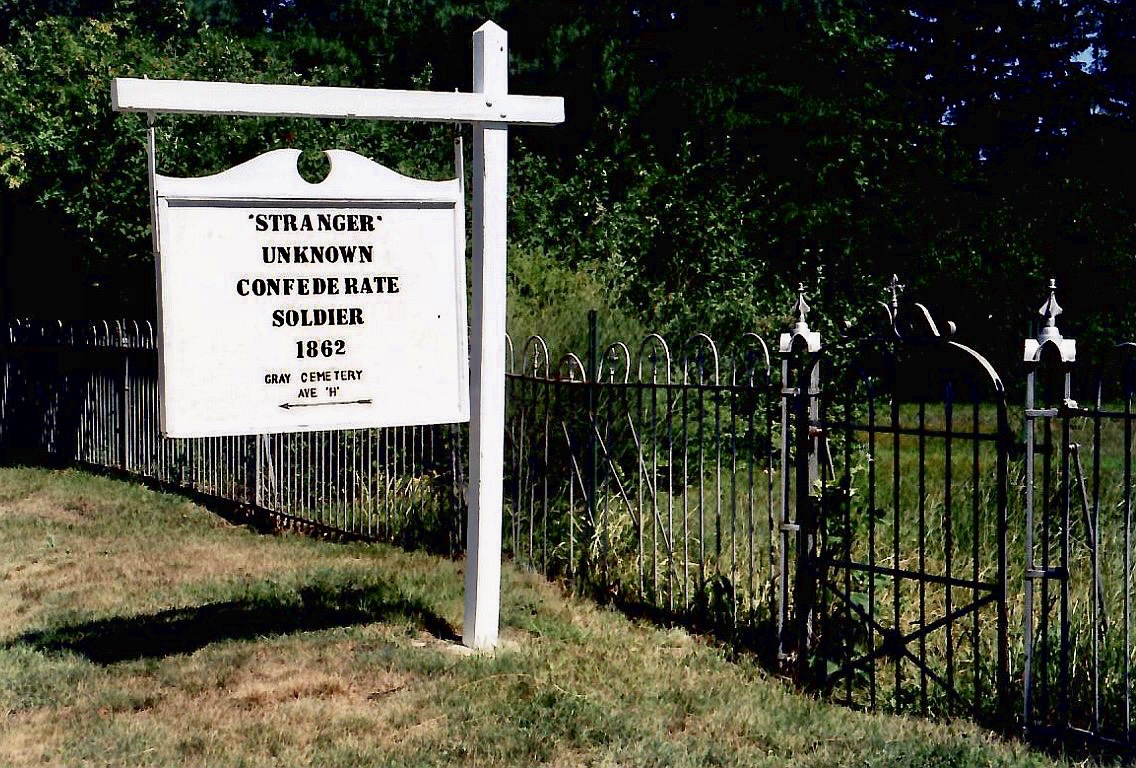
Unknown Confederate Gray Maine

The Unknown Confederate Soldier of Gray, Maine is an unidentified uniformed man whose body was mistakenly sent to the family of fallen Union soldier Charles H. Colley in Gray, Maine in 1862 during the American Civil War.

Colley, who died of wounds received at the Battle of Cedar Mountain, has headstones at both Gray Village Cemetery in Maine and Alexandria National Cemetery in Virginia. The Confederate remains unidentified. The “ladies of Gray” buried the unknown enemy soldier, called “Stranger,” and paid for a headstone marking his grave.

== Background ==
“Colley was one of about 200 other soldiers from Gray, a town of 1,500 people that sent proportionately more of its native sons to battle than any other Maine community.” There are 178 Union burials at Gray’s historic town cemetery. There are at least 45 other Colleys buried alongside Charles Colley at Gray Village Cemetery.

Maine was a traditional hotbed of abolitionism; despite its status as a staunchly pro-Union state, there are seven Confederates buried there, including a second alleged “unknown.”

== Colley ==
Charles H. Colley of Gray was a 29-year-old soldier of Company B of the 10th Maine Infantry Regiment who was mortally wounded at the Battle of Cedar Mountain on Saturday, August 9, 1862. “In about 10 minutes one day—August 9 in the late afternoon—the 10th Maine surged forward and lost half its men in killed, wounded and missing.”

He was a sergeant at the time of his wounding and was promoted to lieutenant days before he died of sepsis on Saturday, September 20, six weeks after the battle.

“During the war, funeral directors loitered around the hospitals, offering to embalm the dead—for a price, of course. Colley’s grieving mother Sally arranged to have her son’s body embalmed and shipped by rail back to Gray.” The Stranger arrived instead.

Colley has a marker at Alexandria National Cemetery (Virginia) as well. His rank on the Alexandria marker is listed as Sgt. while on the Gray marker it is recorded as Lt.

It remains unclear which grave contains Colley’s remains. Either or both could be a cenotaph or even contain the body of a third incorrectly identified American Civil War combatant.

== Stranger ==
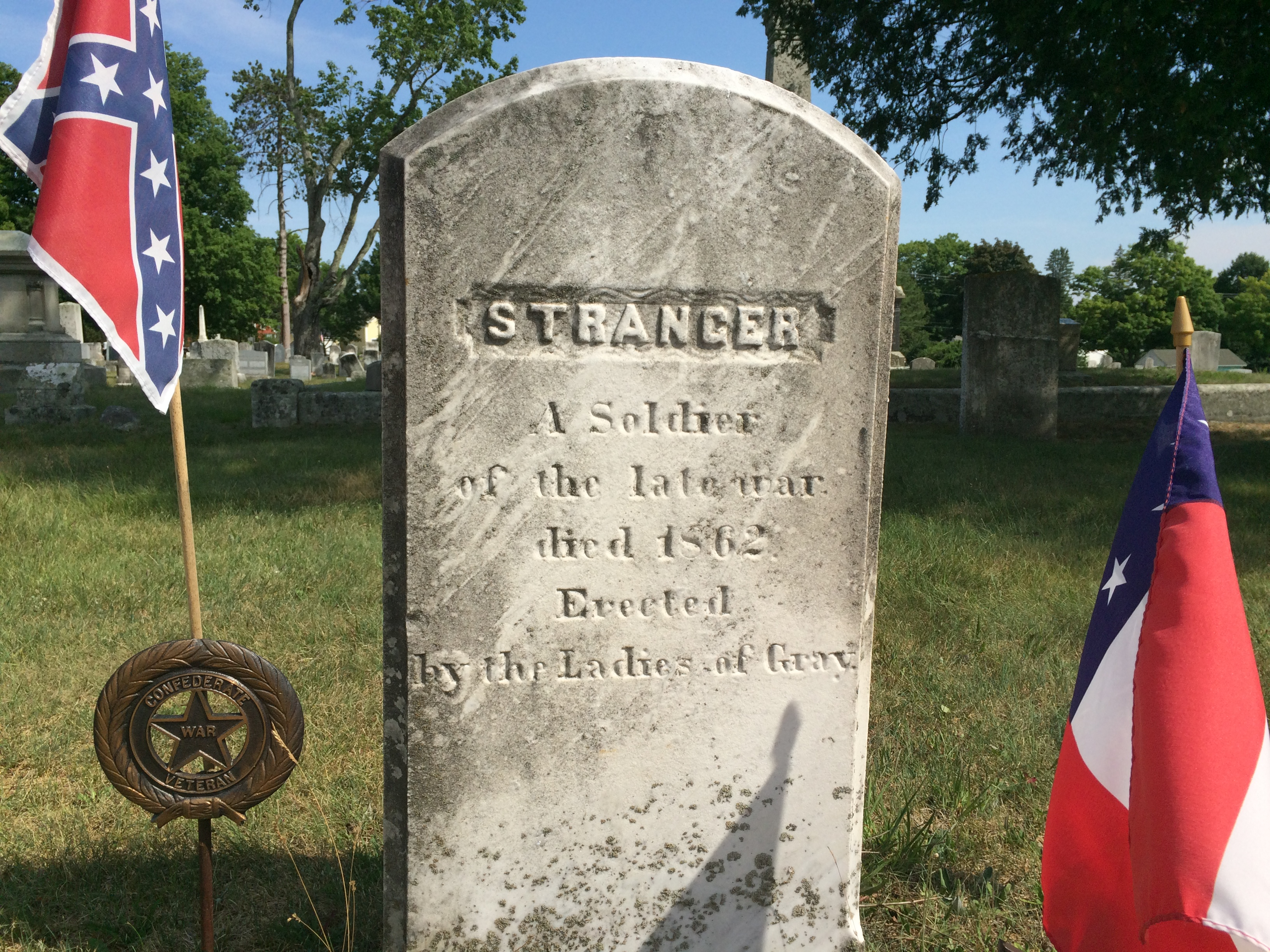
The Stranger’s grave marker

The unknown lies buried about 100 ft (30 m) away from Colley. Since 1956, a Confederate flag has been placed beside his headstone on Memorial Day. Two Southern women sent the first flag and persuaded the town to place it at his grave. The Daughters of the Confederacy continued the tradition in later years.

Ayer, asked that a Confederate flag be put "on your unknown boy's grave as a token from those of us who cherish the memory of the men in Confederate graves." Mrs. Scott wrote that "such gestures as yours at Gray have gone far toward healing the grievances that grew out of our Civil War—grievances that were felt so personally for such a long time during the 91 years now since Appomattox."

— Confederate Flags Flutter Over Grave of Gray's Rebel Stranger for the first time.(1956)

In 2015, someone removed the Confederate banner at the Stranger’s grave and replaced it overnight with two American flags.

== See also ==
- Maine in the Civil War
