= Robert E. Lee Boyhood Home =

Historic house in Virginia, United States

- U.S. National Register of Historic Places
- Virginia Landmarks Register
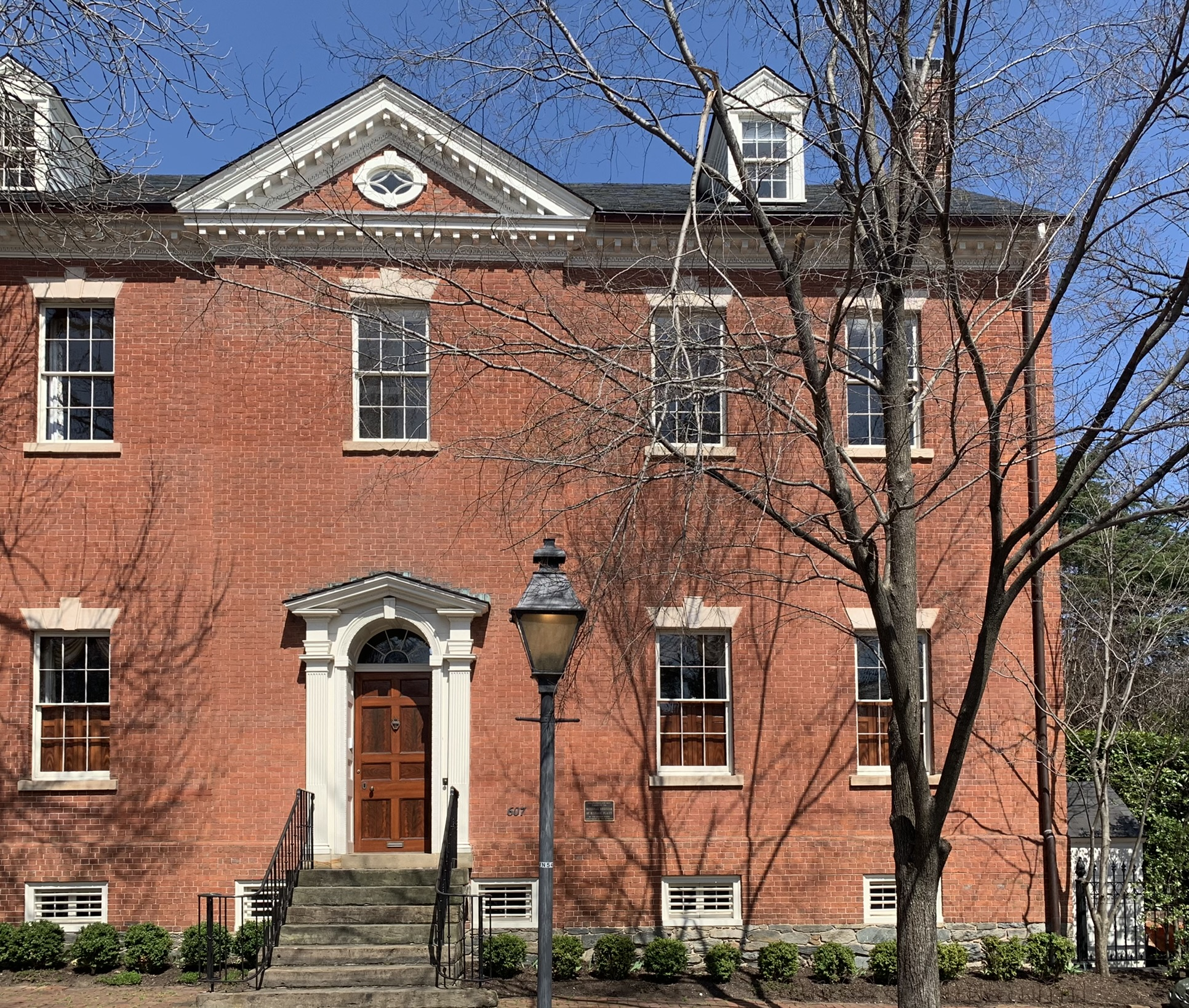
- Robert E. Lee Boyhood Home in 2022

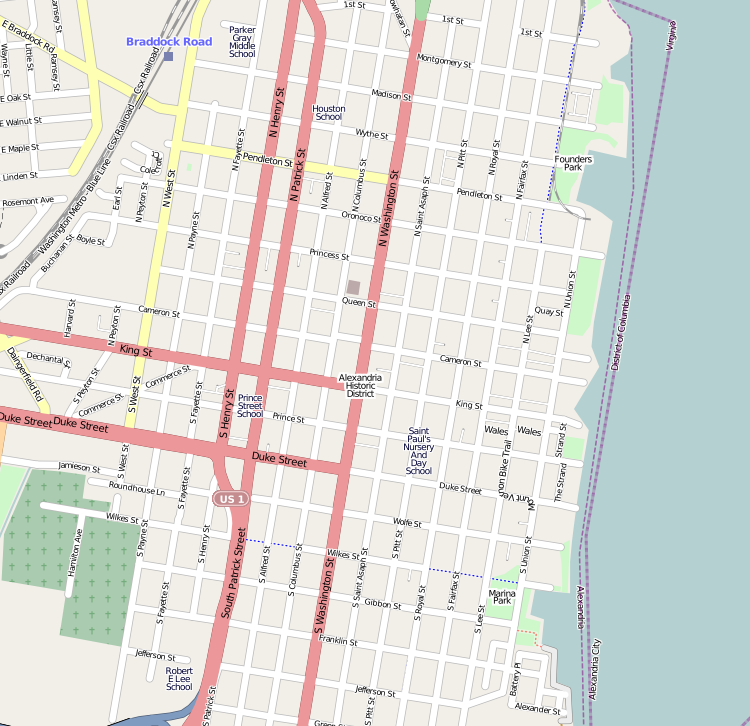
- Location within Alexandria Historical District Location within Virginia Location within the United States
- Location: 607 Oronoco Street, Alexandria, Virginia
- Coordinates: 38°48′35″N 77°2′44″W
- Area: less than one acre
- Built: 1795
- Architectural style: Federal
- NRHP reference No.: 86001228
- VLR No.: 100-0082

Significant dates
- Added to NRHP: June 05, 1986
- Designated VLR: December 17, 1985

The Potts-Fitzhugh House (also called the Robert E. Lee Boyhood Home) is a historic house at 607 Oronoco Street, Alexandria, Virginia. It served in the early 1800s as the home of Anne Hill Carter Lee and her family, including Robert E. Lee. It should not be confused with the Lee–Fendall House, which is located at 614 Oronoco Street.

== Location and description ==
The home is in Old Town Alexandria. The intersection of North Washington Street and Oronoco Street in Alexandria is called "Lee Corner" because several properties in the area were owned by the extended Lee family. It is across the street from the Lee–Fendall House, which operates as a museum and garden.

The home is in the Federal and Georgian styles; it is made of brick with white trim and sits on a half-acre lot. It has 6 bedrooms and 4.5 bathrooms; it is 8,145 square feet.

A historical marker is outside the home.

== History ==
It first owner was John Potts, Jr., who built the house in 1795. The house was built simultaneously with its neighboring structure at 609 Oronoco Street, which became the Hallowell School (Benjamin Hallowell tutored Robert E. Lee as he prepared to enter West Point.) Potts was the Secretary of the Potomac Canal Company under George Washington, the company's president. Washington dined at the house. The second owner was William Henry Fitzhugh. The Marquis de Lafayette visited in 1824 during his visit to the United States.

The home was rented by Fitzhugh to his relative, Henry Lee III ("Light-Horse Harry"), in 1811, at a time when Alexandria was still part of the District of Columbia. After being beaten in the 1812 Baltimore riots, Lee left the country and moved to the Caribbean, leaving his wife Anne Hill Carter Lee to raise their children (including Robert E. Lee). The family lived at the home until 1816, and in 1820, the now-widowed Anne moved back into the home with her children. The house was the boyhood home of Robert E. Lee, who was born at the family's Stratford Hall plantation in Montross, Virginia, and lived at the Potts-Fitzhugh House until he left for West Point in 1825. Lee later became a Confederate general.

Notable later residents includes Royd Sayer, the head of the Bureau of Mines under Franklin D. Roosevelt, and Ada Hitchcock MacLeish, who helped create the United Nations with her husband Archibald MacLeish, a poet and Librarian of Congress.

The home is on the U.S. National Register of Historic Places and the Virginia Landmarks Register. It was added to both registers in 1979.

The home was operated as a museum from 1967 to 2000, when the Lee-Jackson Foundation, the nonprofit that operated the museum, sold the site to Mark Kington, a managing director at a venture capital firm, and his wife Ann. It then again became a residence. It was sold again in July 2020 for $4.7 million, and was then offered for sale again in 2021.

The home is among the oldest extant homes in Alexandria; a handful of other structures are older, namely the Ramsay House (built 1695–1751) (today, the Alexandria Visitor Center), Carlyle House (1753), Murray-Dick-Fawcett House (1775), Benjamin Dulany House (1784-1785), Colonel Michael Swope House (1784-1786), Fairfax-Moore-Montague House (mid-1780s), and the Lee-Fendall House (1785).
