= Lloyd House (Alexandria, Virginia) =

Historic house in Virginia, United States

- U.S. National Register of Historic Places
- Virginia Landmarks Register
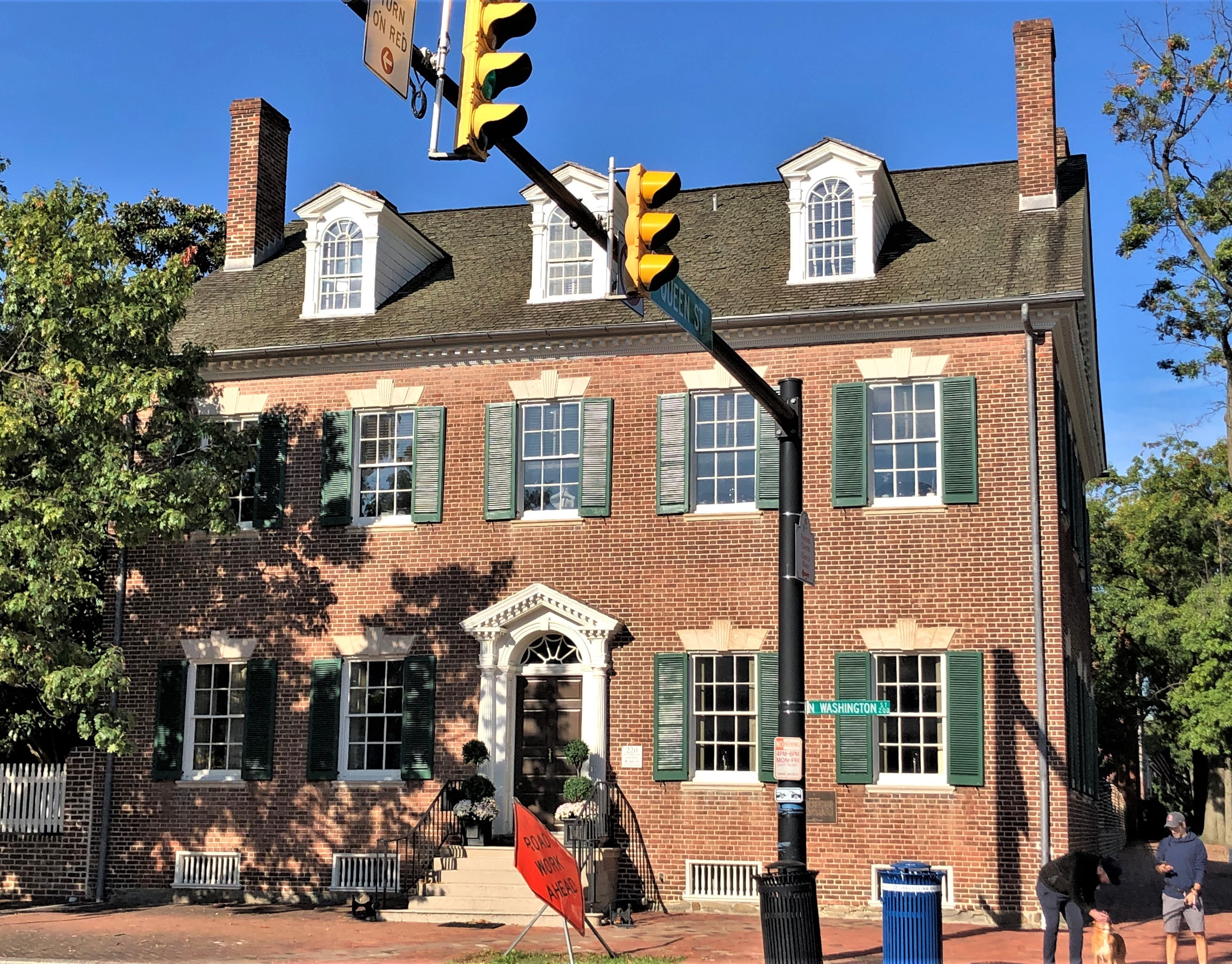
- (2021)

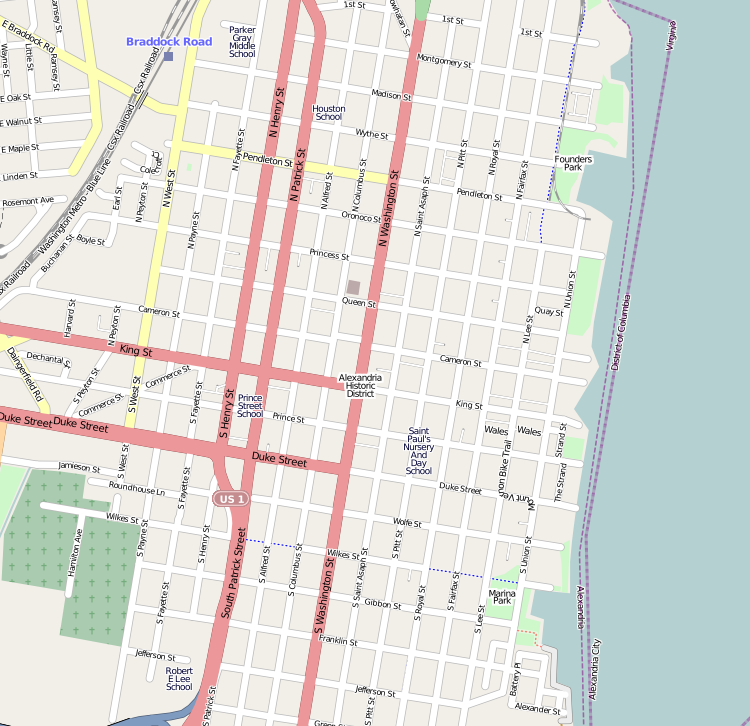
- Location within Alexandria Historical District Location within Virginia Location within the United States
- Location: 220 N. Washington St., Alexandria, Virginia
- Coordinates: 38°48′25″N 77°2′49″W
- Area: less than one acre
- Built: 1796
- Architectural style: Georgian
- NRHP reference No.: 76002222
- VLR No.: 100-0090

Significant dates
- Added to NRHP: July 12, 1976
- Designated VLR: February 17, 1976

The Lloyd House, also known as the Wise-Hooe-Lloyd House, is a historic house and library located at 220 North Washington Street at the corner of Queen Street in the Old Town area of Alexandria, Virginia. It was built from 1796 to 1797 by John Wise, a prominent entrepreneur, in the late eighteenth-century Georgian architectural style. The house was added to the National Register of Historic Places on July 12, 1976.

== History ==
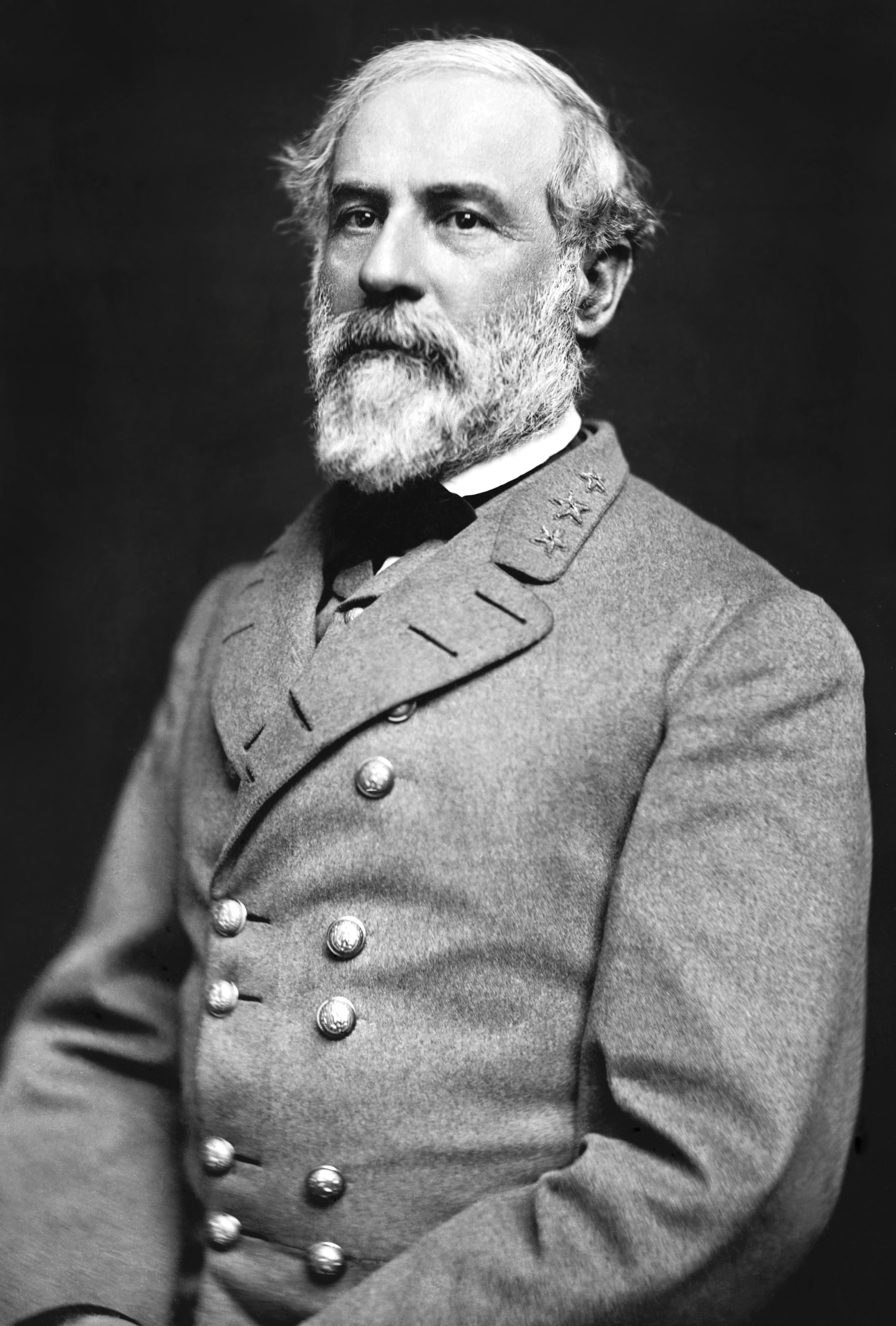
Robert E. Lee who was a student at Lloyd House when it was a school in the 1820s.

The Lloyd House was built in 1796–97 by John Wise. It was a high status building and President George Washington was a guest there on one occasion. In 1810, Wise sold the house to Jacob Hoffman, who would later become Mayor of Alexandria. In 1824, Hoffman sold the home to James Hooe for $13,000. After his death in 1826, his widow rented out the house to an educator, Benjamin Hallowell, who used the building as a schoolhouse. When Hooe's widow died in 1831, it was sold to John Lloyd. John Lloyd's wife was the cousin of Robert E. Lee, who had been a student at the school. The Lloyd family owned the property for over 100 years until the 1930s. During the 1940s and 1950s, it fell into ruin, and in 1956 proposals were made to gut the building; there were opposed by the Historic Alexandria Foundation. A businessman from Wyoming, Robert V. New, bought the house, saving it from being destroyed, and financed its major renovation. Fully restored, in 1968 Lloyd House was sold to the City of Alexandria.

Lloyd House currently serves as the administrative headquarters for the Office of Historic Alexandria, a department of the City of Alexandria government. The department is dedicated to the collection and preservation of historic sites, and since 1976 the building has also housed important historical and genealogical collections which are part of the Alexandria Library. Shelving space was tripled at Lloyd House in order to store the collection which has over 4,000 books.

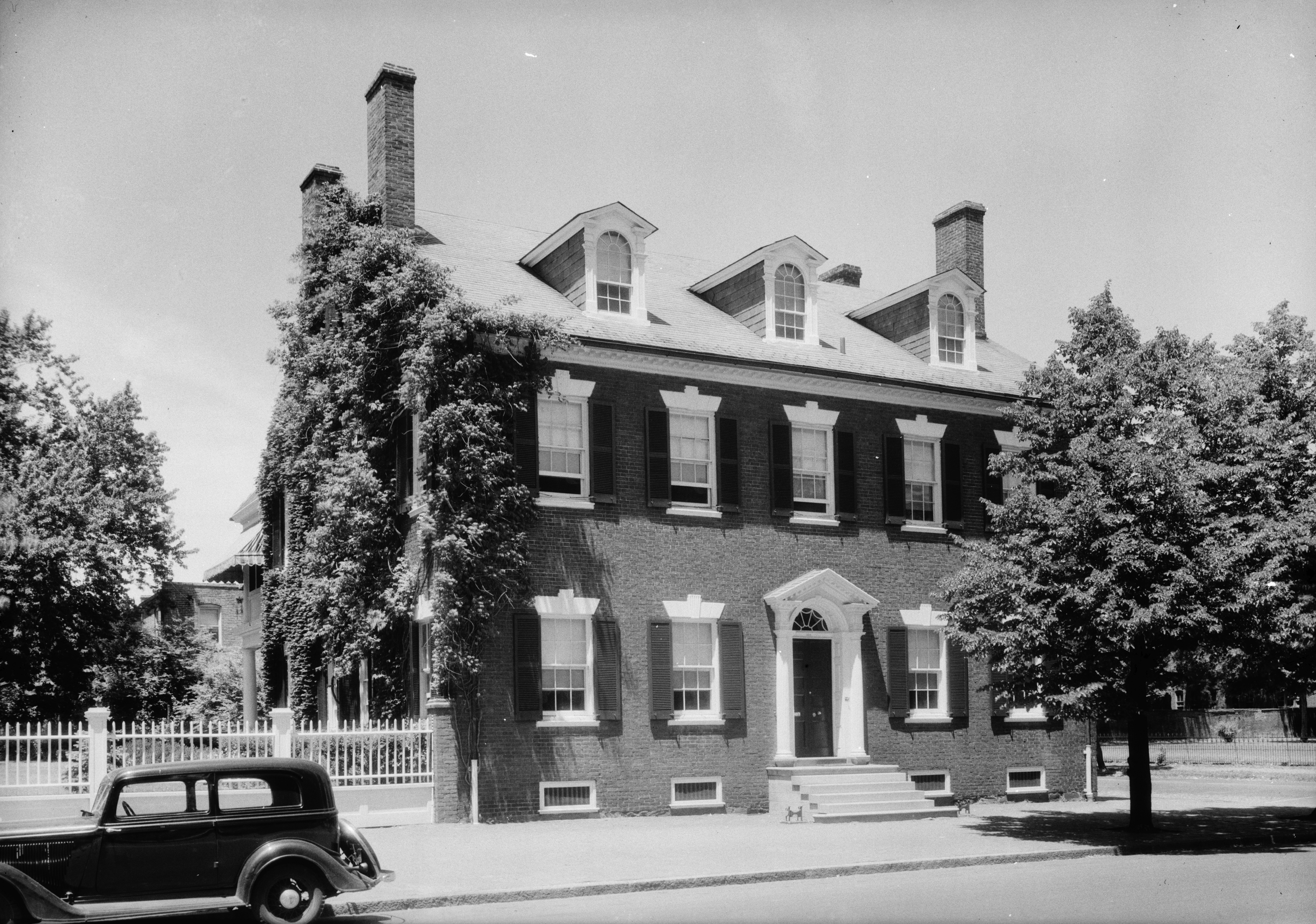
A photo of the house from the Historic American Buildings Survey

== Architecture ==
The Lloyd House is characteristic of the early post-colonial style in Virginia and is a fine example of Federal domestic architecture. It is a two-story rectangular brick building with a five-bay front on the Washington street side, four chimneys, and a gabled roof with three dormers. The central entrance is solid wood and is flanked by two Doric pilasters. When the house was renovated in the early 1960s, the original 18th-century Flemish bond masonry on the exterior was damaged and repainted with Portland cement and the original interior pine boards were covered with painted hardwood flooring.

== Archives ==
Lloyd House has a complete collection of the Virginia census from 1790 to 1920 and related material and information on Virginia's county and city histories and genealogies. It also has African-American research materials such as the published Fairfax County and Alexandria Free Negro Registers, published records on births, obituaries, cemeteries, wills, deeds and marriage indexes, unpublished Alexandria church records, tax records, microfilm and a collection of over 9,000 Alexandria photographs and maps. Rooms of the house can also be rented for wedding receptions, conferences etc.

== See also ==
- National Register of Historic Places listings in Alexandria, Virginia
