= Fairfax–Moore House =

Historic house in Virginia, United States

- U.S. National Register of Historic Places
- Virginia Landmarks Register
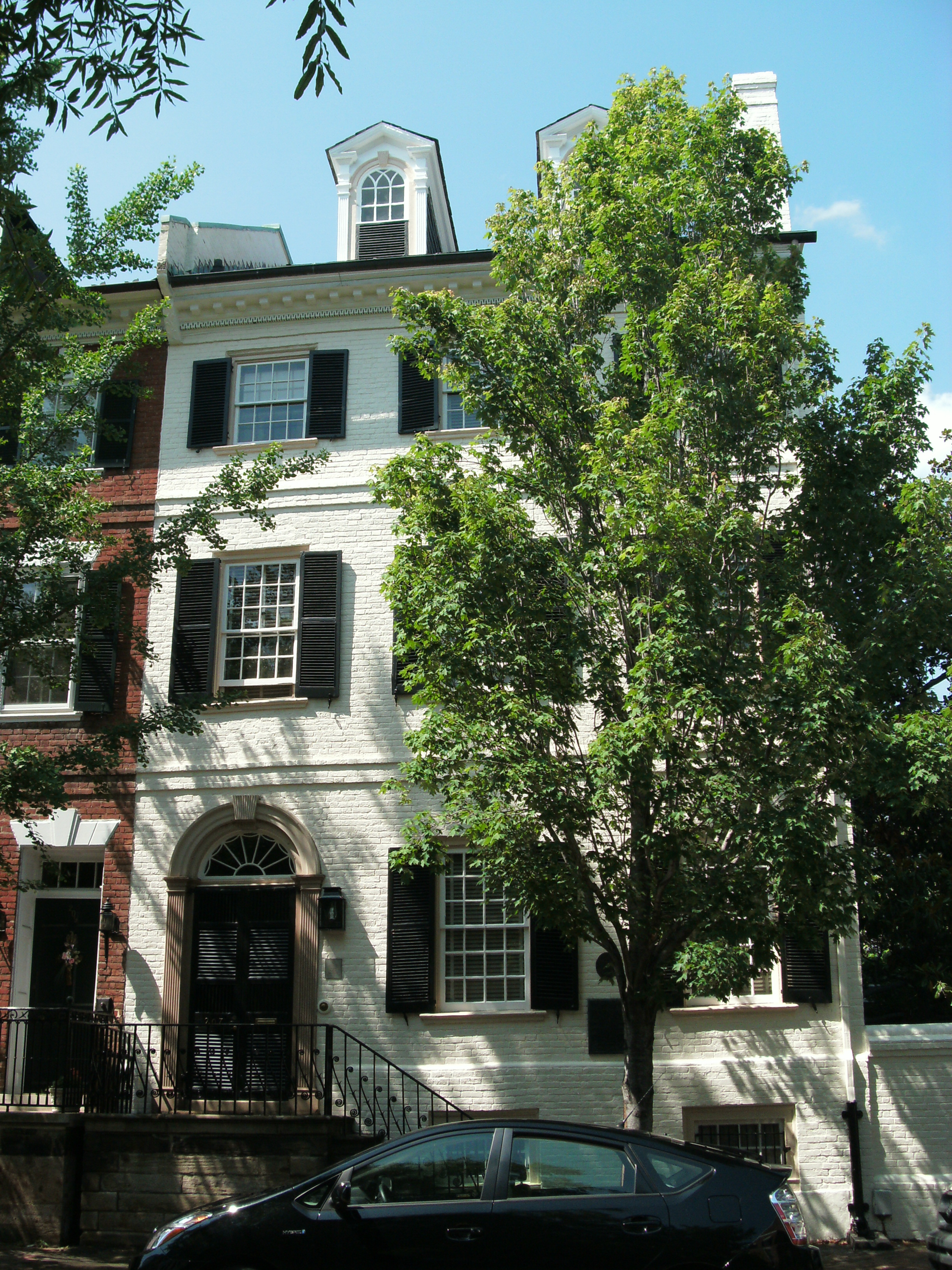
- Fairfax–Moore House

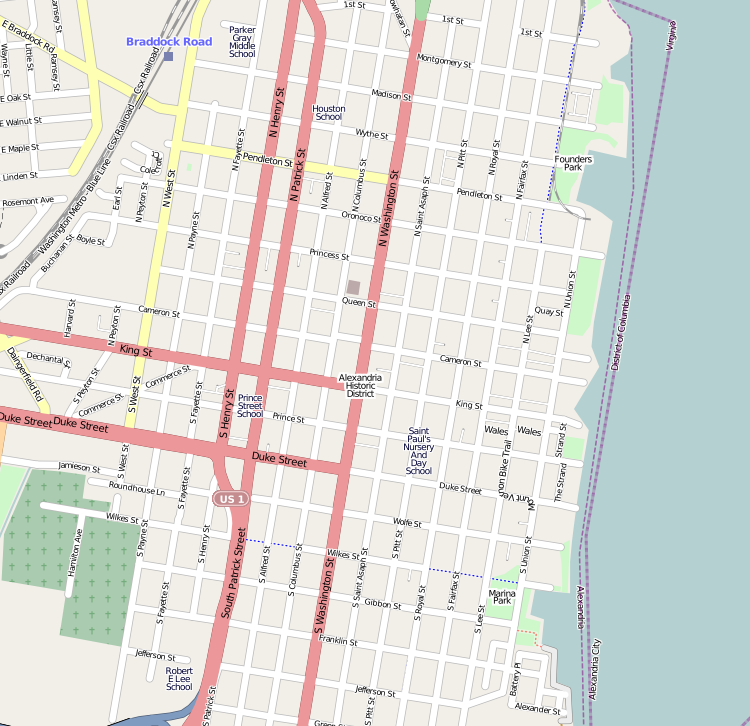
- Location within Alexandria Historical District Location within Virginia Location within the United States
- Location: 207 Prince Street, Alexandria, Virginia
- Coordinates: 38°48′12″N 77°2′34″W
- Built: Late 18th century
- Architectural style: Georgian
- NRHP reference No.: 90002113
- VLR No.: 100-0022

Significant dates
- Added to NRHP: January 17, 1991
- Designated VLR: April 17, 1990

The Fairfax–Moore House is a historical house located at 207 Prince Street in Alexandria, Virginia, United States. It was added to the National Register of Historic Places on January 17, 1991. The home is noted to its 18th-century Georgian architectural style. To the home's east is the Athenaeum, which is separated from the house by a geometric boxwood garden.

== History ==
The date of construction is unclear; the main part of the house may have been constructed by Captain John Harper in the 1780s. The lot was originally owned by George William Fairfax.

The Georgian-style townhouse is three stories and has a rear ell. Preservationist Gay Montague Moore lived in the home from 1919 until her death in 1988. It is part of the Alexandria Historic District, to which it is a contributing structure.

The NRHP nomination form for the home notes that the home's "refined proportions, three-and-a-half-story elevation, side-hall plan, and service ell ... symbolizes the sophistication of Alexandria's late-eighteenth-century urban domestic idiom."

== See also ==
- National Register of Historic Places listings in Alexandria, Virginia
