= Hallowell School for Girls =

All-girls school

Hallowell School for Girls was the first public school for African American girls in Alexandria, Virginia.

== History ==
In 1867, the Freedmen's Bureau funded the construction of a school for African American girls in Alexandria, Virginia. The Bureau contracted George L. Seaton, a local carpenter to build the school. Seaton, a real estate holder and education advocate, also helped raise funds for the school's lot through the Free School Society of Alexandria.

The school opened in November 1867 and was named the Hallowell School for Girls. It was incorporated into the Alexandria school system making it the first public school for African American girls in Alexandria. The Hallowell School for Girls was located North Alfred Street, between Princess and Oronoco Streets.

Hallowell School for Girls merged with the Snowden School for Boys in 1920. The new school was named Parker-Gray.

== See also ==
- Alexandria City Public Schools
