= Dr. Albert Johnson House =

Historic house in Virginia, United States

- U.S. National Register of Historic Places
- Virginia Landmarks Register
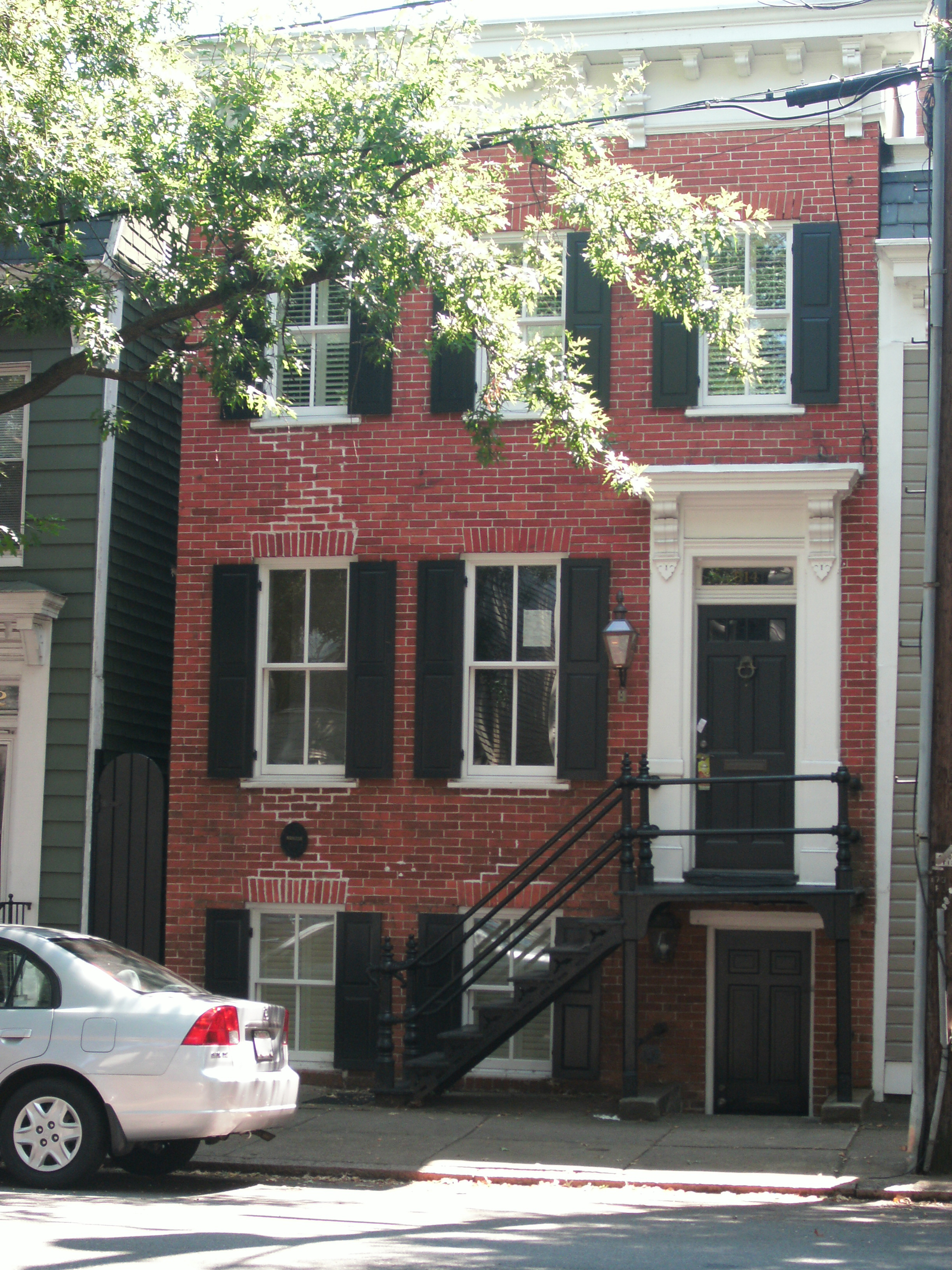

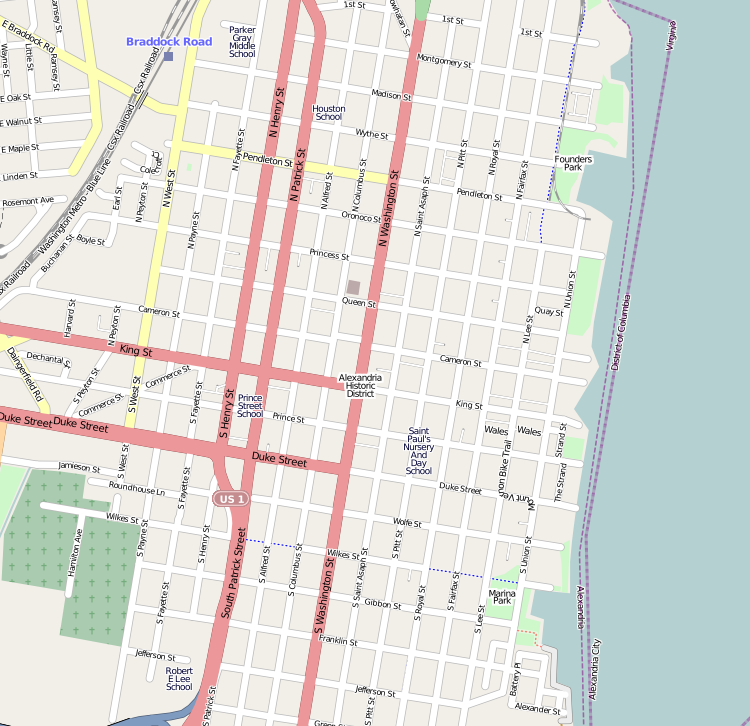
- Location within Alexandria Historical District Location within Virginia Location within the United States
- Location: 814 Duke Street, Alexandria, Virginia
- Coordinates: 38°48′10.43″N 77°2′57.13″W
- Built: 19th century
- MPS: African American Historic Resources of Alexandria, Virginia MPS
- NRHP reference No.: 03001422
- VLR No.: 100-5015-0003

Significant dates
- Added to NRHP: January 16, 2004
- Designated VLR: September 10, 2003

The Dr. Albert Johnson House is a historical house located at 814 Duke Street in the Bottoms neighborhood of Alexandria, Virginia, United States. It was added to the National Register of Historic Places on January 16, 2004.

A 19th-century building in the Italianate townhouse style, it is noted for being the place where Dr. Albert Johnson, one of the first licensed African-American physicians in Alexandria once lived and held his practice.

The townhouse is a two-story, north facing building which consists of three bays, a side-hall building with a raised basement. It underwent renovation in 1974.

== See also ==
- National Register of Historic Places listings in Alexandria, Virginia
