= Moses Hepburn =

American politician and businessperson (1832–1897)

Moses Garrison Hepburn
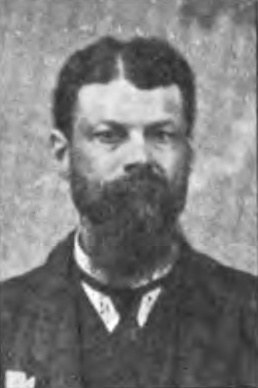
- Born: c. 1832; Alexandria, Virginia, US
- Died: December 1, 1897 (aged 64–65); West Chester, Pennsylvania, US
- Occupations: Politician, innkeeper, businessperson
- Known for: First African American town councilor of West Chester
- Political party: Republican Party

Moses Garrison Hepburn Jr. (c. 1832 – December 1, 1897) was an American politician, innkeeper, and businessman elected as the first African American town councilor of West Chester, Pennsylvania, in 1882. In 1866, he founded the Magnolia House, the borough's only inn catering to African Americans, where he hosted Frederick Douglass and other Black luminaries.

== Early life and family ==
His father, also Moses Hepburn, was the natural son of William Hepburn, a wealthy white slaveholder, and Esther, an enslaved woman, both from Alexandria, Virginia. His slaveholder father manumitted the mother and son and provided for them in his will. Moses Hepburn Sr. consequently became the wealthiest African American in Northern Virginia and erected the historic Moses Hepburn Rowhouses in Alexandria in 1856. When Hepburn Jr. was born in 1832, his father sent him to Pennsylvania to receive an education. The family moved to West Chester in 1853 after the US government retroceded Alexandria to Virginia in 1847. Virginia threatened the Hepburns with enforcement of the state's anti-literacy laws banning education of Black people.

== Business career ==
In 1866, Hepburn Jr. established the Magnolia House, a three-story brick inn with nineteen rooms located on 300 East Miner Street in the predominantly African American Georgetown district of West Chester. The Magnolia House was the only lodging and tavern in the borough that catered to African Americans, whom de facto racial segregation excluded from similar local establishments. Frederick Douglass, William H. Day, and other Black luminaries lodged at the Magnolia when in town.

In addition to the Magnolia House, Hepburn ran an omnibus service and owned a livery stable, a 56-acre farm, and eleven other properties. He was prominent in the town's African American community as a member of the Bethel African Methodist Episcopal Church, the Liberty Coronet Band, the Knights Templar, and the Free and Accepted Masons. Due to his community engagement, flourishing businesses, and extensive properties, Hepburn became the "wealthiest and best known colored man in Chester county," with a net worth exceeding $29,000 at his death.

== Political career ==
During the 1870s, Republican Party leaders in West Chester sought Black votes but refused to consider Black candidates for elected office. After warnings that the African American community would boycott elections or vote for Democratic candidates, Republicans agreed to a wards system that could enable Black representation for the town's eastward of Georgetown. Hepburn won the 1882 election for the borough council representative by a single vote. He served one two-year term, serving on the council's gas and police committees, and was followed by a succession of four other African American councilors over the ensuing decade.

In 1892, the Republican Party machine, which dominated West Chester politics, switched to an at-large electoral system, diluting the Black vote and eliminating African American representation on the borough council for nearly 75 years. The party committee passed the motion on a 9–7 vote without a quorum.

== Personal life ==
Hepburn died at his West Chester tavern on December 1, 1897, due to a "hemorrhage of the lungs," possibly brought on by an altercation with a white stranger.

His son-in-law, John W. Smothers, took over the business and ran the Magnolia House until 1922.
