= Alexandria City Hall =

Municipal building in Virginia, US

- U.S. National Register of Historic Places
- Virginia Landmarks Register
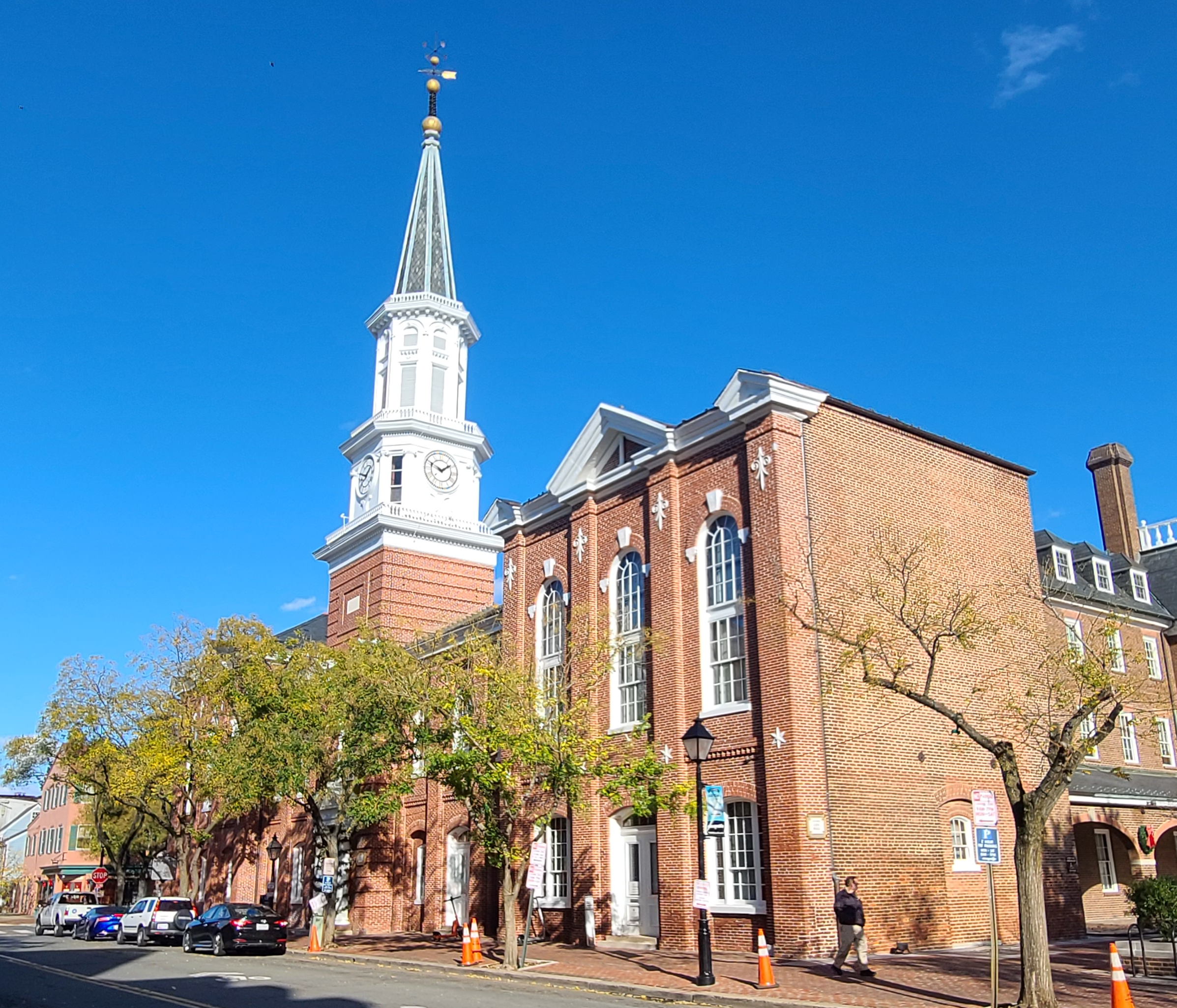
- The west facade facing South Royal Street in 2024

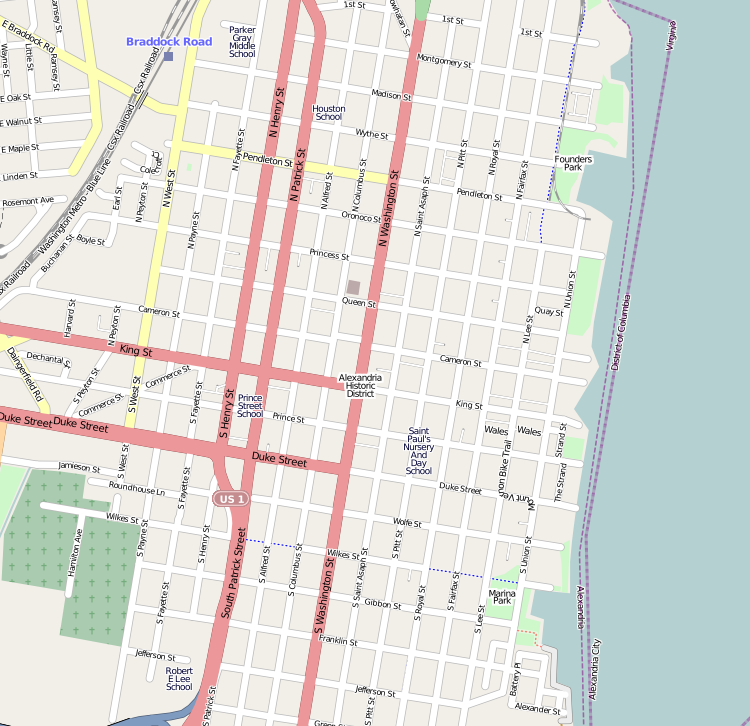
- Location within Alexandria Historical District Location within Alexandria Location within Northern Virginia Location within Virginia Location within the United States
- Location: 301 King St., Alexandria, Virginia, U.S.
- Coordinates: 38°48′18″N 77°2′37″W
- Built: 1871 initial construction
- NRHP reference No.: 84003491
- VLR No.: 100-0126

Significant dates
- Added to NRHP: March 8, 1984
- Designated VLR: November 15, 1983

Alexandria City Hall, also known as the Alexandria Market House & City Hall, in Alexandria, Virginia, is a building designed in 1871 and designed by Adolph Cluss. In 1984, the building was listed on the U.S. National Register of Historic Places.

The site was originally a market from 1749 and a courthouse from 1752. The original city hall was constructed in 1817 and burned down in 1871. The current building opened shortly afterwards, including an exact replica of the clock tower from the 1817 building. A south wing was added in 1961, and demolished in 2026 as part of a renovation that is planned to include the construction of a new south wing.

== History ==
=== Background ===
An 1861 drawing of the 1817 building

The site of Alexandria City Hall dates back to 1749 when a market was established there.

In 1752, lottery proceeds funded the building of a town hall and courthouse on the site, designed by local gentlemen. George Washington served as a justice in this court, which served Alexandria and Fairfax County, to which Alexandria belonged prior to the Revolutionary War.

In 1817, a new three-story brick building was built along Royal Street, including a clock tower designed by Benjamin Henry Latrobe. The building's main facade faced north onto Cameron Street. The tall-steepled tower became a prominent landmark. On May 19, 1871, an extensive fire gutted the building.

=== Current building ===
==== Design and construction ====
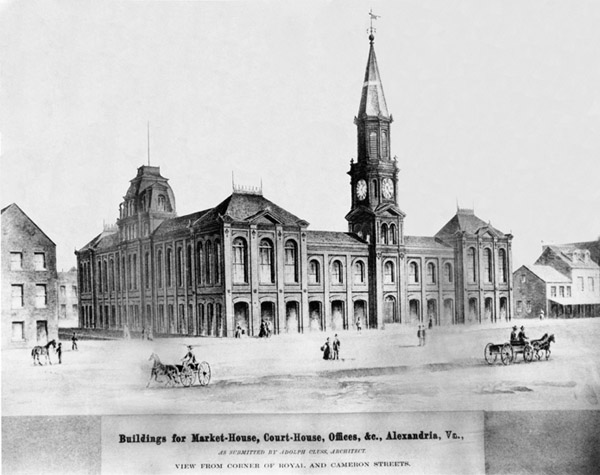
Adolph Cluss' plan for Alexandria City Hall in 1871

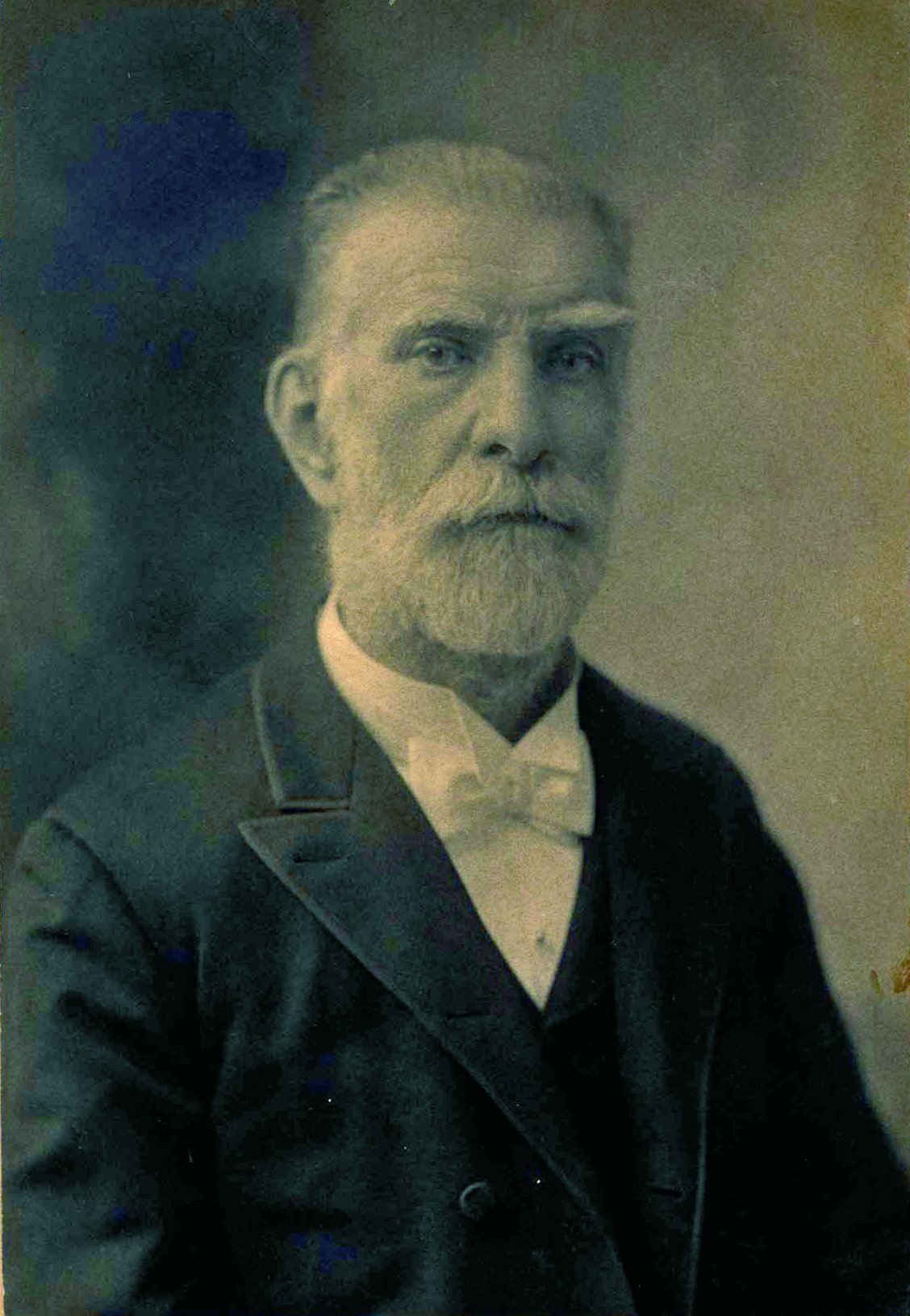
Adolf Cluss

The reconstruction was paid for by the sale of 2,000 shares in the Orange and Alexandria Railroad to the Baltimore and Ohio Railroad for $40,000 and $10,000 insurance from the destroyed building. Townspeople raised enough money to pay for an exact replica of the 1817 clock tower.

Adolf Cluss, an architect, originally from Germany, who had previously designed the U.S. Department of Agriculture building in 1869 and Washington, D.C.'s Central Market in 1870 was swiftly hired within a week, according to the Alexandria Gazette, to draw up plans for the building.

Cluss was especially noted for his technical skill and attention to building safety and strength. Cluss soon presented a plan for the new City Hall to the council, who authorized it formally on June 28, 1871. His design reflected his strong emphasis on safety and the new building would be constructed from brick with cast iron columns, and rolled iron beams and trusses with roofs made of metal or slate, discarding as many wooden or other combustible construction materials as possible. Delahay, an Alexandria-based builder, presented a bid for $45,000, which was received and accepted on October 5, 1871.

The Alexandria-Washington Lodge formally approved Cluss's design on April 2, 1872, and on April 29, 1872, Delahay and Cluss began the construction of the Masonic portion of the building. The new City Hall would be U-shaped around a central courtyard. Another local architect, Benjamin F. Price, provided a plan for replicating the original Latrobe steeple and its estimated cost of $8,000 was paid for by private donors, notably John B. Daingerfield. Price's design for the reconstructed Latrobe tower was approved by the City government on June 12, 1872.

The Alexandria-Washington Masonic Lodge had its headquarters located in the building for some time. The original city hall was something of a complex, containing the Masonic Lodge, court facility, and both the principal police and fire stations of Alexandria. Market stalls were once situated on the first floors of+ the west and north wings and in the courtyard which are absent today.

A wide stairway with rails led from the public entrance on Fairfax Street into the courtrooms.

In the northeast corner on the second floor were two offices for the Clerk, one for clerical use and the other for records storage. The Court Room in the northern section of the building on the second floor was 58 feet (18 m) in length, 9 feet (2.7 m) wide, and 20 feet (6.1 m) high. It had thirteen windows, with six overlooking the market square below and seven located along Cameron Street. The wainscotting was made from yellow pine with walnut rails. Two doors in the western wall led into the judge's retaining room and to a stairway and private quarters of the judge and officers of the court. The main entrance to the Royal Street western wing was beneath the clock tower.

==== Operation ====
In the early 20th century, several alterations were made to the site. The Alexandria Fire Company, once located in the southwest corner, vacated the building and opened the way for the expansion of the police headquarters and prisoner detention cells on the first floor. The Court Records Room was relocated from the second floor to the northeast corner of the first floor and bathrooms were added.

In 1945, the Alexandria-Washington Masonic Lodge moved out of City Hall when the new George Washington Masonic National Memorial was completed on King Street. Interior renovation of the vacated space then commenced and a second Court Room was established on the second floor with additional offices.

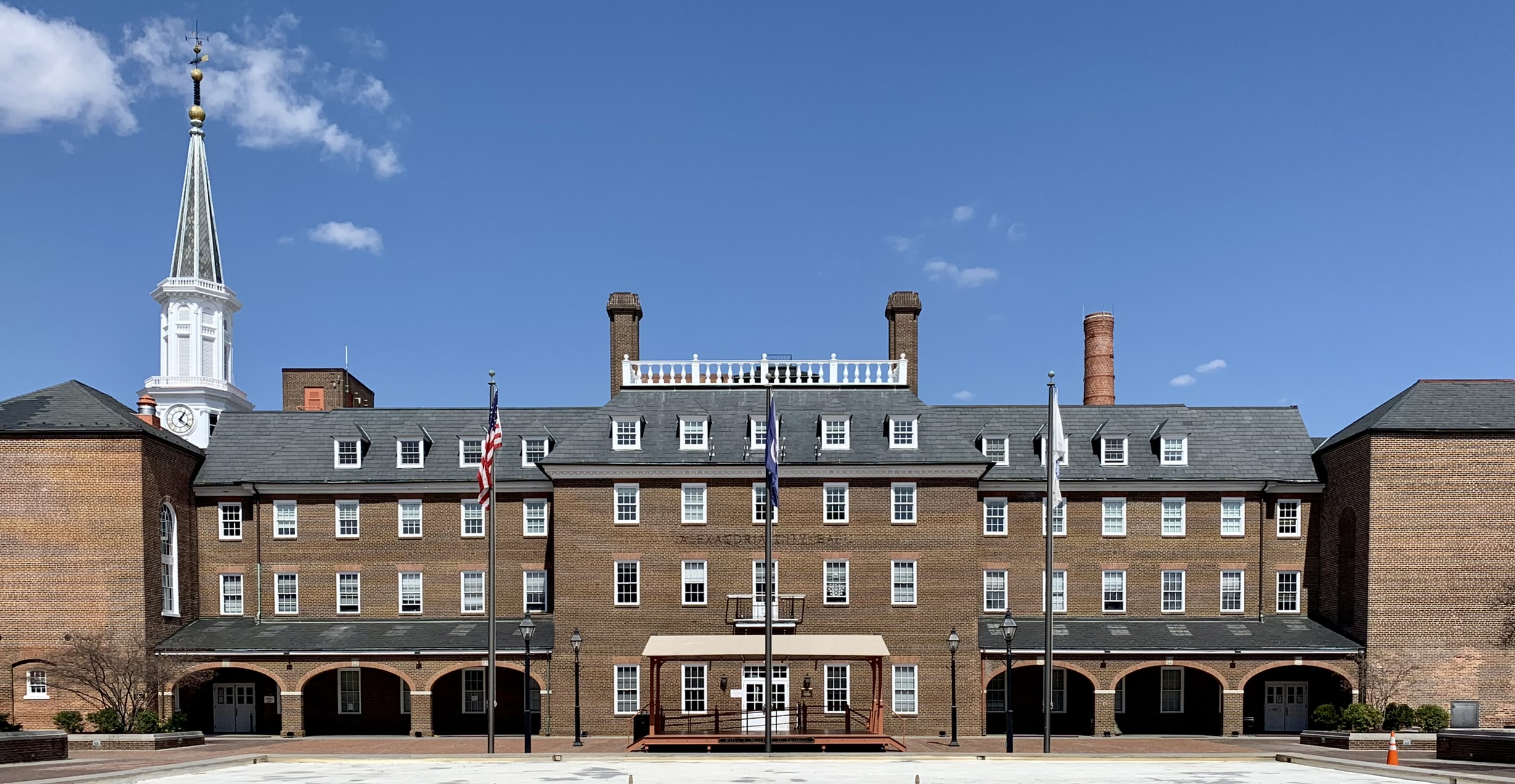
The south facade facing King Street in 2022. This wing of the building was constructed in 1961.

The building after demolition of the south wing and Market Square in 2026

In 1960 and 1961, an addition was built, filling in the old courtyard; it was not until 1981 that this addition was linked to the main building and elevators, stairs and corridors were added. A plaza, completed in 1967, is located towards the southern half of the City Hall block. It is an open, landscaped plaza with a central fountain, built as part of the Gadsby Commercial Urban Renewal Project. The current City Hall building houses many of the Alexandria government offices, including the City Council Chambers on the second floor.

A major renovation of the building began in 2026. That year, the wing built in 1961 was completely demolished.

== Architecture ==
=== Exterior ===
In designing the building, Cluss paid particular attention to the strength and durability of the framework. Alexandria City Hall consists of masonry bearing walls with cast-iron columns, supporting the wood ceiling and floor joists.

It is constructed in the Second Empire style, incorporating three-dimensional massing, mansard roofs, and superimposed orders. The window types and sizes and decor are largely symmetrical.

The majority of the building is laid out in two stories, although there are four three-story corner pavilions and a central four-story pavilion on the north facade. The north facade on Cameron street is approximately 238 feet (73 m) long, with a breadth of 40 feet (12 m). Six bays divide the two-story sections and there were two entry doors to the Masonic Lodge. The top floors of the three-story pavilions have semi-circular windows and have hip roofs, two of which are gabled. The central pavilion is crowned by a grouping of three mansard roofs, whilst the two-story sections of the building have gabled roofs, sheathed in slate with galvanized iron cornices. The central pavilion originally had slate with wood cornices and a tin capping but following restoration work in the 1960s these were resheathed and the wood and tin was replaced with iron and copper respectively.

The central clock tower, unlike the rest of the roofing, is still in the original diamond pattern slate, crowned by a gold leaf finial and weather vane. It is a replica of the original 1817 market steeple and is constructed in the Georgian architectural style. The tower has a square rusticated brick base and is structured in three tiers, with the main entry door on the west facade. An inscription on the tower indicates that it was destroyed by a fire on May 19, 1871, and rebuilt in 1872. The tower is supported by two cast-iron columns with Corinthian capitals; above the clock is a smaller octagonal tier with eight narrow windows, enclosed by a wooden balustrade. The tower is crowned by a spire and a gilded weather vane. The west facade of Alexandria City Hall is approximately 148 feet (45 m) long and consists of two-story section split with two three-story pavilions which are divided into three bays by four three-story brick piers.

The east facade of the hall is located on North Fairfax Street and is the same length as the west at 148 feet (45 m); it is 40 feet (12 m) deep. It has a two-story section, divided into nine bays by brick pilasters, and is terminated on both ends by three-story pavilions which are three bays wide and have three-story corner piers. Some of the pilasters originally contained stove flues and were topped by brick chimneys, but these no longer exist. There is a door at the southern end of the facade which was once the main entrance of old police station. The door at the northern end led into the former Court House.

In 1967, the Gadsby Commercial Urban Renewal Project brought about the reorientation of the City Hall towards the southern facade with the new entrance facing King Street and Market Square. It is characterized by an open, landscaped plaza with a central fountain.

== Interior ==
Little remains of the original interior from 1871 except some masonry bearing walls and cast iron columns. The hall was extensively renovated several times in the twentieth century. However, traces of old plaster, paint, and wallpaper are visible in some parts of the building. In the second floor chamber of the northeast pavilion, the wooden framework is also visible from the cove ceiling. When the structure was extended in 1961 it was necessary to remove some of the original cast iron columns, leaving only ten columns in the central pavilion. When a new Court House opened on King Street in 1981, the court rooms, judicial chambers, prisoner holding cells, clerk's office, jury rooms, witness room, and ancillary facilities were moved out of City Hall. Today the building functions exclusively as a City Hall.

== See also ==
- National Register of Historic Places listings in Alexandria, Virginia
