= George Lewis Seaton House =

Historic house in Virginia, United States

- U.S. National Register of Historic Places
- Virginia Landmarks Register
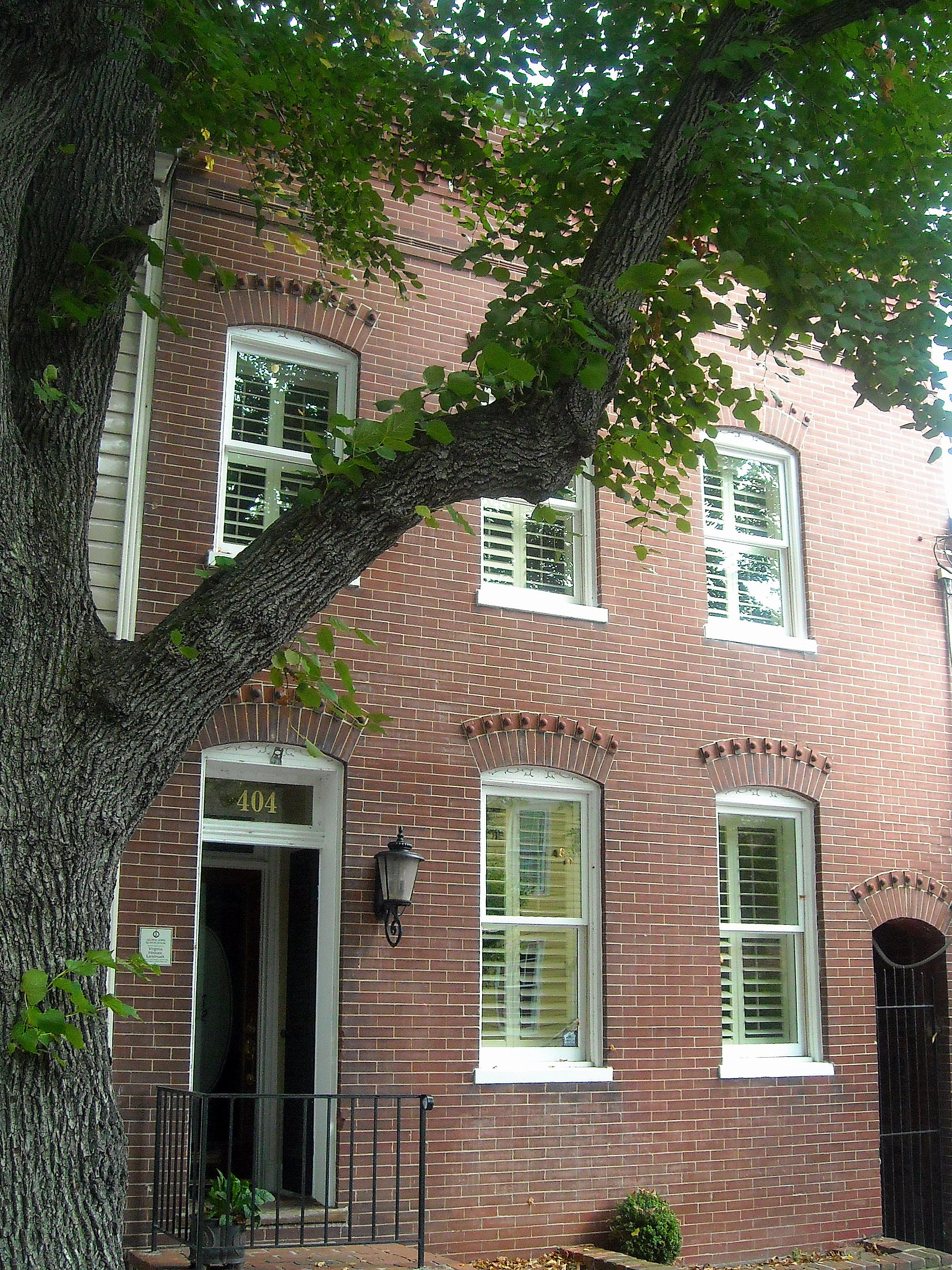
- George Lewis Seaton House

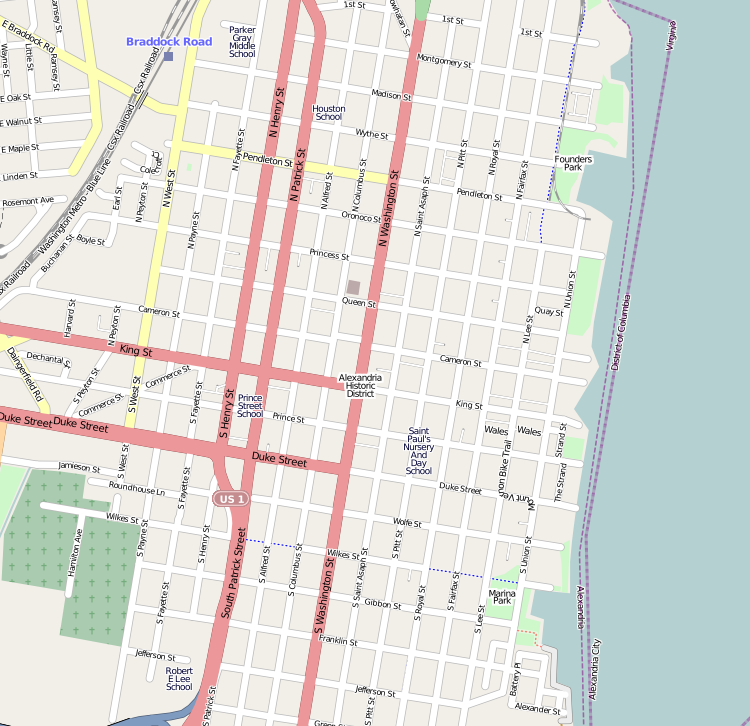
- Location within Alexandria Historical District Location within Virginia Location within the United States
- Location: 404 S. Royal St., Alexandria, Virginia
- Coordinates: 38°48′10″N 77°2′39″W
- Area: less than one acre
- Architectural style: Late Victorian
- MPS: African American Historic Resources of Alexandria, Virginia MPS
- NRHP reference No.: 03001425
- VLR No.: 100-5015-0007

Significant dates
- Added to NRHP: January 16, 2004
- Designated VLR: September 10, 2003

The George Lewis Seaton House, located at 404 South Royal Street in Alexandria, Virginia and listed in the National Register of Historic Places, is the former home of George Lewis Seaton, a nineteenth-century African-American civic and political leader.

== History ==
George Lewis Seaton was the first African-American legislator from Alexandria elected to the Virginia General Assembly. He was a wealthy man who tried to forge peace and understanding between the whites and blacks of his area. Seaton built several important buildings in Alexandria, including Odd Fellows Hall, the Seaton School for Boys, and the Hallowell School for Girls. He also helped found the Free School Society of Alexandria, the Colored YMCA, and the Colored Building Association. The two-story, three-bay, side hall plan brick townhouse that stands on the property today was built by Seaton's family after he died in 1881. They lived there into the 20th century, doing several renovations.
