= Moses Hepburn Rowhouses =

Historic house in Virginia, United States

- U.S. National Register of Historic Places
- Virginia Landmarks Register
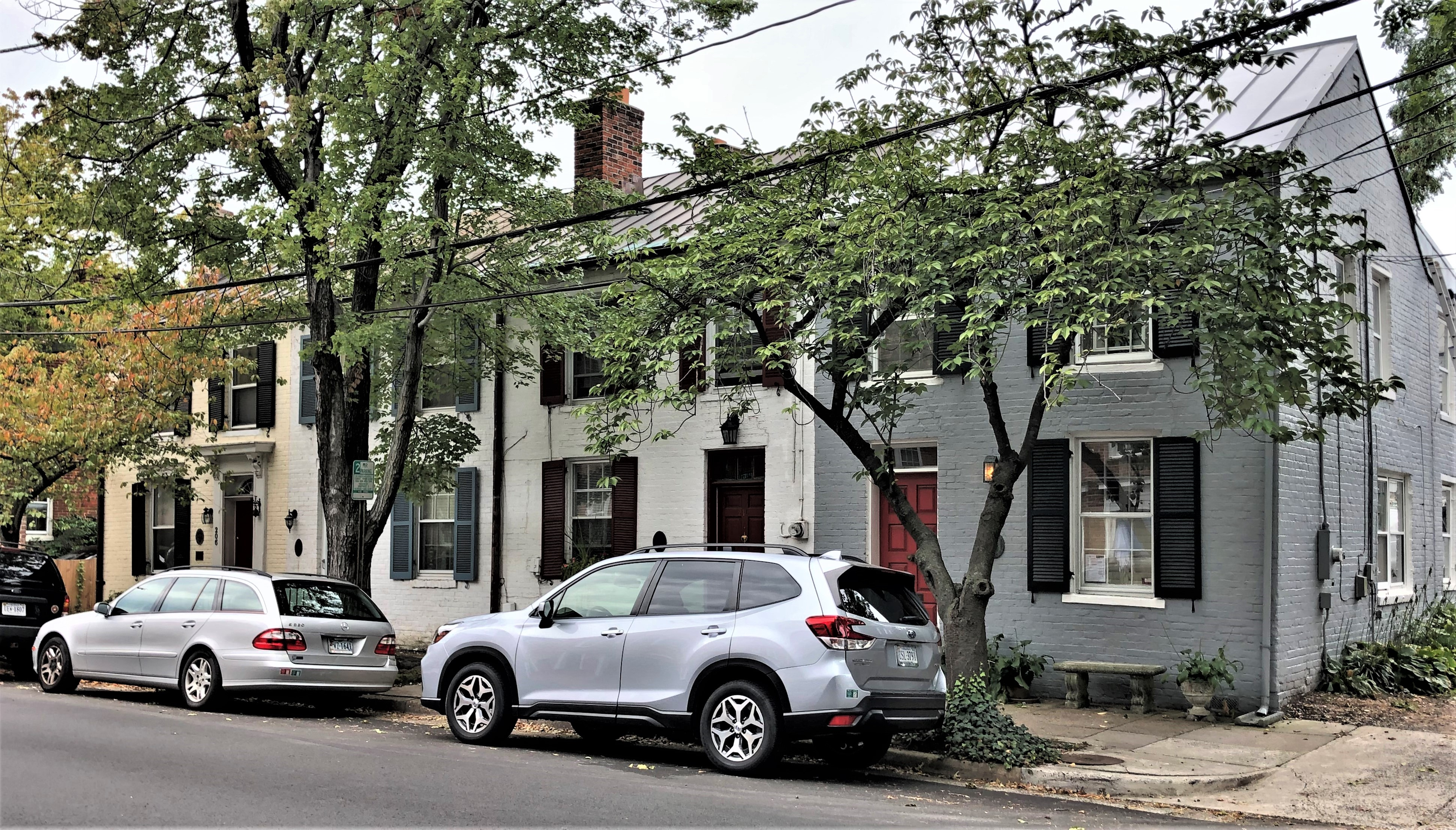
- (2021)

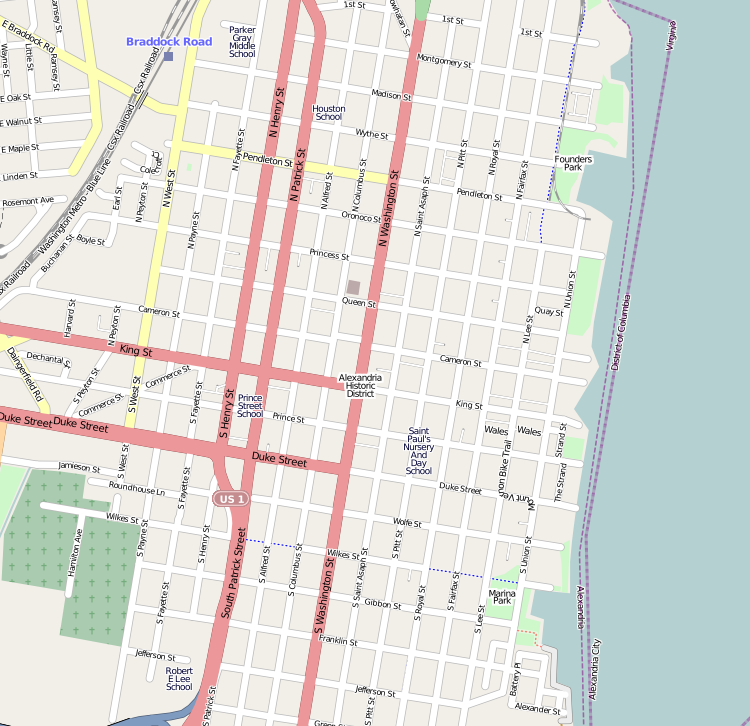
- Location within Alexandria Historical District Location within Virginia Location within the United States
- Location: 206–212 N. Pitt St., Alexandria, Virginia
- Coordinates: 38°48′30″N 77°2′41″W
- Area: less than one acre
- Architectural style: Mid 19th Century Revival
- MPS: African American Historic Resources of Alexandria, Virginia MPS
- NRHP reference No.: 03001426
- VLR No.: 100-5015-0004

Significant dates
- Added to NRHP: January 16, 2004
- Designated VLR: September 10, 2003

The Moses Hepburn Rowhouses are a set of four historic rowhouses located at 206 through 212 North Pitt Street between Cameron Street and Hammond Court in the Old Town area of Alexandria, Virginia. They were built about 1850 by Moses Hepburn Sr., a prominent African American businessman and citizen whose son became the first African American town councilor of West Chester, Pennsylvania, in 1882. The houses are two-story, two-bay, side hall plan dwellings. Originally identical, the unit at No. 206 was updated in the late nineteenth century. Each house has had one-story or two-story additions in the rear.

The houses were added to the National Register of Historic Places in 2004.
