= Athenaeum (Alexandria, Virginia) =

Historic commercial building in Virginia, United States

- Old Dominion Bank Building
- U.S. National Register of Historic Places
- Virginia Landmarks Register
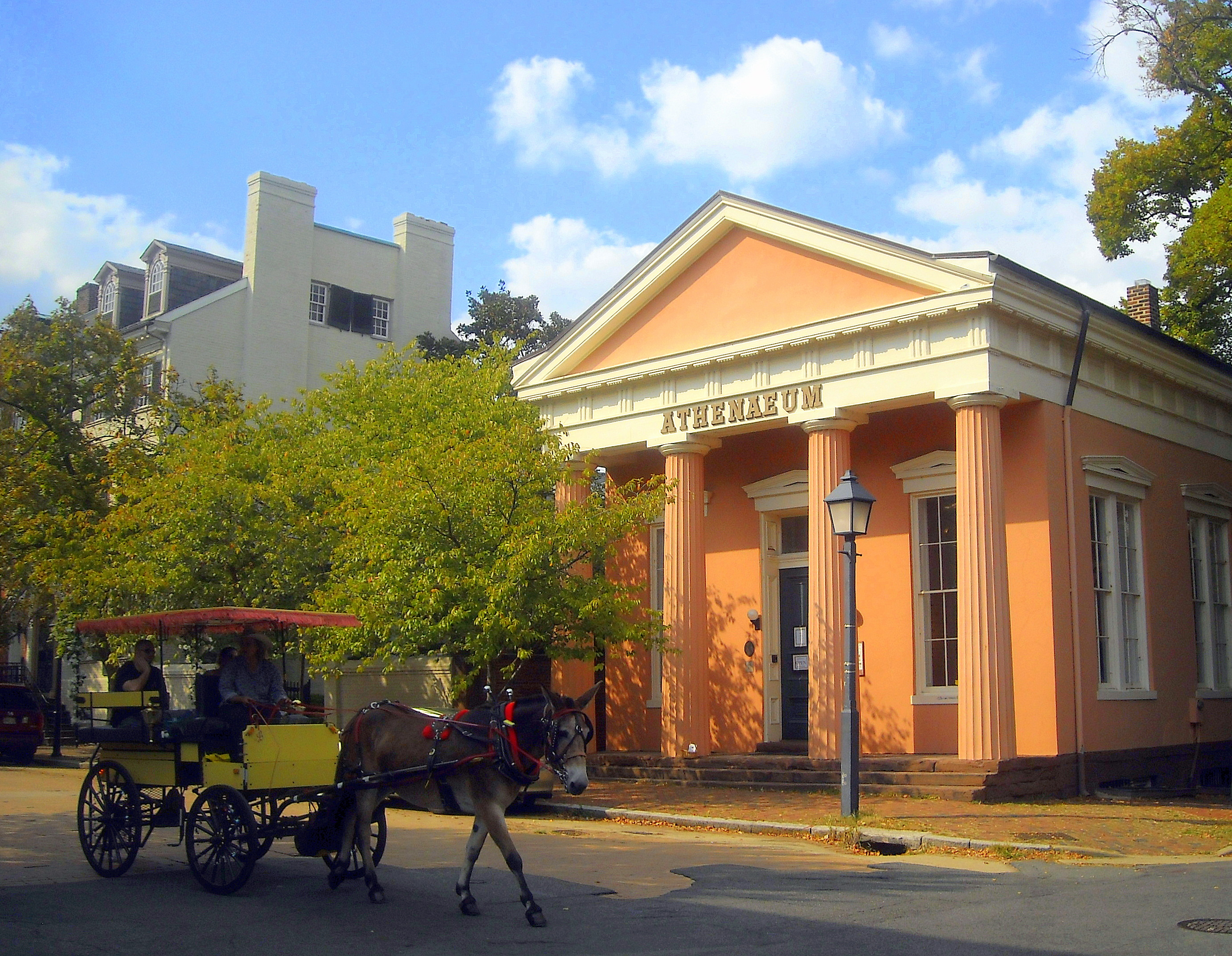
- Old Dominion Bank Building

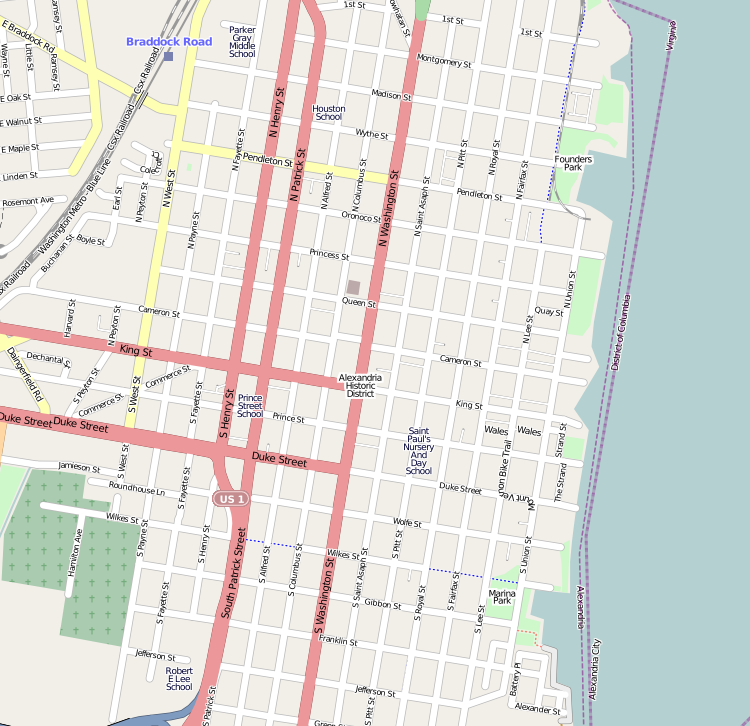
- Location within Alexandria Historical District Location within Virginia Location within the United States
- Location: 201 Prince St., Alexandria, Virginia
- Coordinates: 38°48′19″N 77°2′31″W
- Area: less than one acre
- Built: 1851
- Architect: Francis, E.; Jenkins, B.H.
- Architectural style: Greek Revival
- NRHP reference No.: 80004307
- VLR No.: 100-0002

Significant dates
- Added to NRHP: March 20, 1980
- Designated VLR: November 20, 1979

The Athenaeum is a gallery of fine arts and a performance venue in Alexandria, Virginia, United States. It is also home to the Northern Virginia Fine Arts Association since 1964. The building is an important example of Greek Revival architecture. The Athenaeum has a long history and has served several purposes during its lifetime. The building is now part of the Virginia Trust and was listed on the National Register of Historic Places in 1980.

== History ==
The land on which the edifice hosting the museum was built belonged to William Fairfax; it was surveyed by George Washington. The building was constructed between 1851 and 1852 at the intersection of Lee and Prince streets to serve as the office of the Bank of the Old Dominion, where it is reported that Robert E. Lee had an account. The bank was at the head of the Captains' Row, a block of 18th-century buildings that still face the cobblestone street.

The Bank of the Old Dominion operated at the site until the Civil War, when Alexandria was occupied by the Union forces and the building became the abode of the U.S. Commissary Quartermaster. The Bank of the Old Dominion closed its doors in 1862, but the building again hosted a bank, this time the First Virginia Bank, in the years from 1870 to 1907. In 1907 the building started to be used by the pharmaceutical wholesalers Leadbeater and Sons, one of the oldest Alexandria firms. In 1925 the property passed to the Free Methodist Church of North America, which used it until 1964, when the Northern Virginia Fine Arts Association (NVFAA) purchased the building. The NVFAA still owns the property, which is used for several purposes, mainly for fine arts exhibitions. It was formerly a satellite office to the Washington School of Ballet.

The Athenaeum is part of the Virginia Trust and is listed on the National Register of Historic Places. The building, also known as the Old Dominion Bank Building, is one of the few privately owned buildings in Alexandria open to the public and thus depends largely on community donations for its survival.
