= Fowle-Reed-Wyman House =

Historic house in Massachusetts, United States

- U.S. National Register of Historic Places
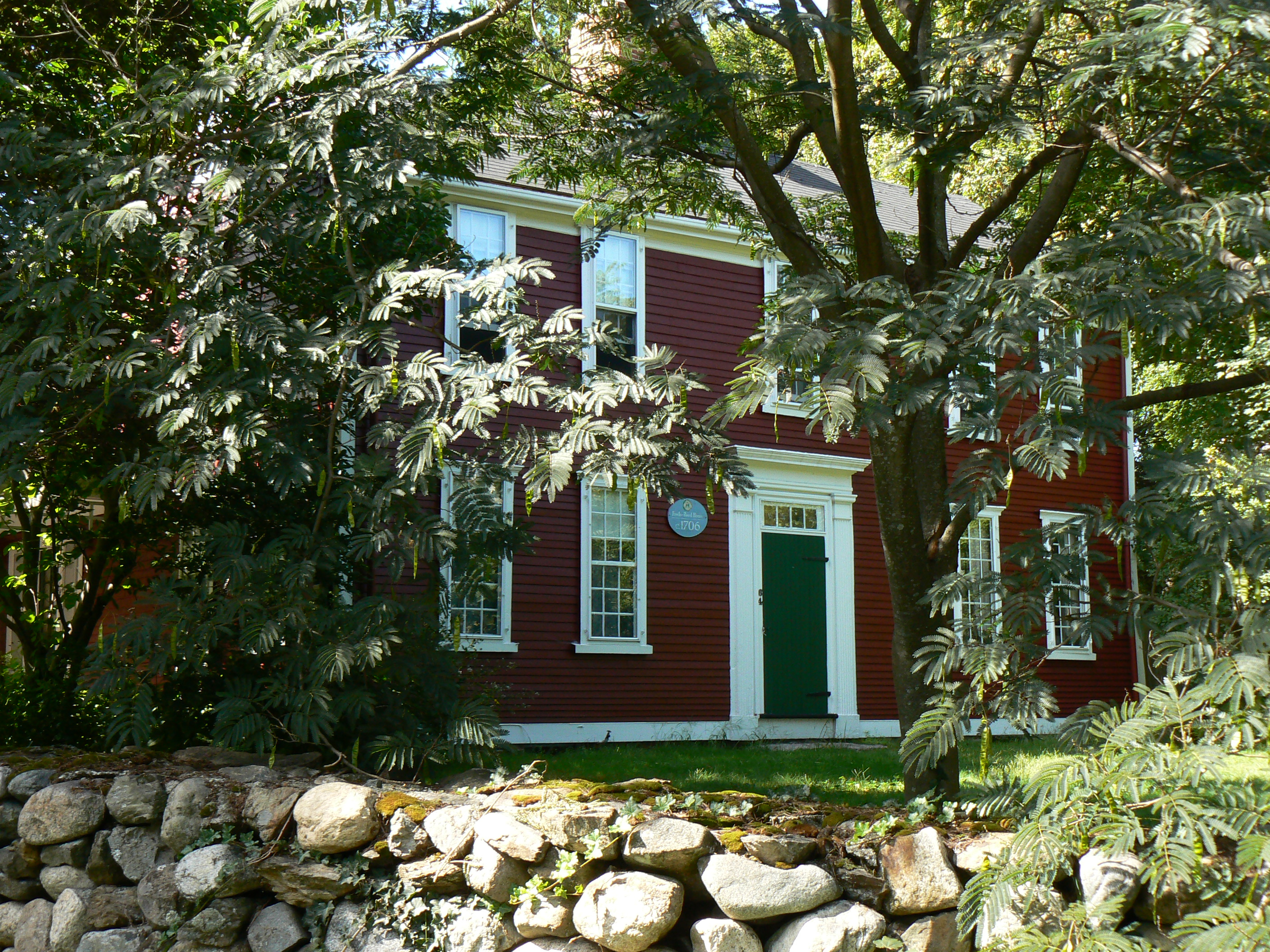
- Photo of the house, 2008

- Location within Massachusetts Location within the United States
- Location: 64 Old Mystic Street, Arlington, Massachusetts
- Coordinates: 42°25′54″N 71°9′25″W
- Built: 1706
- Architectural style: Saltbox
- NRHP reference No.: 75000244
- Added to NRHP: April 14, 1975

The Fowle-Reed-Wyman House is a historic First Period house in Arlington, Massachusetts. The house is a two-story wood-frame saltbox structure with integral lean-to, central chimney, and clapboard siding. Built about 1706, it is the oldest structure in Arlington, and is the best-preserved of the three First Period houses left in the town. A c. 1915 addition, sympathetic in style, extends to the rear. The house was built by John Fowle, who had inherited the land from his mother, and was sold the following year to Daniel Reed. From 1775 to 1924 the house was owned by members of the Wyman family.

The house was listed on the National Register of Historic Places in 1975.

== See also ==
- National Register of Historic Places listings in Arlington, Massachusetts
