= Bayne–Fowle House =

Historic house in Virginia, US

- U.S. National Register of Historic Places
- Virginia Landmarks Register
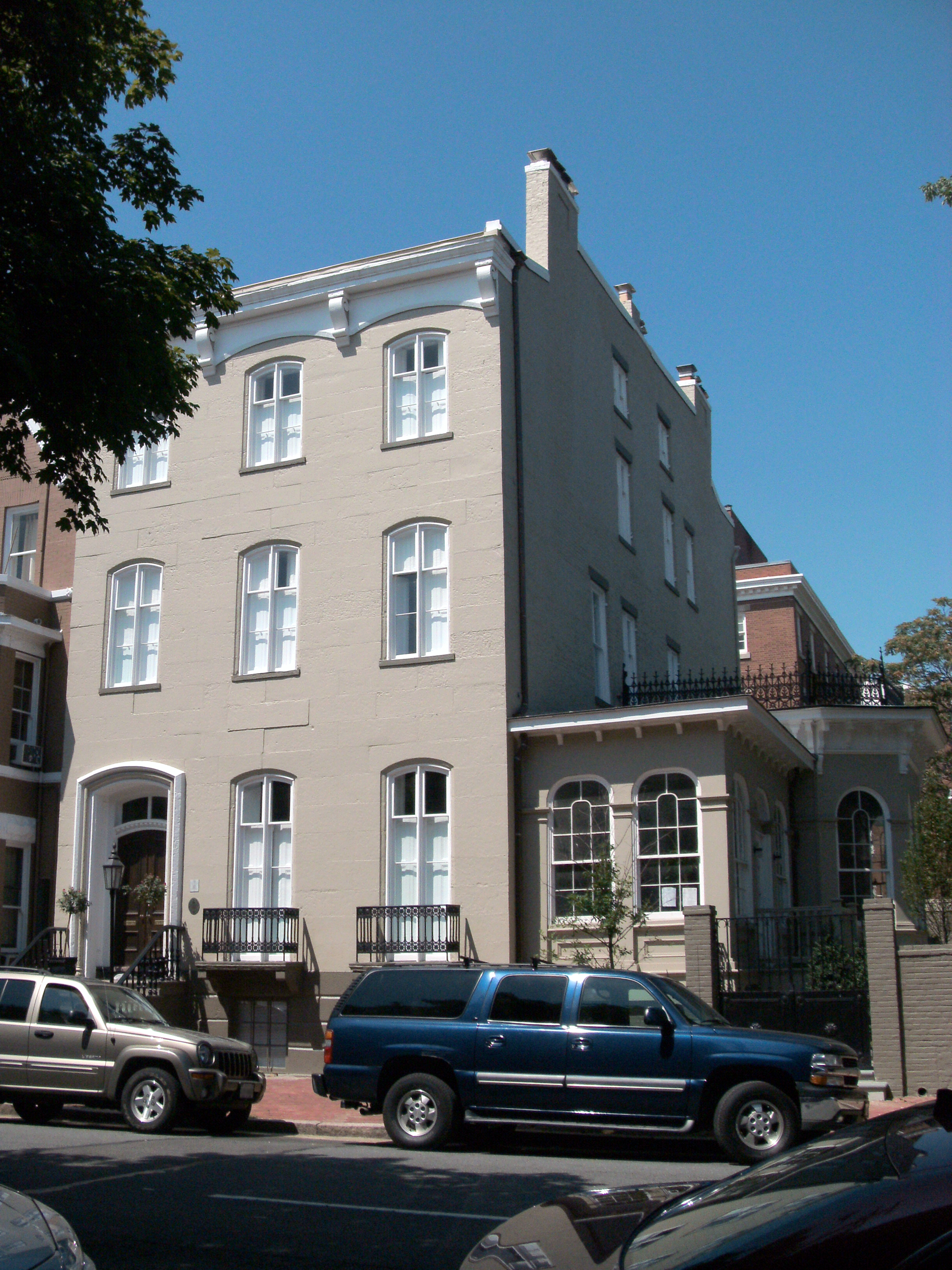
- Bayne–Fowle House

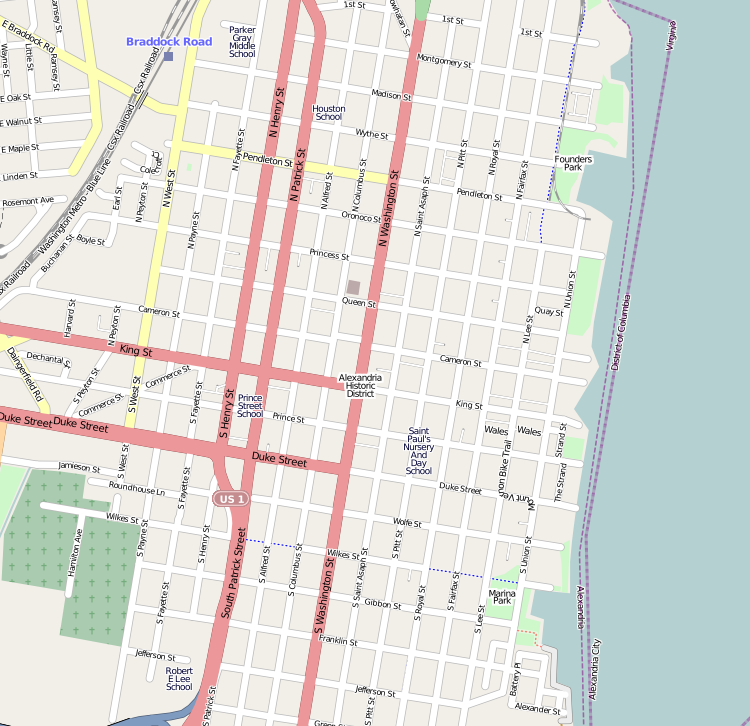
- Location within Alexandria Historical District Location within Virginia Location within the United States
- Location: 811 Prince Street, Alexandria, Virginia
- Coordinates: 38°48′15″N 77°2′58″W
- Built: 1854
- NRHP reference No.: 86003136
- VLR No.: 100-0006

Significant dates
- Added to NRHP: November 6, 1986
- Designated VLR: June 17, 1986

The Bayne–Fowle House is a historic house located at 811 Prince Street in Alexandria, Virginia, United States. It was added to the National Register of Historic Places on November 6, 1986. The Bayne–Fowle House is a masonry townhouse built in 1854 for William Bayne, an Alexandria-based commission merchant. It is noted for its fine mid-Victorian interiors and elaborate plasterwork. During the American Civil War the house was occupied by Northern troops and subsequently confiscated by the Federal government and converted briefly into a military hospital. Since 1871 it has been a private residence.

== Background and history ==
William Bayne, a commission merchant and grocer in Alexandria, purchased the lot at 811 Prince Street in 1849. A house was constructed in 1854 but was sold to William H. Fowle, another commission merchant and the son of a Massachusetts businessman in 1855. The house served as his residence until the outbreak of the American Civil War, when he took refuge in Richmond. During the Civil War the house was occupied by Northern troops and occupied by the federal government. In 1864 the building was used as a military hospital. After the civil war Fowle won a lawsuit to recover his property but he died in 1869, prior to the victory and subsequently the property was sold to John Jordan Wheat in 1871. Since 1871 the house has been used as a private residence, although several owners have been physicians such as Dr. Samuel B. Moore, who purchased the house in 1906, and maintained his office in the building until the 1940s. Today the property is owned by Richard Klingler and Jane Slatter and was recently given a major renovation.

== Architecture ==
=== Exterior ===
The Bayne–Fowle House is a three-story masonry town house in the Italianate design, located in a finely preserved block of the Old Town of Alexandria. It is surrounded by houses which date to the late 18th century. The house is made of brick with a painted ashlar sandstone facade, with elongated windows, a low-pitched gable roof, and an ornamental cornice. A side conservatory and small garden are found on the eastern side (the right hand side, as seen from the street). Separating the double parlors is a pendant arcade adorned with cast-iron bosses.

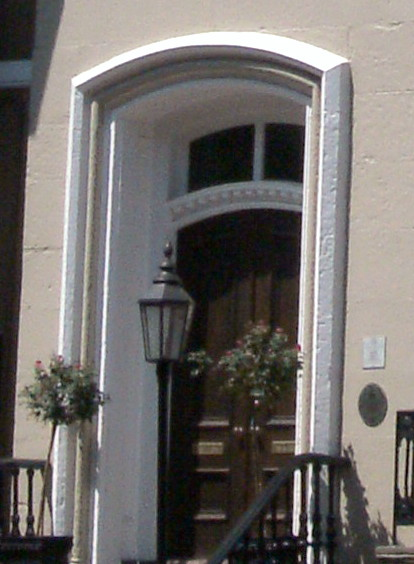
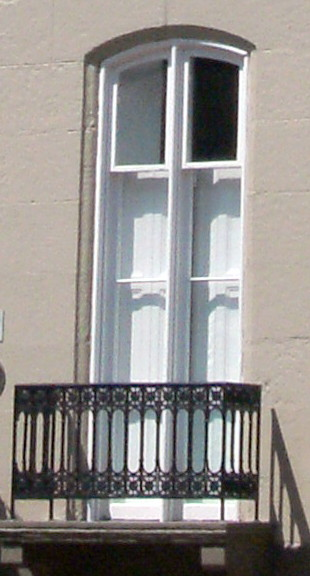
Left:The front door on the west side. Right:The elongated style windows.

The facade consists of three regular bays, with the primary entrance located on the western bay, reached by seven sandstone steps with matching cast-iron balustrades and newels. To the right of the entrance on the first floor are two floor-length windows with stone balconies and iron railings. The current exterior wooden window shutters were only added around 1975. The second and third floors of the facade each have three symmetrical windows with segmental arched lintels with a projecting cornice crowning the facade, supported by console brackets. The north elevation of the house to the rear is three bays wide, and features a small two-story masonry and frame addition on its west side. There is a frame connection to the brick garage building, erected in 1922. A brick wall was built around 1965, to border the garden to the east of the house. The side garden contains Japanese maple trees and a row of European hornbeam trees. Evergreens line the lawn.

== Interior ==
The interior is furnished with luxurious materials such as marble and gilded mirrors. The primary entrance to the house leads to a small vestibule with a second set of paired doors, opening into the first-floor stair hall. The hall has original random width heart pine floor boards and plaster walls and ceiling and wooden baseboards and is adorned by plaster cornice ornaments the hall. An open-stringer staircase with elliptical handrails is located in the hallway, leading to the second floor; a passageway concealed behind it (as one enters the house) leads to the basement. At the rear of the hall is a small bathroom and an elevator, installed around 1965.

Three sets of paired doors lead from the hall into the twin parlors and the dining room. The parlors are square in shape, and are separated by a suspended overhead pendant arcade. Eastlake-type iron gasoliers with two tiers of globes are suspended from the ceiling; these date from 1867 but have since been electrified. The floors are pine; the walls are plastered. The pendant arcade consists of two semi-circular arches and a central semi-elliptical arch, supported with cast-iron console brackets and pendant bosses. The original silver-plate doorknobs of the parlors were replaced in around 1960 with brass hardware. Pocket doors lead from the northern parlor to the dining room at the north end of the building. The mantelpiece in the dining room is made from marbleized slate and has an original pier mirror, located between the two windows on the dining room's north wall. Paired doors with glass panels lead to the polygonal room in the eastern wing which was once used as a library. The conservatory features original scalloped wooden shelves below the arched windows. The kitchen contains modern appliances.

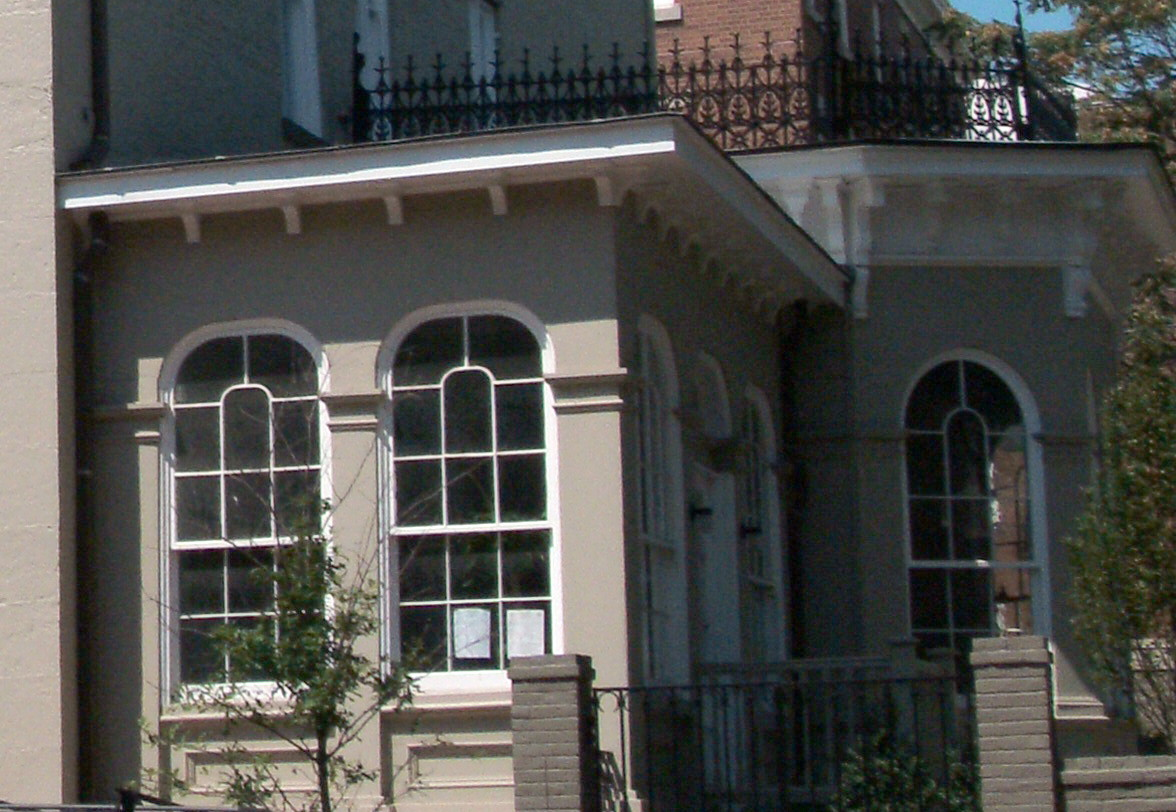
The east wing extension containing the conservatory and kitchen

The second floor of the Bayne–Fowle House has a similar layout to that of the first, with three bedrooms and a bathroom to the south end of the hall and a laundry and bathroom at the north end. All bedrooms have wood flooring, plaster walls and plaster ceilings and fireplaces, two of which have marble mantelpieces with the third being metal and stone.

The third floor contains three bedrooms, on the same plan as the second floor; all have diminutive marble mantelpieces. A small room at the north end of the hall serves as a kitchenette with the bathroom at the south end of the hallway. The attic is largely finished. A small unfinished room in the attic has penciled graffiti on the plastered wall believed to date back to the Civil War period. The basement, which is also largely finished space has feature bare brick walls. It also contains a bathroom and storage areas.

== See also ==
- National Register of Historic Places listings in Alexandria, Virginia
