= Land Trust of Virginia =

- Formation: 1991
- Headquarters: Commonwealth of Virginia
- Website: https://landtrustva.org/

The Land Trust of Virginia (LTV) was originally formed in 1991 as the first statewide nonprofit land trust in the Commonwealth of Virginia. LTV uses a legal tool called a conservation easement to help landowners voluntarily protect scenic, historic, or environmentally sensitive lands while keeping the land in private ownership and open for compatible uses, including forestry, farming, recreation, and limited residential uses.

The Land Trust of Virginia is headquartered near Middleburg, Virginia and has protected more than 151 properties and 18,000 acres throughout the state.

== History ==
The Land Trust of Virginia was established in 1992. The accredited land trust partners with landowners who volunteer to place their properties under a permanent conservation easement.

The greatest density of easements are in Loudoun and Fauquier Counties, but LTV also holds easements in Clarke, Rappahannock, Culpeper, Madison, Hanover, Green, and Albemarle Counties. In 2009, the Land Trust of Virginia was accredited by the Land Trust Accreditation Commission, an independent program of the national Land Trust Alliance. The Land Trust of Virginia is one of the first 54 land trusts in the nation – and the second in Virginia - to receive such a designation.

In 2022, the Land Trust of Virginia acquired an easement in Albemarle County for a factory farm in the Totier Creek drinking water protection area, which supplies the town of Scottsville. Despite concerns about pollution emanating from the factory farm, the Land Trust Alliance granted LTV reaccreditation in 2025.

In 2025, the Land Trust of Virginia announced permanent protection of 51-acres of donated land in Fauquier County.
