= Alexandria National Cemetery (Virginia) =

Civil War era war cemetery in Virginia

- U.S. National Register of Historic Places
- Virginia Landmarks Register
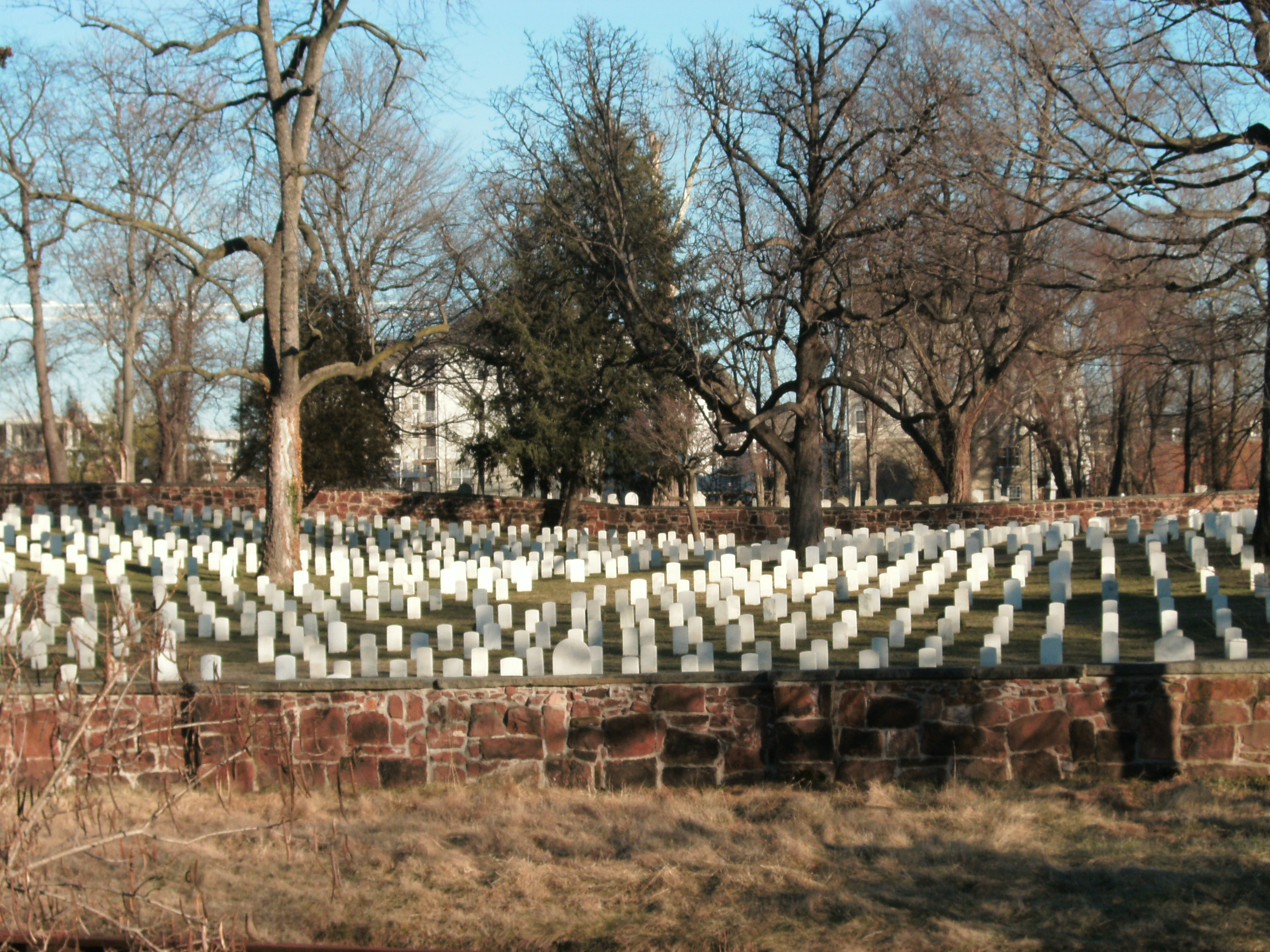
- Alexandria National Cemetery; in the background, behind the second stone wall, may be seen some of the older burials

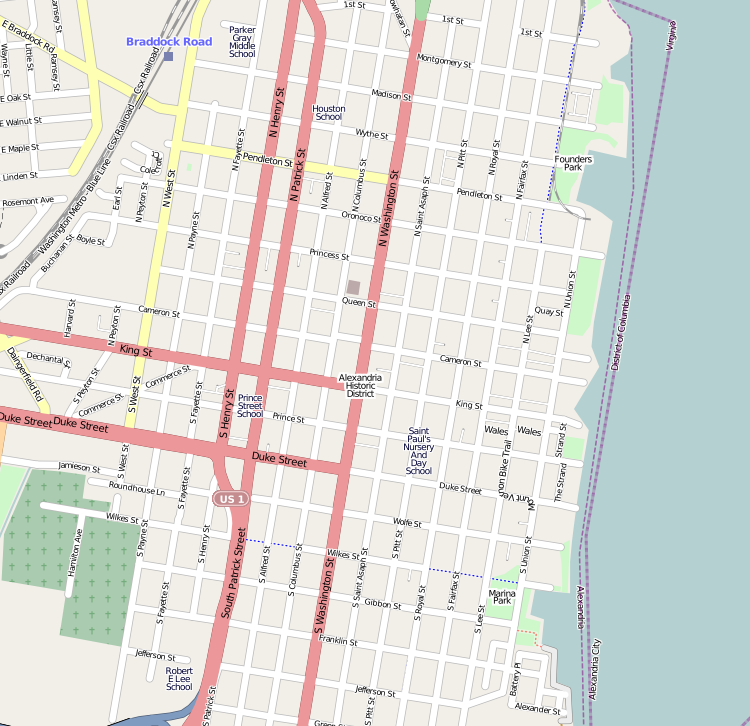
- Location within Alexandria Historical District Location within Virginia Location within the United States
- Location: 1450 Wilkes St., Alexandria, Virginia
- Coordinates: 38°48′07″N 77°03′29″W
- Area: 5.5 acres (2.2 ha)
- Built: 1862
- Architect: Meigs, Montgomery C.
- Architectural style: Italianate, Second Empire
- MPS: Civil War Era National Cemeteries MPS
- NRHP reference No.: 95000106
- VLR No.: 100-0138

Significant dates
- Added to NRHP: March 2, 1995
- Designated VLR: October 19, 1994

VA interpretive sign about Alexandria National Cemetery

Alexandria National Cemetery is a United States National Cemetery, of approximately 5.5 acres (2.2 ha), located in the city of Alexandria, Virginia. Administered by the United States Department of Veterans Affairs, it is one of the original national cemeteries that were established in 1862. As of 2014, it was site to over 4,500 interments. The cemetery can accommodate the cremated remains of eligible individuals.

== History ==
As one of the original national cemeteries, it served as the burial grounds for mostly Union soldiers who died in the numerous hospitals around the Alexandria area, but by 1864 it was almost filled to capacity. This led to the development of the Arlington National Cemetery. The remains of 39 Confederates, originally buried in the cemetery during the Civil War, were disinterred by the Daughters of the Confederacy in 1879. The remains were reinterred in Christ Church cemetery.

Alexandria National Cemetery was listed in the National Register of Historic Places in 1995.

== Notable interments ==
Following the assassination of President Abraham Lincoln in April 1865, four civilian members of the Alexandria Fire Department were among twenty men hired by the Union Army's Quartermaster Corp to man the Black Diamond canal barge on the Potomac River. As part of the manhunt for John Wilkes Booth, the Black Diamond was to patrol the river stopping any vessels that could be attempting to transport Booth across the Potomac into Virginia.

As the Black Diamond was anchored around midnight, April 23, 1865 it was struck by the USS Massachusetts. The four civilian firefighters, Peter Carroll, Christopher Farley, Samuel Gosnell, and George Huntington, died as a result of the collision. As they were in service to their country, they were bestowed the honor of being buried alongside Union soldiers in Alexandria National Cemetery.
