= George Lewis Seaton =

George Lewis Seaton (c. 1822–1881) was an African American carpenter, real estate holder, and school benefactor. Seaton built two schools for African American students in Alexandria, Virginia on behalf of the Freemen's Bureau and was a trustee of the First Free School Society. Seaton served in the Virginia House of Delegates during the 1869-1871 session.

== Life and career ==
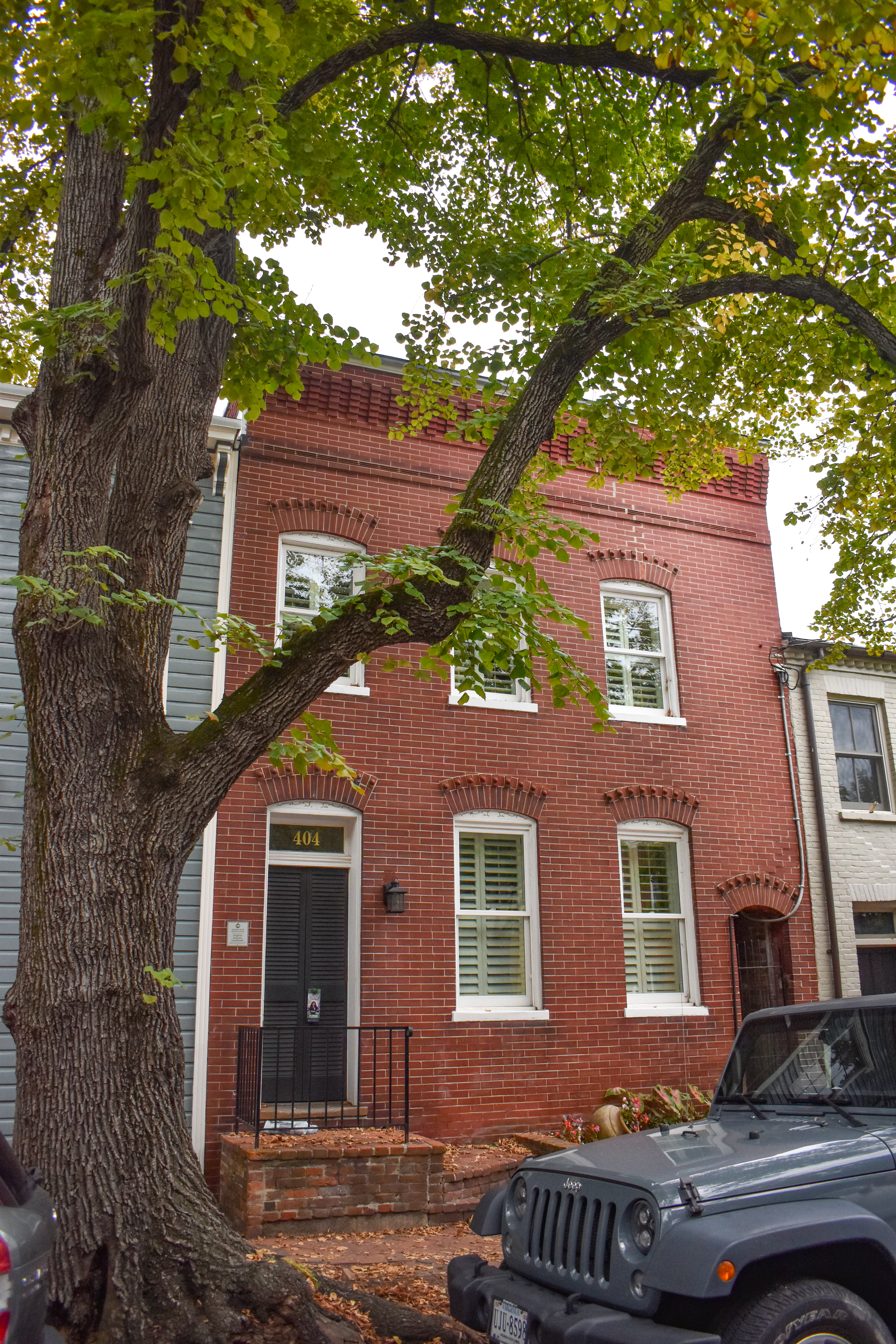
George Lewis Seaton House, Alexandria, VA

Seaton was born free to George, a free Black man, and Lucinda Seaton. His mother had been enslaved at Mount Vernon before her emancipation.

In 1844, Seaton began to build his real estate portfolio by purchasing a lot in Alexandria. He inherited another lot from his father and continued to buy and sell land in Alexandria.

Seaton married Maria Louisa Bryant, a free woman of color, around October 6, 1845. The couple had four daughters and five sons.

Seaton worked as a carpenter. In 1866, he was contracted by Bureau of Refugees, Freedmen and Abandoned Lands to build a school in Alexandria. The school opened in 1867 and served both white and free Black boys. In 1870, the school was incorporated into the Alexandria school system and was open to only African American boys. The school's official name was the Snowden School for Boys, but was also known in the community as the Seaton School. Around the same time, Seaton built the Hallowell School for Girls, a school for African American girls. Seaton was a trustee of the Free School Society of Alexandria. The organization raised $1,600 to purchase of the lots where the schools were built.

Seaton was elected to the Virginia House of Delegates in 1869. He served for one term.

== Legacy ==
The Seaton family lived at 404 South Royal Street in Alexandria, Virginia. The George Lewis Seaton House is on the National Register of Historic Places.
