= Carlyle House =

Historic house in Virginia, United States

- U.S. National Register of Historic Places
- Virginia Landmarks Register
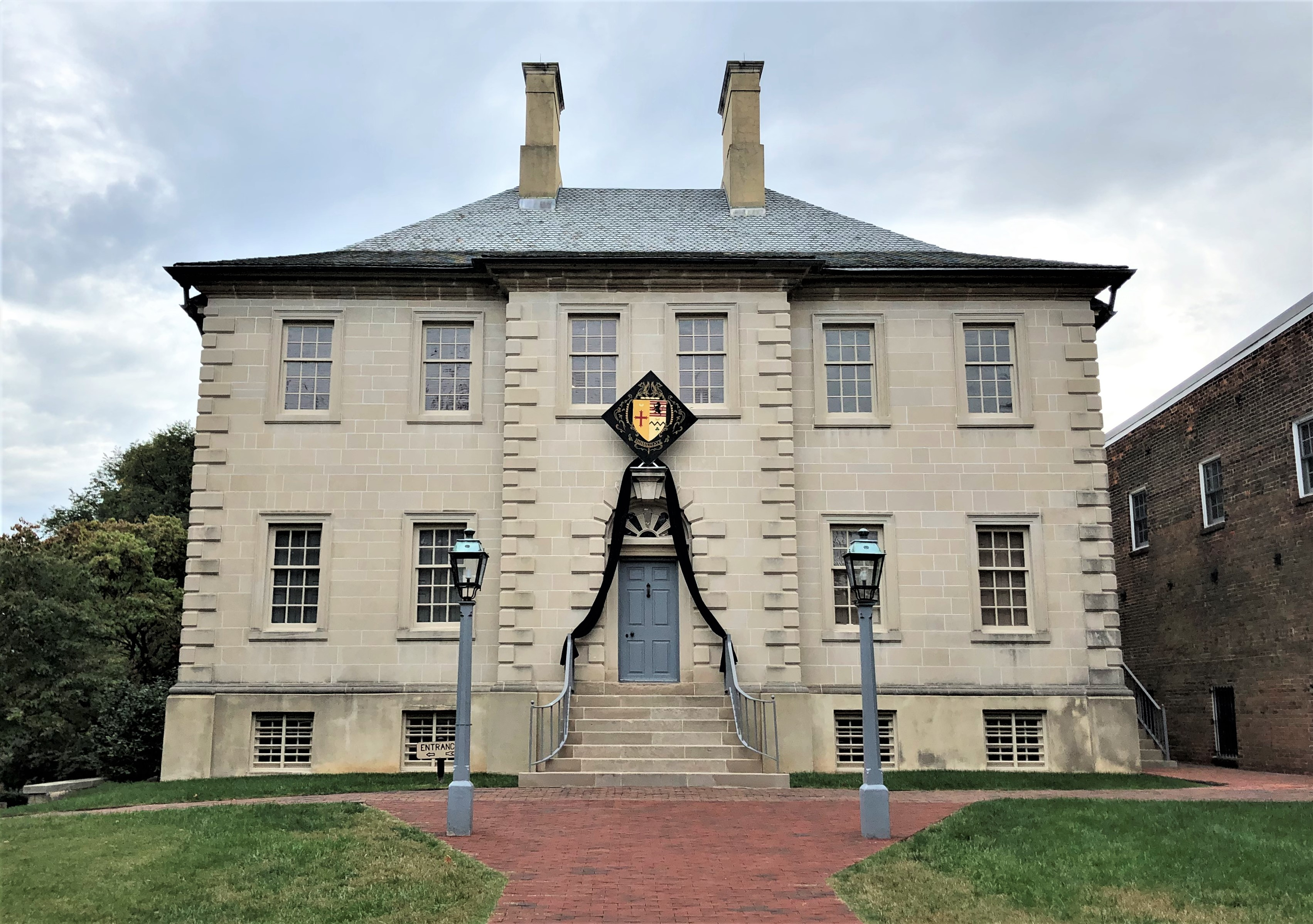
- (2021)

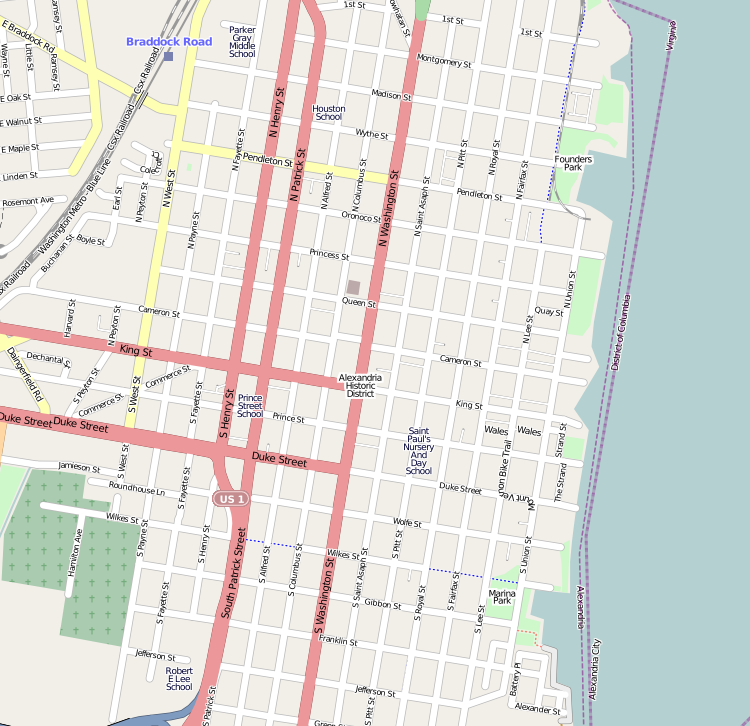
- Location within Alexandria Historical District Location within Alexandria Location within Northern Virginia Location within Virginia Location within the United States
- Location: 121 N. Fairfax St., Alexandria, Virginia
- Coordinates: 38°48′19″N 77°2′32″W
- Area: 1 acre (0.40 ha)
- Built: 1752
- Architectural style: Georgian
- NRHP reference No.: 69000333
- VLR No.: 100-0010

Significant dates
- Added to NRHP: November 12, 1969
- Designated VLR: May 13, 1969

Carlyle House is a historic mansion in Alexandria, Virginia, United States, built by Scottish merchant John Carlyle from 1751 to 1752 in the Georgian style.

It is situated in the city's Old Town at 121 North Fairfax Street between Cameron and King Street. To the west, the Gadsby's Tavern is found one block away and Christ Church is three blocks away. To the south, the Stabler-Leadbeater Apothecary Shop is located three blocks away. To the east, Torpedo Factory Art Center and the Alexandria Archaeology Museum are located two blocks away.

The house, which is architecturally unique as the only stone 18th-century Palladian Revival-style residence in Alexandria, was added to the National Register of Historic Places in 1969 and was restored in 1976.

== Construction ==
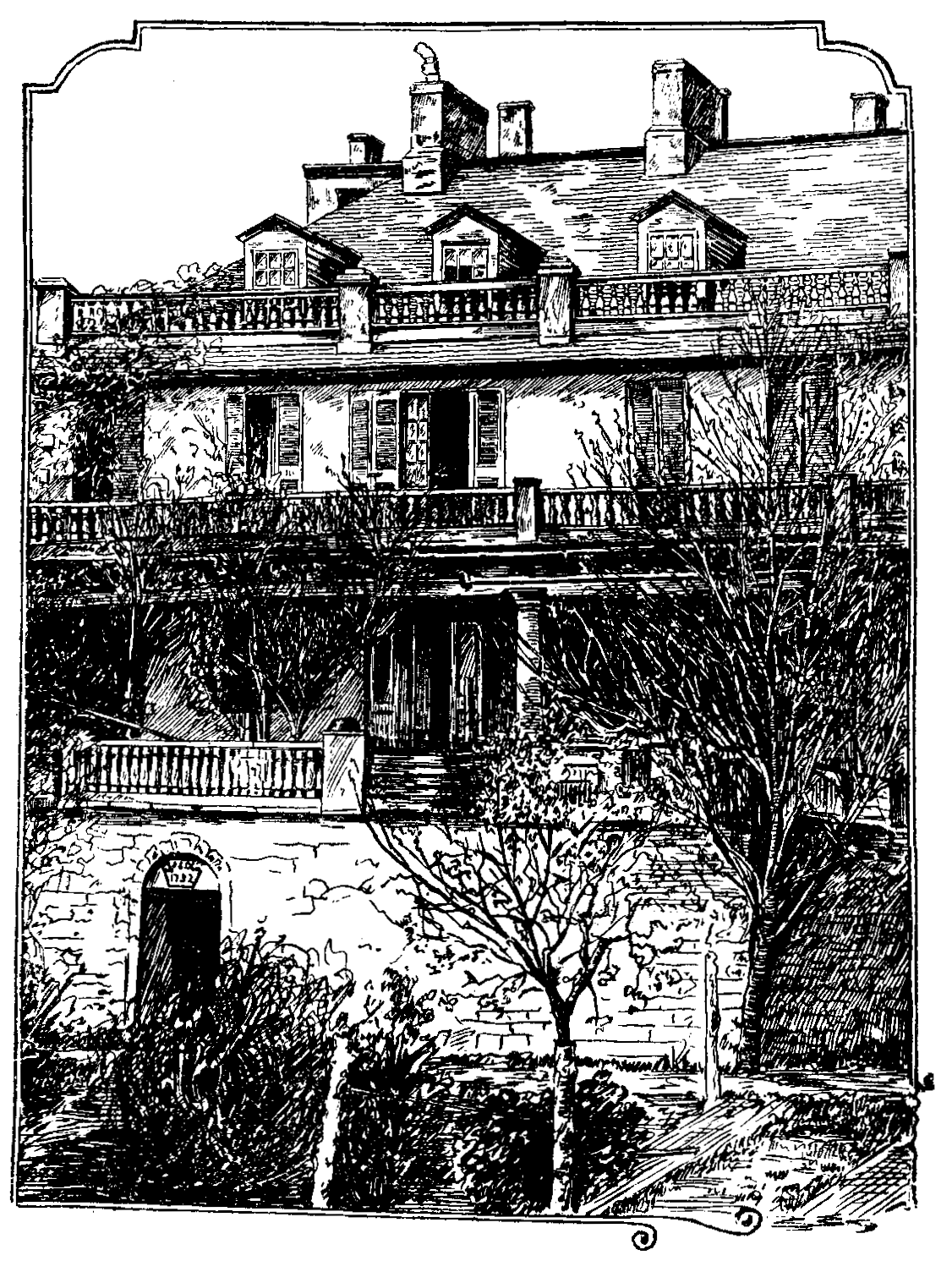
Illustration of the Carlyle House in 1752

Carlyle began the construction of his house in 1751, using indentured and slave labor. Carlyle house has two sets of stairs: The main stairs (wider) are located in the center of the house, they communicate the first floor with the second floor. The servant stairs (narrow) are located in the right side of the house and connect from the ground floor with the first and second floors. The house has two chimneys made of stone, they are the lungs of the house. The heat was obtained from the burning of charcoal and wood in the fireplaces; the heat ascended from the ground fireplaces to the fireplaces in the first and second floor, releasing the smoke to the exterior of the house and exchanging it with fresh air in the top of the chimney.

The doors were 6 foot 2 inches to keep in more heat during winter time when the door were open. The nails used to construct the house were handmade by a blacksmith. The house had space for entertaining, private, family, and servant use. The house has 3 closets, two in the main chamber, possibly to keep dishes locked up, and were used by servants after asking the lady of the house the menu for the day and the correct dishes to use for serving. A third closet is located in the music room. John Carlyle also built several outbuildings for both household and business needs. Carlyle or someone associated with the house's construction is believed to have sealed the body of a cat within the house's foundation for good luck, a custom that was prevalent in the British Isles and northern Europe.

=== Style ===
The home was built in stone in a mid-Georgian style, therefore has the following characteristics: It is symmetrical and balanced with halls in the center of each story, while the left and right side are copies of the other one from top to bottom; The right and the left side has two windows, and two chimneys, one on each side of the house. It has simple and bold details around the building and doors. The front door has an arched shape with bold molding and a bold keystone. It has quoins at the corner of the building. The house has a hipped roof, specifically a bonnet roof, also called reversed gambrel.

== Stories ==
The house is composed of a ground floor and two main floors. The halls are located in first and second floor, at the center of the house.

=== Ground floor ===
The kitchen, the servant stairs, and the cellars are located on the right side of the ground floor or basement. The spinning room is located on the left side of the ground floor. It has a back door that connects to the gardens.

=== First story ===
The first floor contains the main or front door that separates the yard from the main hall, which is located in the center of the house. The main stairs are located at the back area of the hall, which also has a back door that communicates with the magnolia terrace, the back yard and the garden of the house. The left side of the floor is the more public side of the floor, in which the music room and the dining room are located. The right side of the floor (when seen from the front of the house) is the more private side of the house, in it is located the main chamber (John Carlyle's bedroom), and in front of it, John Carlyle's studio and the servants' stairs.

The visitors that came through the front door were received by a servant (Moses) at the main hall. During celebrations the hall was used as a dance hall, currently, it displays a copy of the Fry-Jefferson map, painted by Peter Jefferson (Thomas Jefferson's father) and Joshua Fry on its wall.

The music room is located beside the main entrance, in this room Sarah Carlyle Fairfax (Sally) practiced the spinet songs that she and her mother learned when they received music lessons at Mount Vernon (George Washington's house and plantation).

Plan of second floor and attic

The portrait of John's brother, George Carlyle, is located in this room. The color of the wallpaper is green. It has a fireplace.

The dining room is located next to the music room. It is preserved in its original form and looks as it would have appeared in the 1750s, as there were not many modifications in this area. The color of the wallpaper is blue, the details of the wood were handmade and the color of the walls and room were used to welcome and impress their guests. It also has a fireplace to warm up the room in winter. The portrait of William Carlyle (John Carlyle's father) is located in this room.

The main chamber was located in the right side of the house, beside the main door. It belonged at the time to John Carlyle and his wife Sarah Fairfax. The two windows in the bedroom faced the front of the street. It has a portrait of his mother, Rachel Murray Carlyle (painted when she was in her twenties), which was located in front of their bed and above the fireplace. A replica of Sarah Carlyle's wedding dress is exhibited in the room, a close-bodied gown with a petticoat (it used a mechanism to fold it when passing through narrow doors). The wooden floor in front of the fireplace of the bedroom has visible burn marks resulting from the explosions of the air trapped in the charcoal and wood resins: at the time the fire screen had not yet been invented. It is possible that the two lockers in the bedroom were used to lock up their cloth and or their dishes.

In front of the main chamber are John Carlyle's studio and the servant stairs that communicate with the ground and second floors.

John Carlyle's studio is located in front of his room. It contains his desk, a divan and a copy of the John Carlyle portrait that was sent to his brother. In the portrait his hand is painted inside his waistcoat, this represents a painting technique that started in 1750 called hand-in-waistcoat. The style was used to indicate leadership in a calm and firm manner, and at the same time, it was easier to paint. The room was also used as a dinner table for the family to spare the main dining room. The floor was made of silk and it had rhomboid patterns. At the time, ships arriving to the dock could be seen through the studio windows. The room also contains a fireplace.

=== Second story ===
John Carlyle's children's bedrooms were located on the second floor. The second-floor hall is located at the center of the house and above the main floor hall and is accessible to the first floor both through the main stairs and through the servant stairs.

In the hall many books are displayed, among them an 8th edition of The Gardeners Dictionary by Philip Miller (1768), the 16th edition of The Gardeners Kalendar, also by Philip Miller, and Volumes II and III of The Poets of Great Britain by John Bell that collect the works of Alexander Pope.

George William Carlyle's room was located on the left side of the floor.

Sarah Carlyle Fairfax and Anne Carlyle's room was located in front of their brother's. In this bedroom, there is a copy of Sarah Carlyle Fairfax's wedding dress on display. It is probable that Penelope (Penny) took care of Sally and Anne and slept with them during wintertime to share body heat, or slept in front of their bed or in the aisle between the bedrooms.

On the right side of the second floor is located a room showing the way the house was originally constructed, which also has a fireplace. In front of it are located the servant stairs and another room.

=== Front yard ===
At the time a regulation stipulated that no house would use a front yard to maximize the use of space. To solve the obstacle Carlyle bought 2 lots, lot 41 and lot 42, and it became the only house with a wide front yard in the area. At the time, Carlyle was a member of the board of trustees that regulated the use of the land in the city.

=== Back yard ===
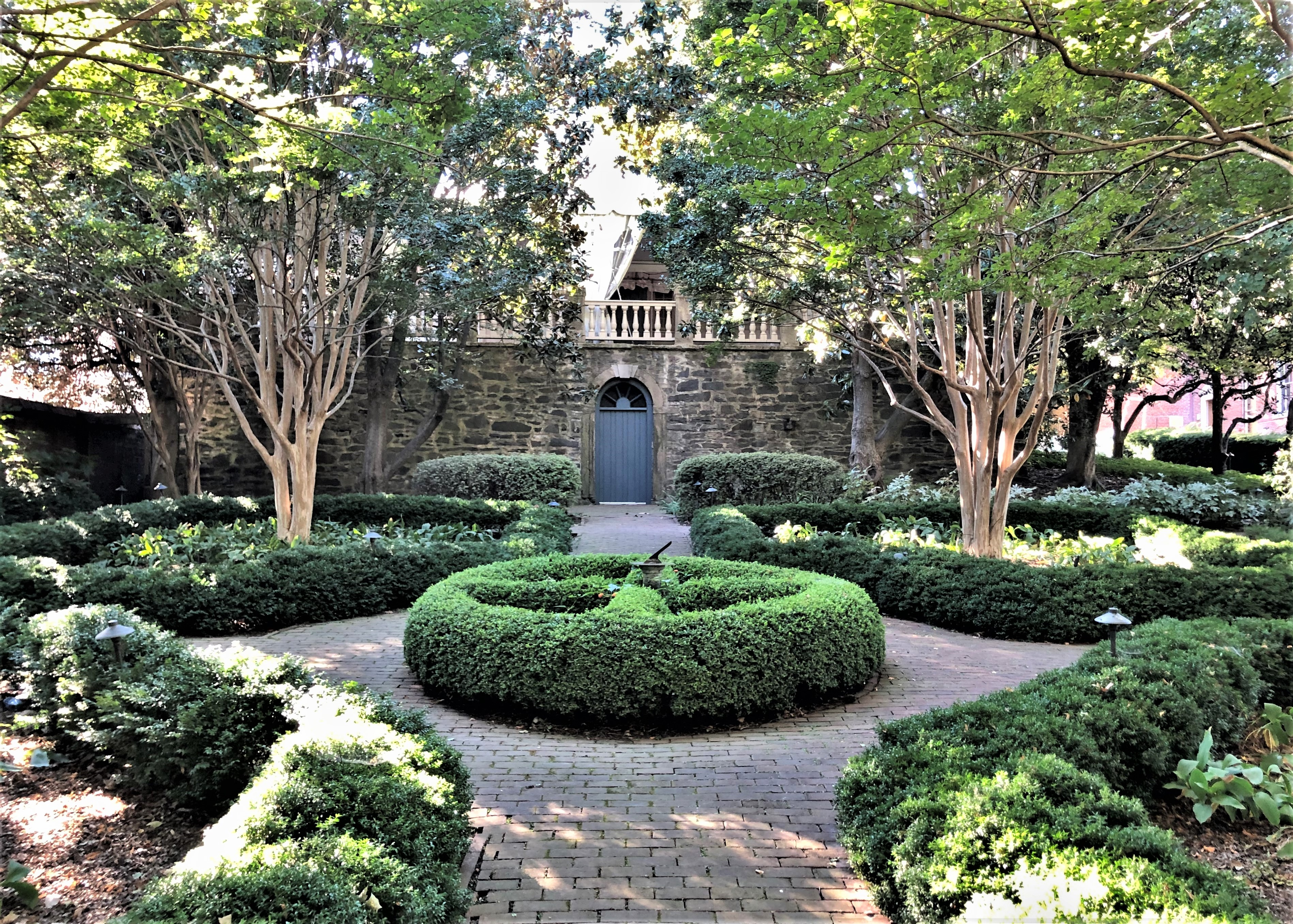
Gardens of the Carlyle House and a view of the back door of the ground floor and the Magnolia Terrace on the main floor

In the 1700s the backyard was located in front of the river, but during the following decades the land was expanded filling the area with old boats and other materials, today is located in front of N. Lee Street and at two blocks of distance from the Potomac river.

== History ==
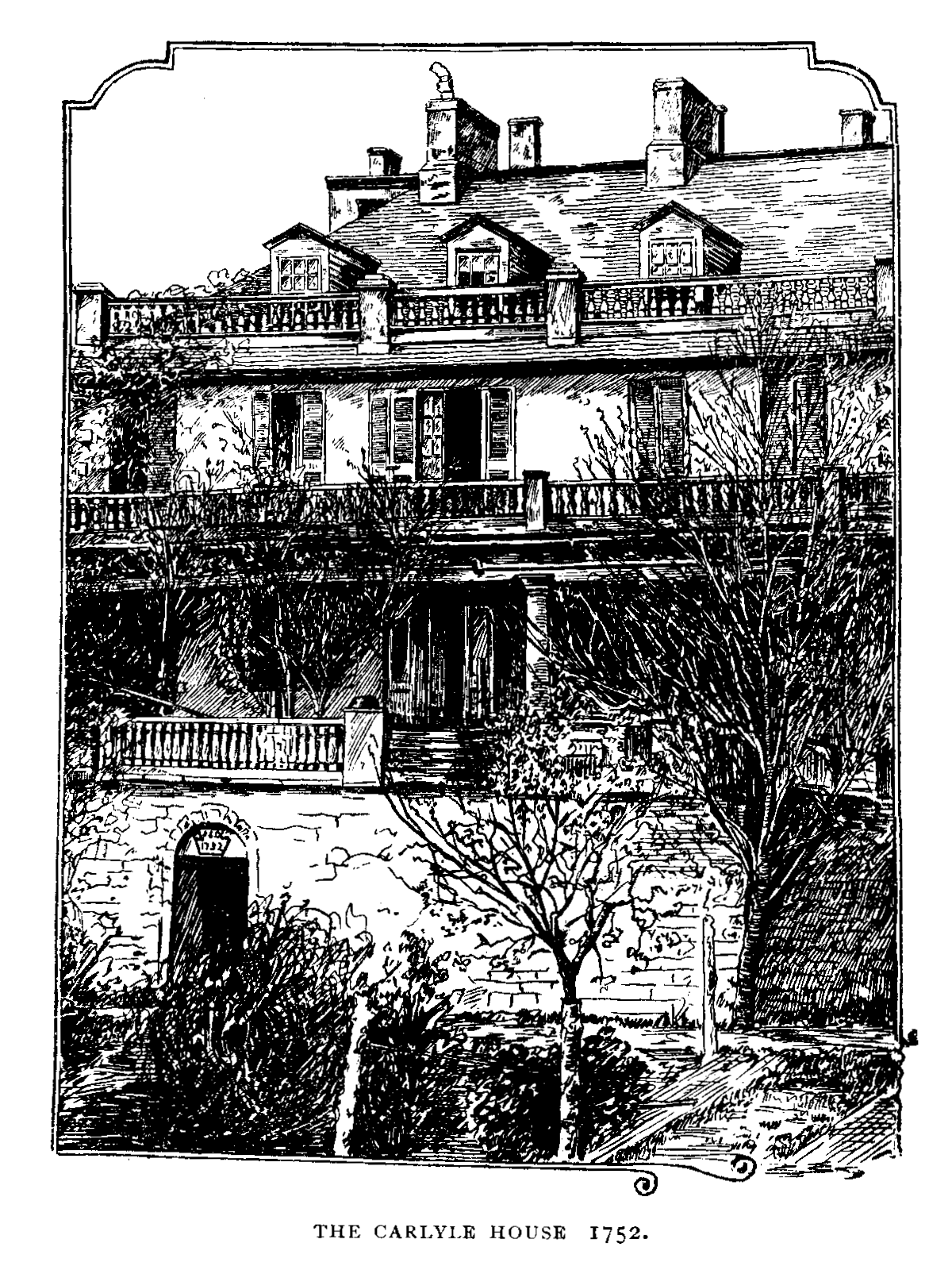
1909 drawing showing the ground area, the magnolia terrace, and the second floor in a view from the back side of the Carlyle House

George Washington, a native Virginian who studied mathematics, trigonometry, and land surveying in Lower Church, prepared two maps of what later became the city of Alexandria. The first map was the "Plat of the Land" drawn in 1748: it was a copy of a prior map.

When the lots for the new town of Alexandria were auctioned in July 1749, John Carlyle purchased the lots 41 and 42, situated between the Potomac River and the town's market square, ideal for his merchant business.

=== Congress of Alexandria ===
King George II sent Edward Braddock with two regiments of British regulars (2500 troops) to America to fight in the French and Indian War that started in 1754, they arrived on 20 February 1755 in Hampton, in the colony of Virginia. In April 1755 they came to Carlyle house, and it became the initial headquarters for Major-General Edward Braddock in the Colony of Virginia. On April 15, 1755, was held the Congress of Alexandria in which Braddock met with five colonial governors, Horatio Sharpe (Maryland's governor ), Robert Dinwiddie (Virginia's governor), James De Lancey (New York's governor), William Shirley (Massachusetts' governor), and Robert Hunter Morris (Pennsylvania's governor).

They convened in the dining room of the house and here Braddock first suggested the idea of levying additional new taxes on the colonists to help with the cost of the war, and also decided to make an expedition to Fort Duquesne during the French and Indian War. George Washington, who was appointed as major in the provincial militia in February 1753 by Robert Dinwiddie (Virginia's Royal Governor), urged Braddock not to undertake the expedition and became a volunteer aide-de-camp to Braddock. Nevertheless, Braddock decided to undertake the expedition, resulting in the death or injury of two-thirds of Braddock's troops and also in Braddock's own death.

=== Slavery ===
Carlyle was a slaveholder for much of his life, and derived much of his personal fortune from both slavery and the Atlantic slave trade. He utilised them as forced labour in both his household and his multiple business ventures. As with many other slave owners of the period, Carlyle held a paternalistic approach towards his slaves, and considered them primarily as parts of his assets. He was also "active in importing, buying, selling and owning slaves", which was a common activity at that time.

Many of Carlyle's slaves lived and worked in his properties; in the Carlyle House, in a foundry located on the same lot as the house and on his three slave plantations. When Carlyle died in 1780, there were nine slaves living at the Carlyle House: Moses, Nanny, Jerry, Joe, Cate, Sibreia, Cook, Charles and Penny. In the colonial era, as many as twenty-five slaves might have lived and worked within its walls and in the various outbuildings, and the jobs they could have done included being a blacksmith, chef, nanny or domestic worker.

=== American Revolutionary War ===
During the American Revolutionary War, John Carlyle died in 1780. His son, George William Carlyle, inherited the house but was killed in action at the Battle of Eutaw Springs in South Carolina one year later. John Carlyle Herbert inherited the Carlyle House in 1781. The house passed from the family's possession by 1827 when Sarah Carlyle died. John Carlyle Herbert sold it to pay off an uncle's gambling debt, while he had moved to Maryland in the first decade of the 19th century.

A wealthy Alexandria merchant, John Lloyd, owned extensive tracts of real estate both in and outside of town, and ended up acquiring possession of the Carlyle House. Not successful in selling the property, Lloyd offered the structure as a possible site for the new city and county courthouse to be constructed in Alexandria in 1838. This proposal was rejected and Lloyd continued to lease the premises to a number of renters until it was sold in 1848 to James Green, the owner of Green and Brother Furniture Factory, a noted Alexandria furniture manufacturer.

=== Civil War ===
By 1860 Carlyle House owner James Green completed many major renovations to the Carlyle House. He also created a hotel in front of the house known as the Mansion House Hotel, which was known as one of the best hotels on the East Coast. With the building of the hotel fronting Fairfax Street, the Carlyle House was no longer visible from the street.

At the onset of the Civil War, Union troops occupied the city of Alexandria, including the Mansion House Hotel, in November 1860 Green received notice to vacate in December since the Mansion Hotel was going to be confiscated. The troops converted it to a hospital for Union soldiers, after the Battle of Bull Run. It could treat more than 700 wounded soldiers, and nurses were mostly female, but at the time there were not many female medical doctors in the country.

During the Civil War, this house and the city of Alexandria itself, that once used slave force, became one of the principal centers that supported the fight against slavery and hold a key role in the abolition of slavery in the United States in the 19th century.

=== World War I and World War II ===
During World War I the house became a museum, and was located two blocks from the U.S. Naval Torpedo Station in Alexandria. By the mid-twentieth century the building was in a state of great disrepair due to a lack of proper maintenance.

== House owners ==
In 1749 half-acre (lots 41 and 42) were auctioned in Alexandria, Virginia, John Carlyle bought them and completed the house in 1753, he was the owner until 1780, when he was killed during American Revolution.

John Carlyle's son, George William Carlyle, became the owner of the house in 1780 after his father's death, but he died the following year in the Battle of Eutaw Springs during the American Revolutionary War.

In 1781 John Carlyle Herbert (John Carlyle's grandson) inherited Carlyle House in 1781, since his mother Sarah Carlyle Fairfax (John Carlyle's daughter) was a woman, and women were not allowed to own land in the United States at the time (until it was allowed by law in 1839). She died in 1827, and the house was sold to John Lloyd in 1827 by John Carlyle Herbert to pay off one of his uncle's gambling debt.

John Lloyd rented the area until it was sold in 1848 to James Green and part of the area became the Green Hotel for a decade until it was confiscated for a year by the Union and was converted into a Hospital during the Civil War in the United States, in 1965 it was returned to James Green, it became an apartment building in the early 20th century.

In 1865 the hotel was returned to the Green family. After Green's death in 1880, the hotel and the Carlyle House along with it, changed hands frequently and was acquired by new proprietors and renamed as Braddock House. It was not until 1906, when the buildings were bought by Earnest Wagar, that a major restoration of the house as a historic site was commenced.

NOVA Parks acquired the house and apartments in 1970 and fully restored the house in 1976 as part of United States Bicentennial celebration.

== Carlyle House Historic Park ==
Carlyle House was renamed to Carlyle House Historic Park and is owned, protected, and operated by the NOVA Parks Agency of Northern Virginia.

The park was created by the demolition of two-thirds of the dilapidated Mansion House Hospital (1840, expanded 1855) that was located in front of the house, leaving behind the original Bank of Alexandria building (1807), still extant at 133 North Fairfax Street.

=== Carlyle House restoration ===
In 1969, the decision was made by the Northern Virginia Regional Park Authority to acquire and restore the property as a public national historic site. A survey of the site and existing buildings was initiated in October, 1970. On July 17, 1970, the Authority acquired the Carlyle Apartments for $305,000. The house itself was purchased for $193,000 in 1971 and the remaining portion of the land for $210,000 the following year. Significant restoration work to the house was undertaken in the early and mid 1970s.

The house was planned to be turn down and reconstruct, but a technique to support the building was chosen instead to preserve all the details. The cat's remains were discovered during restoration work in the 1970s and the remains were put back in their original place in the basement of the house.

The restoration of the house and gardens was then directed by Beth R. Sundquist, project director, under the supervision of the Authority's executive director, William M. Lightsey.

The project involved tearing down the apartments (also known as the Braddock Hotel), once again exposing Carlyle House to North Fairfax Street, and then turning the mansion itself into an 18th-century museum. This meant not only rehabilitating the structure as authentically as possible, but also tracking down and purchasing original fixtures and furniture, where possible, or acquiring equivalent examples from the period. About a dozen pieces believed to have been in the house during the Carlyle family's occupancy were recovered by the time the house was opened to the public on January 23, 1976.

The park, which opened in January 1976, includes the 18th-century Carlyle House mansion and its gardens, listed on the National Register of Historic Places.

== Events ==
The "Grandest Congress" is a reenactment celebrating General Braddock's time at the house that takes place on April 15 of every year at the Carlyle House.

"Yoga on the Magnolia Terrace" are Yoga Classes hold at the Magnolia Terrace every Tuesday, Thursday and Saturday at 6 P.M. starting in April and ending in October of each year.

== In popular culture ==
James Phinney Munroe edited and published in 1904 the book Adventures of an Army Nurse in Two Wars based on the diaries and correspondence of Mary Phinney von Olnhausen. The first part of the book talks about the lives of the people that worked in the Mansion House Hospital in Alexandria during the Civil War. The second part about her work also as a nurse in 1870 in the Franco-Prussian War.

Mercy Street (TV series) was a fictional medical drama based in the book Adventures of an Army Nurse in Two Wars and produced by PBS in 2016 and 2017, it had 2 seasons with 6 episodes in each one.

Paper & Stone: The hidden history of John Carlyle, is a 30-minute DVD-Documentary about the life, history and recent discoveries of the John Carlyle family. It was produced in 2005 by Robert Cole Films & The Carlyle House Historic Park. The DVD has also a 10 minutes video called "Don't get weary" that talks and is about the life of the slaves that worked in the house and in the area.

== See also ==
List of museums in Virginia
