= Mansion House Hospital =

Demolished building in Virginia, US

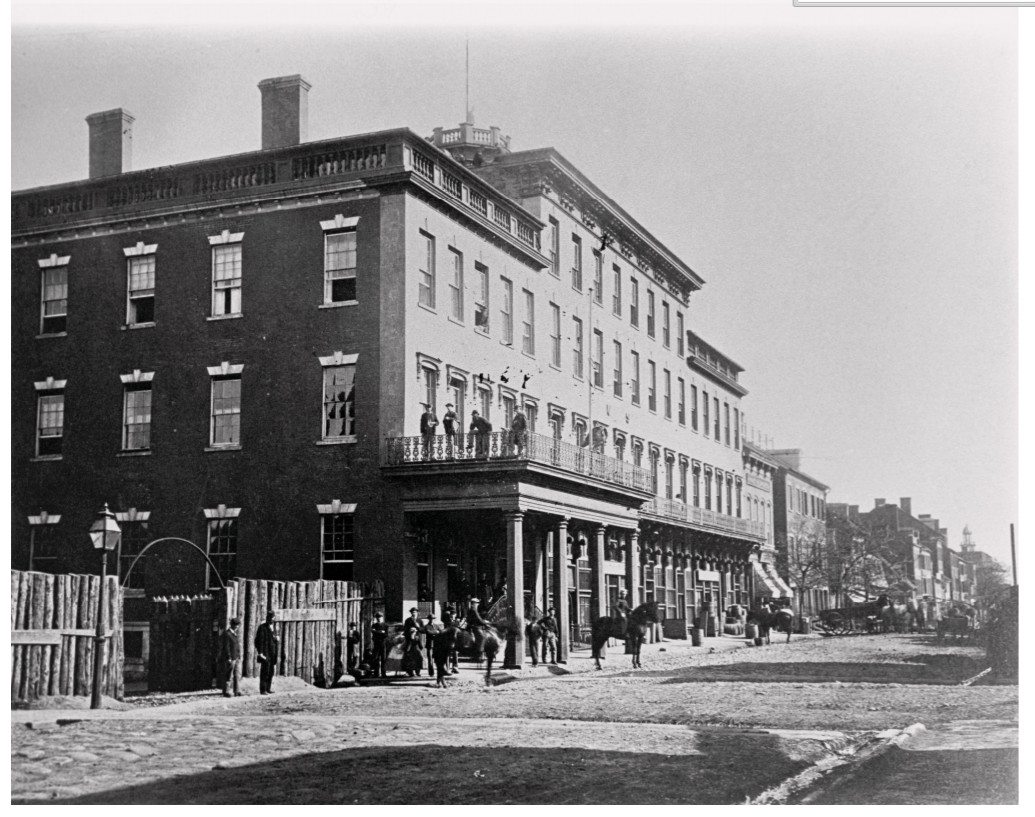
- The Mansion House Hotel served as a hospital during the occupation of Alexandria, Virginia by Union forces, during the Civil War

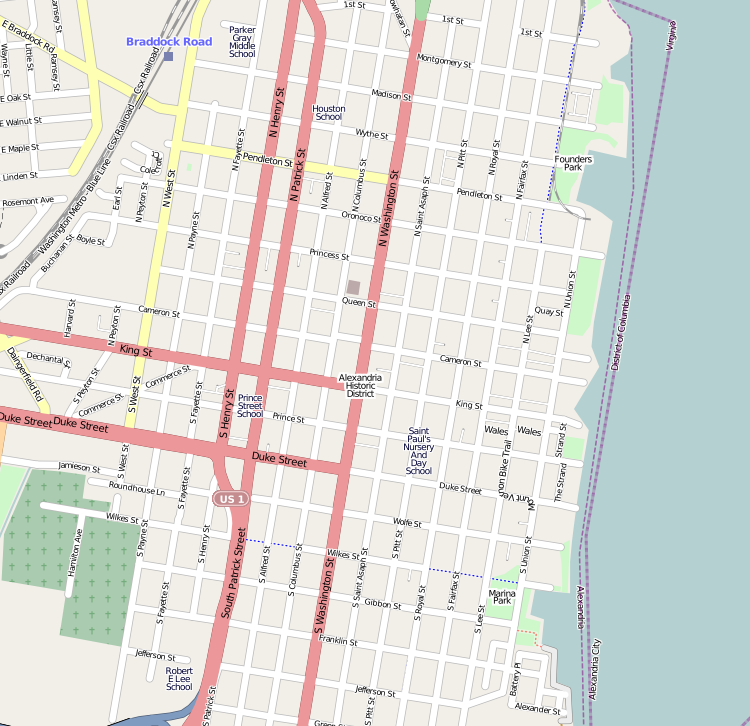
- Location within Alexandria Historical District Location within Virginia Location within the United States

General information
- Type: Hotel
- Location: 121 N. Fairfax Street, Alexandria, Virginia, United States
- Coordinates: 38°48′19″N 77°2′32″W
- Opened: 1860
- Renovated: 1906
- Demolished: 1970s

Mansion House Hospital was a Union hospital during the American Civil War, formed after Union occupation of Alexandria, Virginia and the seizure of the Mansion House Hotel.

== History ==
=== Mansion House Hotel ===
The hospital was built in the old Mansion House Hotel, an establishment also known as Green's Hotel operated by furniture manufacturer James Green. In 1848, Green acquired the former Bank of Alexandria building and converted it into a hotel. In 1855, a four-story addition on the building's east side was built, in front of the Carlyle House mansion. This made it the largest hotel in Alexandria. Green received a notice in early November 1861, stating he had three days to vacate the hotel.

=== Military hospital ===
On December 1, 1861, Mansion House Hospital was opened as a General Hospital. Parts of the nearby Bank of Alexandria building at 133 North Fairfax Street were also used as part of the hospital, as were parts of the Carlyle House behind the hotel. The facility could hold 700 soldiers as patients.

The hospital used female nurses, which by the spring of 1862, resulted in harsh treatment and prejudice towards nurses based on their gender. Nurses such as Mary Phinney, however, kept accounts and “helped set the stage for women not just in nursing, but in the medical profession as a whole.”

In March 1862, there was a court case concerning conditions at The Mansion Hospital, concerning the behavior of surgeon J. B. Porter, after allegations of mistreatment of patients were published in the New-York Tribune and Washington National Republican on February 6, 1862. A Court of Assembly met on the issue in February 1862 led by General William H. French, and determined that the complaints were not valid, and that “the Court, from its own observation, cannot speak too highly of the condition of the Mansion Hospital, which is exhibited in the fact, that out of 500 patients, there have been but 32 deaths.”

On September 20, 1862, people began using the hospital as a First Division General Hospital, and it was the largest of the confiscated buildings used as a military hospital in the city, out of 30 total converted hospitals in the city. It could hold up to 700 sick and wounded soldiers. The hospital was the largest Union hospital in the region, with 500 beds.

=== After the war ===
Following the surrender of the Confederacy on April 9, 1865, the Mansion House Hospital was returned to the Greens and reopened as a hotel. First again called the Mansion House Hotel, it was then acquired by new proprietors in the early 1880s and renamed Braddock House. By 1886, it was advertised as the only first-class hotel in the city.

By the 1970s, the building was vacant and deteriorating. The Northern Virginia Regional Park Authority acquired the entire property, and – despite protests from some preservationists – in early 1973 the expanded portion of the building – then known as the Carlyle Apartments – was torn down in order to open Carlyle House to view from Fairfax Street and create open area for Carlyle House Historic Park. However, a portion of the old hospital was partly preserved in the original bank building. which was added to the National Register of Historic Places in 1973.

== In popular culture ==
The book Adventures of an Army Nurse in Two Wars was edited in 1903 by James Phinney Munroe and it was published in 1904, it is based in the diaries and correspondence of Mary Phinney von Olnhausen. The first par of the book talk about the lives of the people that worked in the Mansion House Hospital in Alexandria and also her work at the Mansfield General Hospital at Morehead, North Carolina. The second part about her work also as a nurse in 1870 in the Franco-Prussian War.

In 2016 PBS broadcast a miniseries, Mercy Street, set in the hospital. The PBS drama is set in 1862. Some of the characters are based on real historical figures associated with the hospital, for example the Green family and nurse Mary Phinney von Olnhausen.

Pulitzer Prize-winning novel Night Watch is partially set within a fictionalized version of Mansion House Hospital.

== See also ==
- Mary Phinney
- Benjamin Franklin Stringfellow
- Emma Green
