= Emma Green (nurse) =

American nurse

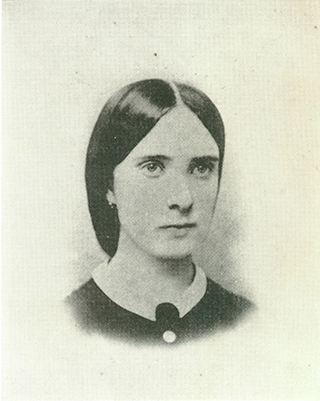
- Born: Feb. 9, 1843; Alexandria, Virginia
- Died: 1929 (aged 85–86)
- Occupations: Spy, society woman
- Children: 4

Emma Green (1843–1929) was an American involved in Civil War intrigue in Alexandria, Virginia. Described as a Southern belle, her politics shifted from pro-Union or neutral during the Civil War, after the Union seized her family's hotel to serve as the Mansion House Hospital.

A fictionalized version of her is played by Hannah James in Mercy Street, where the character is a nurse.

== Early life ==
Emma Green was born in 1843 into a wealthy and socially aspiring family in Alexandria, Virginia. She was raised in a devout Episcopalian household. She had three brothers who lived in town, three older sisters, and three younger sisters. She grew up in the Carlyle House in Alexandria along with her older sister Lydia, her mother Jane Muir Green, and her father James. In her youth, Emma Green sometimes stayed at the adjacent Mansion Hotel House owned by her family, or stayed at their 232 acre family farm outside town called The Grove.

Her father, James Green, was the owner of the Mansion House Hotel and also the richest man in Alexandria by 1859. His hotel housed boarders, servants, and 16 slaves, including several enslaved children. The family also owned the Green & Brother furniture factory, which when the Civil War reached the outskirts of Alexandria in 1860, was confiscated as a prison for Union deserters. Emma's brothers were not directly involved in owning or renting slaves, unlike their father. Her little sister Alice died in March 1860 of a sudden illness. Her two eldest sisters Mary and Elizabeth married into the Stringfellow family, Sarah married into the Jacobs family, and Lydia never married. By 1861, Green had made the acquaintance of her future husband Frank Stringfellow, a student in Alexandria. He then began teaching Latin in Mississippi at age 20, to earn money to marry Green.

== The Civil War ==
After Virginia voted to secede from the United States on May 24, 1861, Green's father received a notice in early November 1861, stating he had three days to vacate the hotel. The Union Army took over the building on November 11, 1861, with the Green family to receive rent from the government in the future. On December 1, 1861, Mansion House Hospital was opened as a General Hospital. Green's family initially had pro-Union sympathies due to their manufacturing background, but increasingly sided with the Confederates as the Civil War progressed. Green's own politics shifted from pro-Union or neutral during the Civil War, possibly influenced by the strong Confederate leanings of her fiance.

During the war, Green's fiancé Benjamin Franklin "Frank" Stringfellow operated as a Confederate spy. It is possible that Green assisted in the espionage. Enlisting in the Confederate Army at the start of the war, in January 1862, Stringfellow was sent to spy in Alexandria under the guise of a dental assistant. At one point in April, in the dentist office Green incidentally encountered him and called him by name, but they succeeded in not raising suspicions. They avoided further contact through 1862 while he remained with the dentist, before he left Alexandria for other missions as a scout and spy. On September 20, 1862, people began using the Green family hotel as a First Division General Hospital, and it was the largest of the confiscated buildings used as a military hospital in the city, able to hold up to 700 sick and wounded soldiers.

Stringfellow returned again to Alexandria in 1863, again on a mission to spy and recruit new agents. He took the opportunity to meet Green, and they had several meetings with Frank using the name R.M. Franklin. He left the city again after a near exposure of his identity. According to some historians, such as author Virginia Morton, Green assisted Stringfellow throughout 1863. In one story told by Morton, one day "Stringfellow proceeded to Emma’s house alone but discovered Union officers occupying the upper levels. Undeterred, he crept into the cellar from the back of the house and asked Emma’s maid to fetch her… Emma agreed to call on the informers and returned within a few hours with vital information of Union Gen. Irvin McDowell’s planned attack."

Stringfellow again returned to Washington in March 1865, and reports say that Green moved to live with family friends in an effort to be closer to him. She rendezvoused with Frank Stringfellow in 1865 at gatherings of Union friends, when he was undercover spying for Jefferson Davis and courting her. However, by the end of the war he was known as dangerous, and had a $10,000 bounty for his capture. When Richmond fell, Stringfellow left for Virginia, and discovered he was a rumored accomplice in Lincoln's assassination. He left for Canada. Following the surrender of the Confederacy on April 9, 1865, the Mansion House Hospital was returned to the Greens and reopened as a hotel, operating as the Mansion House Hotel until it was then acquired by new proprietors in the early 1880s.

== Later life and family ==
After the war, Green moved to the boarding school Woodberry Forest School near Alexandria. Green and Stringfellow reunited after the war when he returned from his flight into Canada in 1867, and they married on January 23, 1867. Frank became an Episcopalian minister, and they had four children together: Ida (b. 1867), Alice Lee (b. 1871), Frank (b. 1881) and John Stanton (b. 1883).

In 1883 the Green family was awarded late rent by the US government for its use of the Mansion House Hotel, after both of Emma Green's parents had died. After her husband died in 1913, Green died in 1929, with their tombstone at the Ivy Hill Cemetery in Alexandria.

== Cultural legacy ==
In 2016, PBS began broadcasting Mercy Street, a television series based on the hospital in the Green family hotel, the Mansion House Hospital, set in 1862. A fictionalized version of Emma Green is a key character in the series, serving as a nurse, and is played by Hannah James. Through local friends, James contacted great-great-grandchildren of Green's, who shared relics, clothing, and stories that had belonged to her.

The real Emma Green served only as a template for the depiction on the show. The only details that the two women share are that Emma Green was a daughter of the Greens who owned the Mansion House Hotel and that she was engaged to Frank Stringfellow. The real Emma Green was never a nurse. Her husband was also never implicated in an assassination plot.

== See also ==
- Mary Phinney
- Benjamin Franklin Stringfellow
