= Benjamin Franklin Stringfellow =

Benjamin Franklin Stringfellow may refer to:

- Benjamin Franklin Stringfellow (1816–1891), 19th century railway tycoon
- Benjamin Franklin Stringfellow (1840–1913), Confederate spy
