= Lisa Quijano Wolfinger =

American television producer, director, and writer

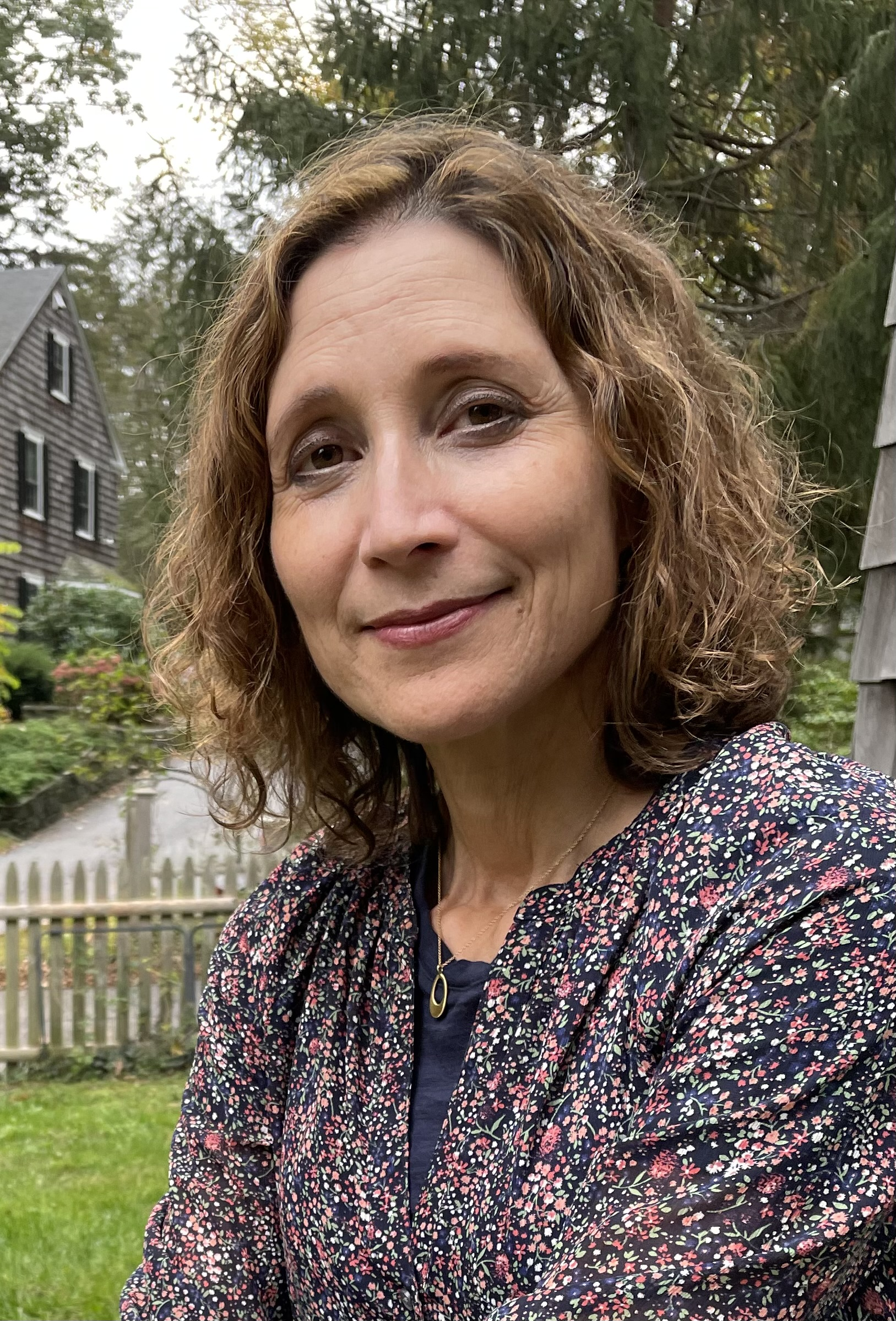
- Wolfinger in 2025
- Occupations: Television producer, director, writer
- Years active: 2000–present
- Known for: Mercy Street, Wild Crime, The Lesson Is Murder
- Spouse: Kirk Wolfinger
- Awards: Gracie Award (2017), Cine Golden Eagle Award

Lisa Quijano Wolfinger is an American television producer, director, and writer. She is the co-founder of Lone Wolf Media, an independent production company based in Maine. Wolfinger has worked across documentary, docudrama, and scripted television for outlets including PBS, National Geographic, History Channel, Smithsonian Channel, ABC News Studios, and Hulu.

== Career ==
In 2000, Wolfinger produced, co-wrote, and co-directed Mayday: Lost at Sea, a National Geographic special. She subsequently produced and directed Fire on the Mountain (2001) for the History Channel, which received a News & Documentary Emmy nomination and won a Cine Golden Eagle Award.

Wolfinger produced the four-part limited series Conquest of America (2005), writing and directing two episodes. In 2006, she created and directed the three-part docudrama Desperate Crossing: The Untold Story of the Mayflower, which received two Primetime Emmy Award nominations.

She later worked as a freelance director on historical recreation projects, including Pocahontas Revealed (2007), Across the Pacific (2019), and USS Indianapolis: The Final Chapter (2019), all for PBS. In 2007, she served as a series director during development of the Discovery Channel docudrama project Forged in Fire.

Wolfinger co-created and served as executive producer of Mercy Street (2016–2017), a Civil War–era scripted drama for PBS. The series ran for two seasons. In 2017, she received a Gracie Award for Outstanding Producer – Entertainment for her work on Mercy Street.

Wolfinger created, executive produced and directed the true crime anthology series Wild Crime (2021–2024) for ABC News Studios and Hulu. She also created and directed The Lesson Is Murder (2023) for Hulu. In 2023, she produced and directed The War on Disco for PBS's American Experience.

== Selected filmography ==
- Fire on the Mountain (2001) – producer, director, writer
- Witch Hunt (2004) – producer, director, writer
- Conquest of America (2005) – producer, writer, director
- Desperate Crossing: The Untold Story of the Mayflower (2006) – producer, writer, director
- Mercy Street (2016–2017) – co-creator, executive producer, writer
- The Kids We Lose (2018) – director, writer
- America's Hidden Stories (2019–2020) – executive producer, director
- Wild Crime (2021–2024) – executive producer, director
- The Lesson Is Murder (2023) – executive producer, director
