= Bank of Alexandria (Alexandria, Virginia) =

Historic building in Virginia, US

- U.S. National Register of Historic Places
- U.S. Historic district – Contributing property
- Virginia Landmarks Register
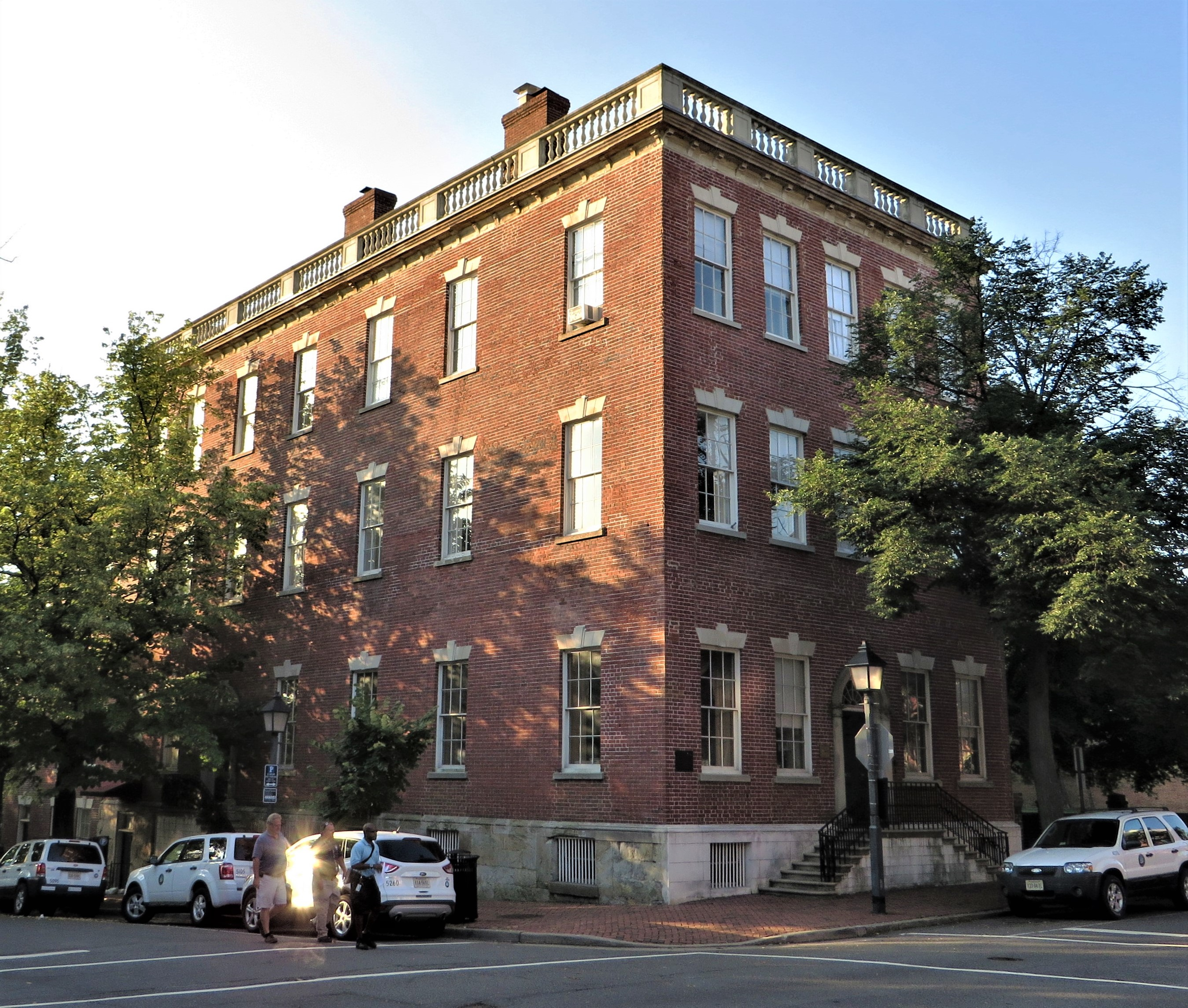
- (2014)

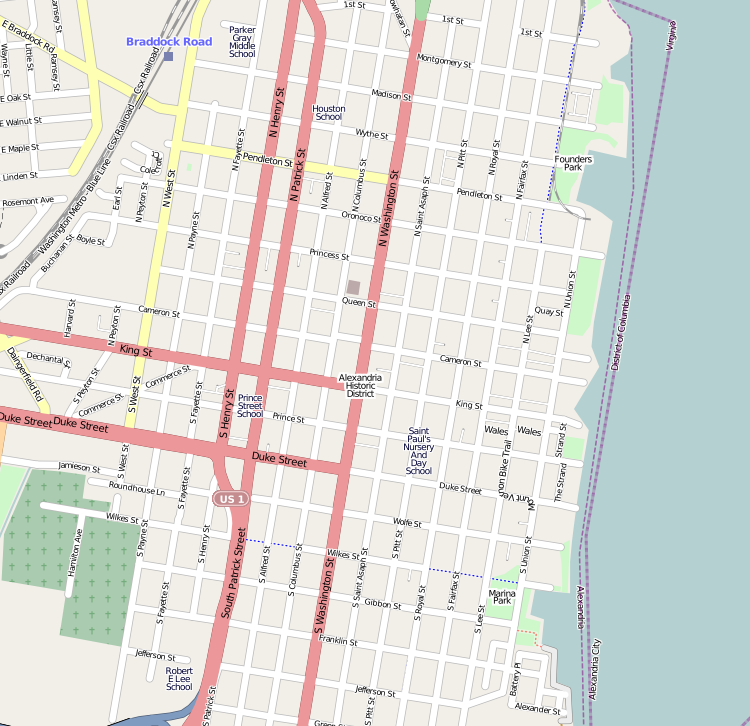
- Location within Alexandria Historical District Location within Virginia Location within the United States
- Location: 133 N. Fairfax St., Alexandria, Virginia
- Coordinates: 38°48′19″N 77°2′33″W
- Built: 1807
- NRHP reference No.: 73002202
- VLR No.: 100-0004

Significant dates
- Added to NRHP: June 4, 1973
- Designated VLR: April 17, 1973

The Bank of Alexandria is a historic bank building located at Alexandria, Virginia, United States. It was built in 1807, and consists of a three-story main block, with a two-story east wing. The main block is five bays wide and 7 bays deep. In 1848, James Green purchased the building and turned it into a hotel, then in 1855, he expanded it across the lawn of the Carlyle House next door, tripling the size of the Mansion House Hotel. The hotel was used as a hospital during the Civil War. In the late 1960's, the expansion, by then an aging apartment building, was torn down by the Northern Virginia Regional Park Authority to reveal Carlyle House, which was restored in 1976.

The remaining part of the bank building was listed on the U.S. National Register of Historic Places in 1973. It is located in the Alexandria Historic District.
