= John Carlyle (merchant) =

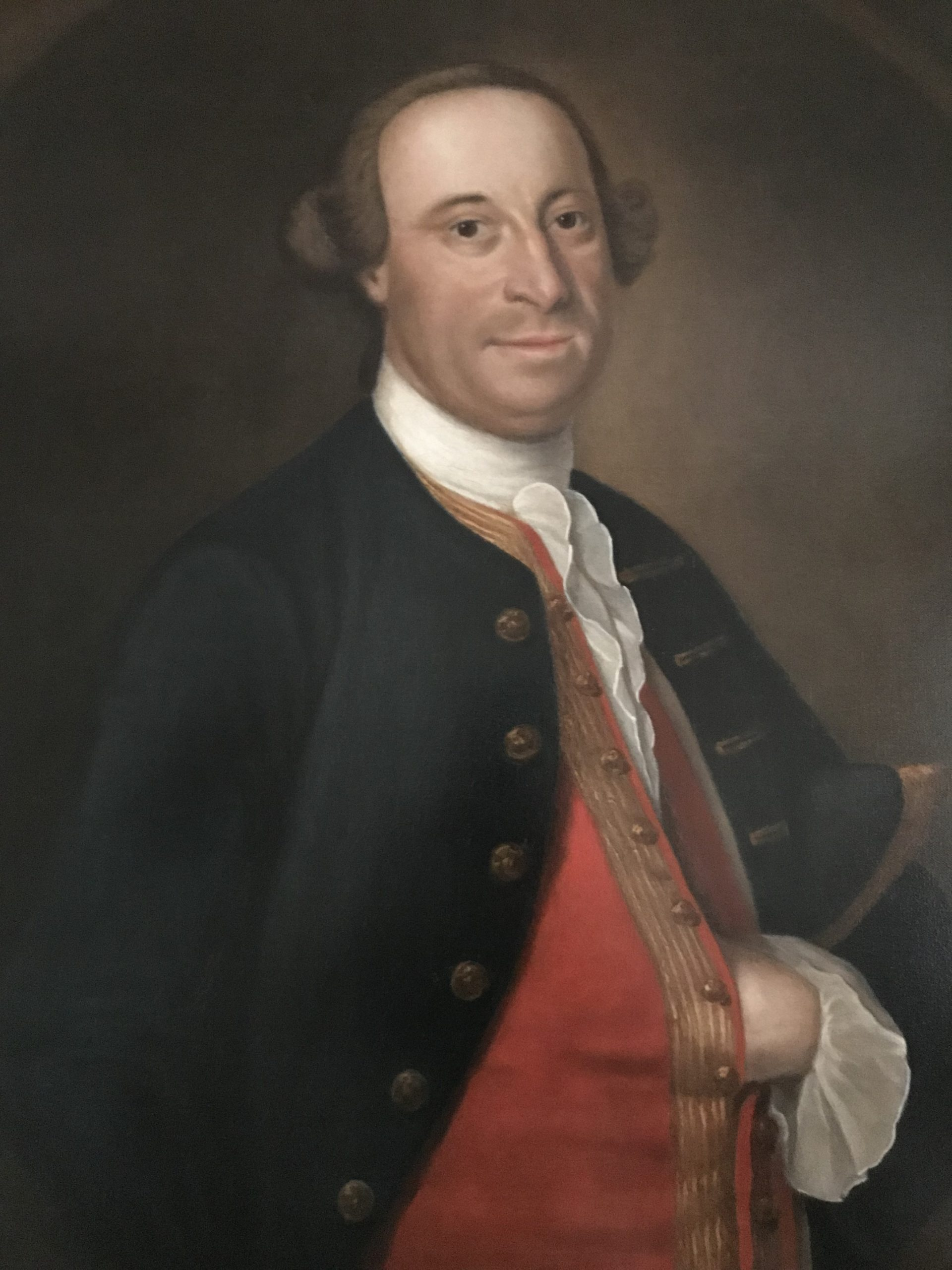
- Portrait by John Hesselius, 1765
- Born: 6 February 1720; Carlisle, Cumbria
- Died: October 1780 (aged 60)
- Buried: Alexandria, Virginia
- Children: 11

John Carlyle (6 February 1720 – October 1780) was a British-born American merchant and landowner who spent most of his life in the British colony of Virginia, where he became a leading social and political figure in Northern Virginia. Caryle was a founding trustee and the first overseer of Alexandria, Virginia.

== Early life ==
Born in Carlisle, Cumberland, England, Carlyle was the second surviving son of William Carlyle, an apothecary-surgeon, of a landed Scottish family from Dumfrieshire descended from the Lords Carlyle of Torthorwald and Rachel Murray of Murraythwaite, Dumfriesshire descendent of the Clan Murray, supporters of Robert the Bruce during First War of Scottish Independence.

== Merchant ==
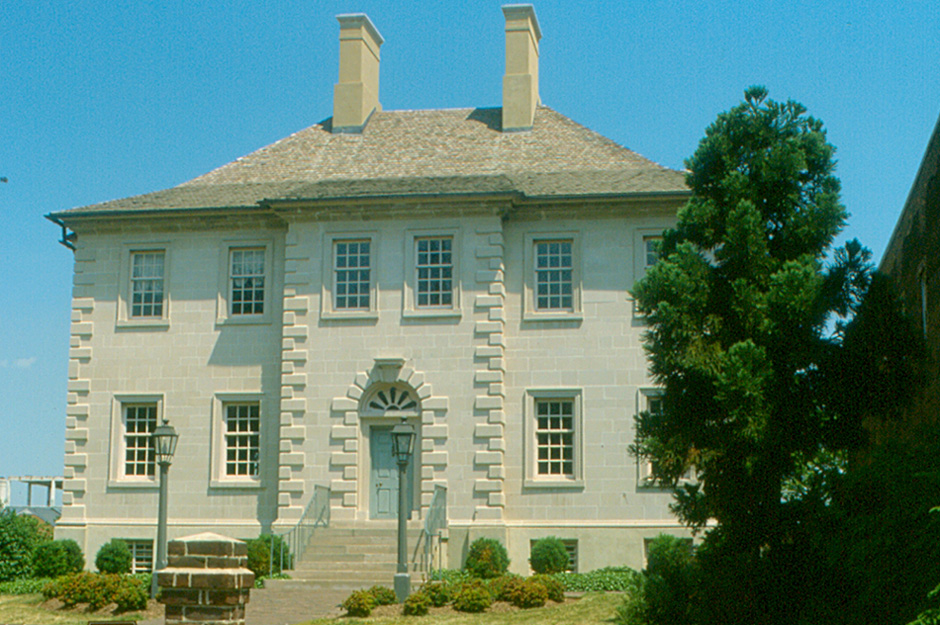
The Carlyle House built 1752.

In the 1730s, John Carlyle trained as an apprentice to English merchant William Hicks in the port town of Whitehaven. Hicks was a ship owner and traded with British colonies. It's during this apprenticeship that Carlyle learned to do business in the Virginia Trade. Hicks sent him as his factor (agent) in America to work in Virginia in 1741. Merchant agents were required to remain single since they had to travel extensively. He stopped working with Hicks and started his own ventures after his marriage with Sarah "Sally" Fairfax (see below).

Carlyle established himself as a merchant at Belhaven (original name of Alexandria), a settlement that had grown up around a tobacco warehouse on the bluff overlooking the Potomac River. Carlyle quickly met with financial success. The Hicks company did not allow their workers to get married, but that did not stop him, he married Sarah Fairfax in 1747 (she was cousin of Thomas Fairfax, one of the most influential families in Virginia).

He built his house between 1751 and 1753 in Alexandria, now called Carlyle House. He also owned thousands of acres of land throughout Virginia, including three plantations. His business ventures included trading with England and the West Indies, retail operations in Alexandria, a foundry in the Shenandoah Valley, milling, and operation of a forge. He also undertook a number of civic and religious positions typical of a man of his status. Carlyle was owner of 4 ships, 3 of them capable of crossing the Atlantic to sell his products to France and Great Britain. The city of Belhaven was renamed to Alexandria, Virginia in 1779.

== French and Indian War ==
On 26 January 1754, George Washington was appointed Colonel by Virginia's Lieutenant Governor Robert Dinwiddie, major and commissary of the Virginia forces in the French and Indian War. He was politically well-connected at the time and was friends with Colonel George Washington. John Carlyle was appointed colonel in 1755.

When the French and native forces were stronger, Great Britain sent General Edward Braddock to fight their enemies. In 1755, Carlyle's house was the initial headquarters for Major-General Edward Braddock in Virginia during the French and Indian War. The Congress of Alexandria convened at the house, most likely in the dining room, and here Braddock decided to make an expedition to the French Fort Duquesne.

Braddock was urged not to undertake the expedition by Washington whom was then a volunteer aide-de-camp to Braddock. The expedition consisted in 1,300 British troops, they fought against 300 native warriors and some French troops, Battle of the Monongahela resulted in the death of 456 British troops and 422 British injured, Braddock was severely injured and died after the battle, he was buried in a secret location in order to protect his grave.

== Morven ==
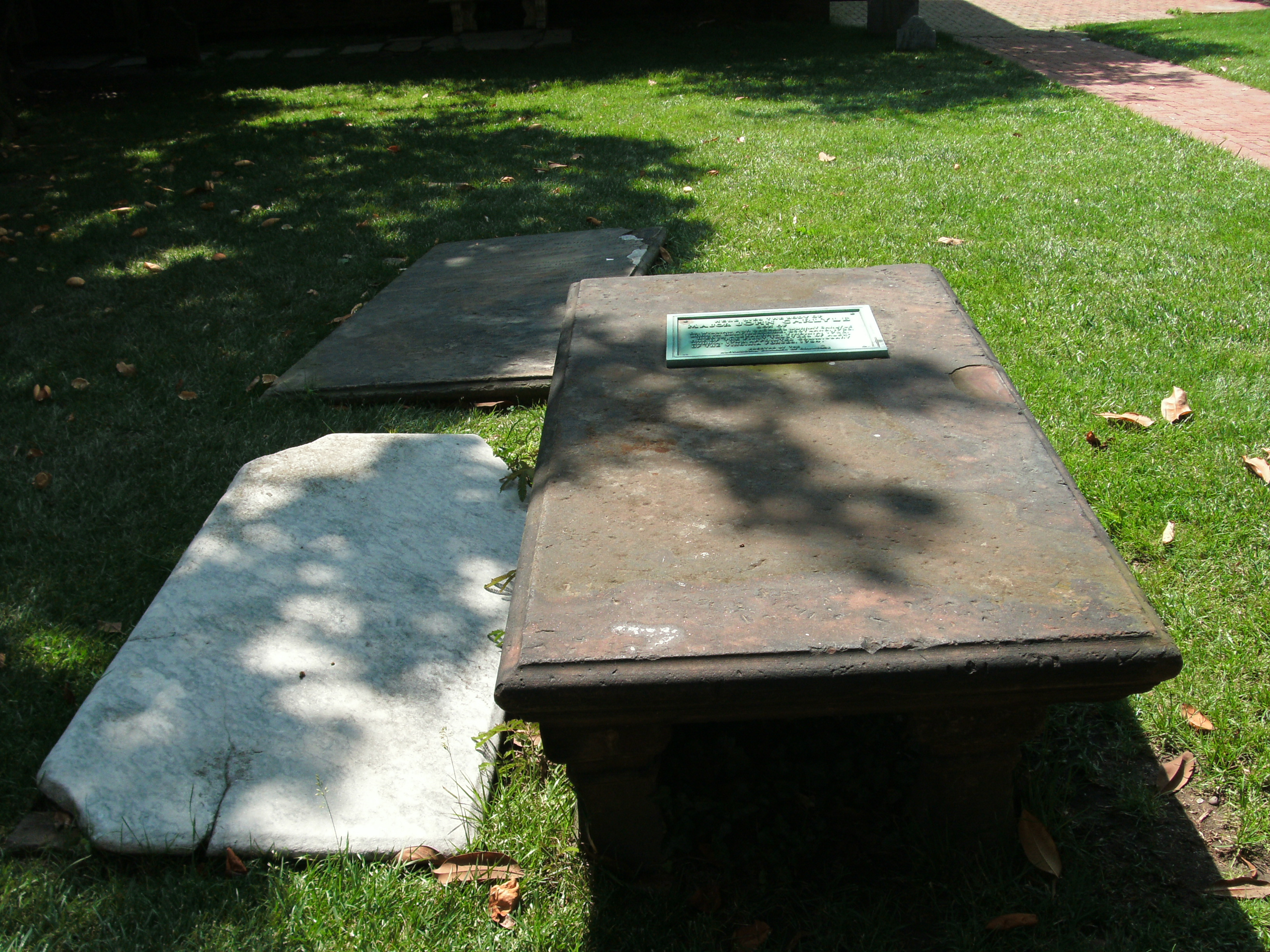
Tomb of John Carlyle

Around 1770, Caryle constructed a plantation house and summer residence in what is now Fairlington, Arlington, Virginia first called Torthorwald (after his family's ancestral home in Scotland) and later changed to Morven (a mythical land of the Gaels in an Ossian poem) which stood until 1942. He used this plantation as a stud farm and operated a grist mill on Four Mile Run above what is now Arlandria. Carlyle died in 1780 and is buried at the Old Presbyterian Meeting House in Alexandria.

== Family ==
In 1747, he married Sarah "Sally" Fairfax (daughter of William Fairfax who was cousin of Thomas Fairfax, who held large amounts of land in Virginia), with whom he had 7 children, among them Sarah Fairfax Carlyle who was born on January 4, 1757. Sarah Fairfax gave birth to another daughter, Ann on 21 January 1761. Sarah died the following day. Sally had gotten married when she was 17 years old, and Ann got married when she was 14 years old, but died three years later, in a birth related death.

John Carlyle married Sybil West (daughter of prominent Alexandrian Hugh West) with whom he had four more children. Among them was George William Carlyle, who was born on May 27, 1766. William Carlyle (John Carlyle's father) died in 1774. In 1779, while George William Carlyle was at school, he was informed of the illness of his father and returned to the house. After his father's death he volunteered for Virginian a regiment led by William Washington and decided to join the revolution. He died in 1781 at the Battle of Eutaw Springs.

=== Carlyle House ===
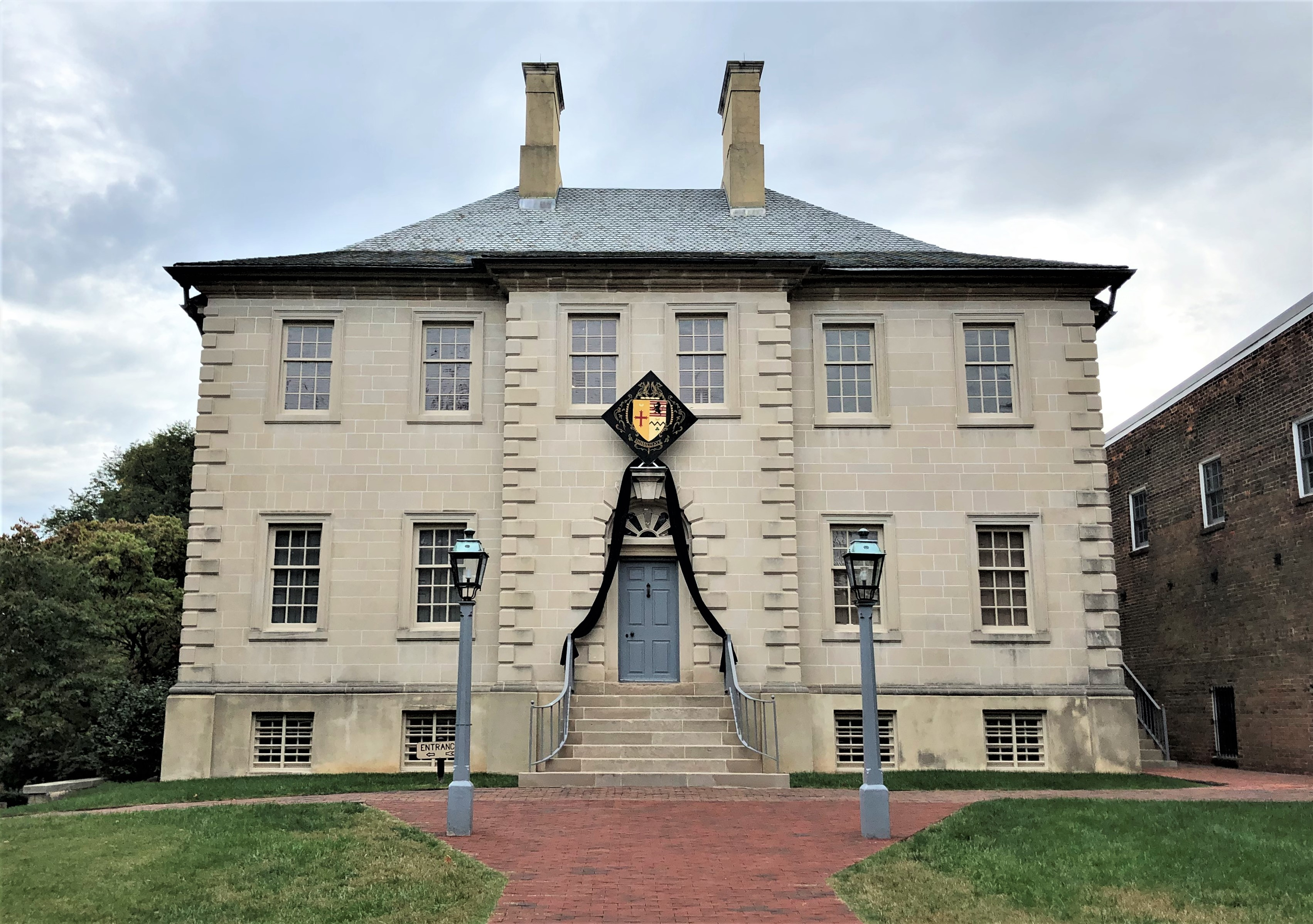
Carlyle House in 2021

In 1751 or 1752, John Carlyle completed the construction of his house, the Carlyle House. They moved to the house on August 7, 1753. It is situated in the city's Old Town at 121 North Fairfax Street between Cameron and King Streets.

=== Heir ===
John Carlyle's only son to survive beyond childhood was George William Carlyle, born in 1766. He served in the cavalry (3rd Continental Light Dragoons under Lt. Col. William Washington, a cousin of George Washington) and was killed in South Carolina in the American Revolutionary War Battle of Eutaw Springs on 8 September 1781 at age 15, less than one year after the death of his father. Had George William Carlyle lived, he would have been entitled to the dormant barony as Lord Carlyle, after the death of his first cousin Joseph Dacre Carlyle who died without a son in 1804.

== Slavery ==
Carlyle owned slaves and used them in his household and his multiple business ventures. As many other slave owners at this time, he had a paternalistic approach towards slaves, and considered them primarily as parts of his assets. He was also "active in importing, buying, selling and owning slaves", which was a common activity at that time.

== In the media ==
Paper & Stone: The hidden history of John Carlyle, is a 30 minutes documentary about the life, history and recent discoveries of John Carlyle family. It was produced in 2005 by Robert Cole films & The Carlyle House Historic Park.

== See also ==
- Lord Carlyle of Torthorwald
- Torthorwald Castle
- Carlyle House
- Torthorwald
