= Congress of Alexandria =

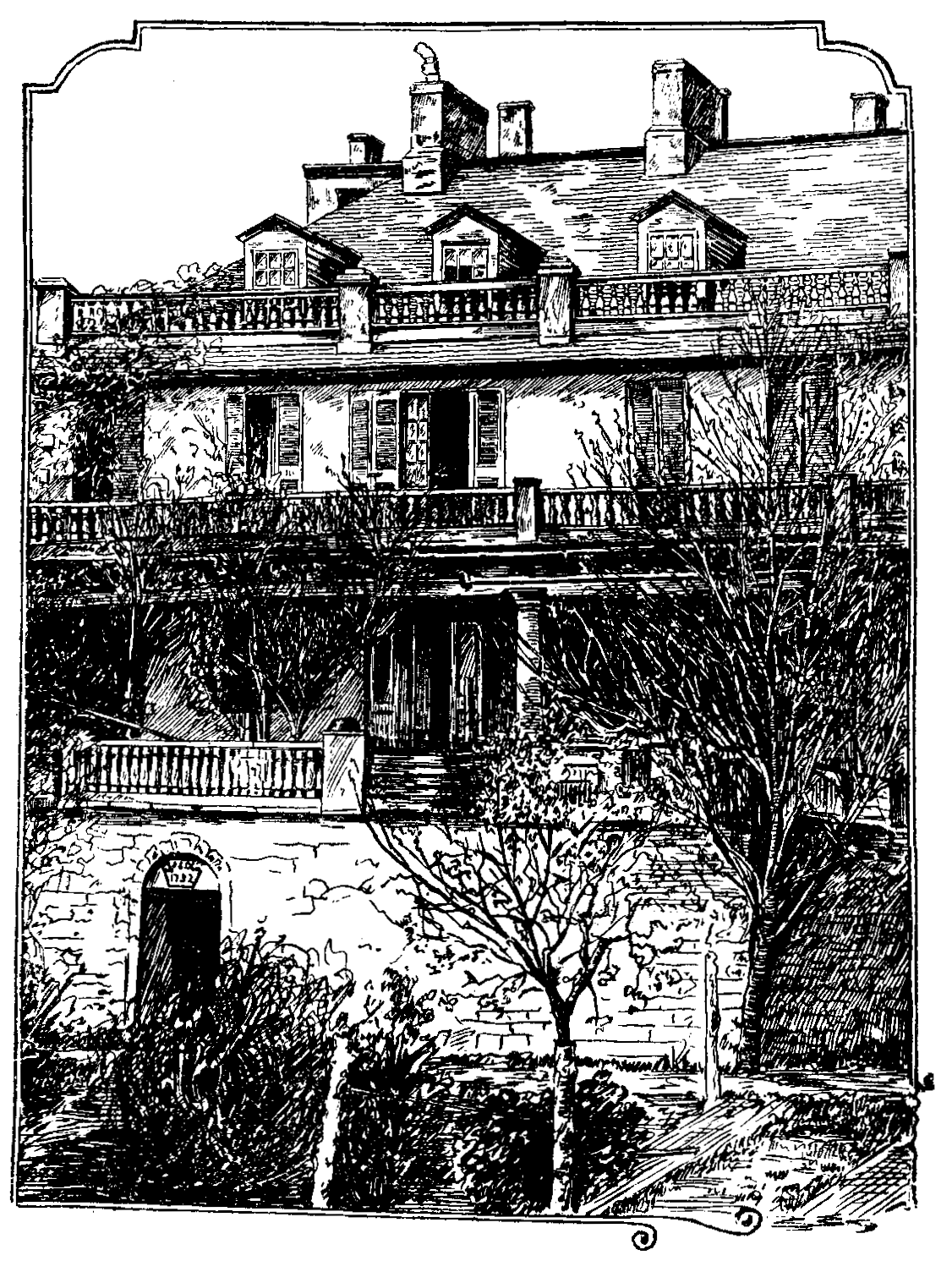
Illustration of the Carlyle House in 1752, three years before the meeting was held

The Congress of Alexandria (also known as the Council of Alexandria) was a 1755 meeting of Major-General Edward Braddock, commander-in-chief of the British Army in North America and governors of five of the constituent colonies. These were Robert Dinwiddie of Virginia, Horatio Sharpe of Maryland, Robert Hunter Morris of Pennsylvania, William Shirley of Massachusetts and James DeLancey of New York. The meeting was held on 15 April 1755 at Carlyle House in Alexandria, Virginia, home of one of that city's prominent figures, John Carlyle. It was an attempt by Braddock to raise funds for a war fund to fight the French in the coming French and Indian War. The governors rebuffed the request demanding prior funding from the Parliament of Great Britain. The Congress did, however, agree on a war plan for a four-pronged attack against New France.

Sir William Johnson of New York, who was also present at the meeting, was appointed Superintendent of Indian Affairs and commissioned a major-general. He was tasked with meeting with the Iroquois Confederacy to keep them neutral in the war. The Congress of Alexandria is sometimes noted as the beginning of intercolony dialogue and of the political tension between the colonies and Britain over issues of taxation. Ten years before the Stamp Act 1765, Braddock wrote from Carlyle House to the British politician Thomas Robinson that "I cannot but take the liberty to represent to you the necessity of laying a tax upon all his Majesty's dominions in America, agreeably to the result of Council, for reimbursing the great sums that must be advanced for the service and interest of the colonies in this important crisis." The meeting is reenacted every year at the Carlyle House.
