= Hannah James (actress) =

American actress

- Born: January 4, 1993 (age 33); Virginia, U.S.
- Citizenship: United States; United Kingdom
- Education: Guildford School of Acting
- Occupation: Actor

Hannah James is a British–American actress. She is most known for her role as Civil War belle, Emma Green, in the mini-series Mercy Street, set in James's home state of Virginia.

== Early life ==
James grew up on a rural farm in Madison County, Virginia, where she was home-schooled, until the age of ten. When she was two, she started taking dance lessons. While she studied ballet throughout her youth, James attended the Guildford School of Acting in Surrey, England.

== Career ==
James's first major role was a Civil War belle, who becomes a volunteer nurse, in the mini-series Mercy Street—set in Virginia. The character, Emma Green, was based on a historical figure. Many Virginia newspapers celebrated that the role of Virginian belle was played by a Virginian. Women's Wear Daily, noting that the series would be broadcast in the same time slot as Downton Abbey, suggested James was poised to be the next "Lady Mary". James's costumes required her to wear a corset, and she described how she almost fainted on one particularly long day on set.

On November 12, 2016, producers announced that James had been cast in a single episode role (3.4) for the third season of Outlander.

== Filmography ==
Year	Title	Role	Notes
2014	Winding Lane	Beth	Short film
2016-2017	Mercy Street	Emma Green	Main cast
2017	Outlander	Lady Geneva Dunsany	1 episode
2017	Esther	Cora	Short film; also producer
2019, 2021	Supergirl	Maeve Nal	2 episodes
2020	Let Them All Talk	Salon Receptionist	
2021	Chicago Med	Megan	1 episode
2022	Westworld	Temperance Clementine	1 episode
2023	Two Sinners and a Mule	Nora	
2024	Holly by Nightfall	Holly	Title role
2026	The Gray House	Clara Parish	Main cast
2026	Remain	Tessa	
