= Adventures of an Army Nurse in Two Wars =

1904 book by James Phinney Munroe

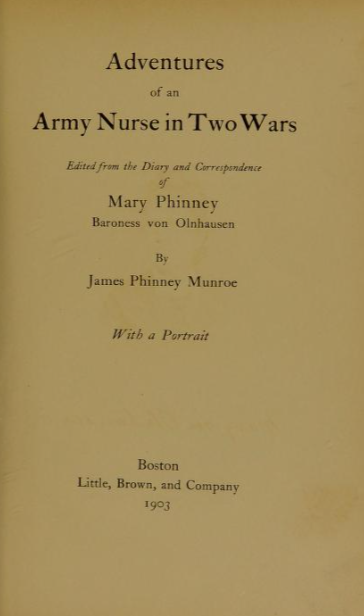
- Title page for Adventures of an Army Nurse in Two Wars (1903)
- Author: James Phinney Munroe
- Language: English
- Genre: History
- Publisher: Little, Brown & Company
- Publication date: February 2, 1904
- Publication place: United States
- Pages: 378

Adventures of an Army Nurse in Two Wars is a book based on the letters and diary entries of American Mary Phinney von Olnhausen (1818-1902), who worked as an army nurse in the American Civil War from 1861 to 1865 and the Franco-Prussian War in 1870.

The book was edited by her nephew, James Phinney Munroe, and published in 1904 by Little, Brown and Company, after Mary Phinney's death.

The first part of the book explores the lives of people who worked in the Mansion House Hospital in Alexandria, as well as Phinney's work at the Mansfield General Hospital at Morehead, North Carolina. The second part discusses her work as a nurse in 1870 in the Franco-Prussian War.

== Critical reception ==
In a review of the book for the American Journal of Nursing, M. E. Cameron wished Munroe had included more dates but was ultimately "deeply grateful for what he has given, and most particularly for allowing the letters and diary to convey their own impression and retain the individuality of the writer." A review in The Washington Star similarly noted that Munroe tried his best to maintain Phinney's viewpoint, concluding that the book "reflects vividly the scenes and incidents of two great wars as seen by the army nurse." A review for the Brooklyn Eagle felt that the significance of the book lay in the fact that it offered a woman's perspective of the wars, compared to the numerous books about the subject written by men. A review in the Detroit Free Press found the book to be a compelling account that provided a "graphic and deeply interesting" peek into the lives of army nurses.

== In popular culture ==
Mercy Street, a PBS fictional TV series related the life of nurses at Mansion House Hospital where Phinney was stationed. The lead character is based on and named after Phinney, and played by Mary Elizabeth Winstead. The series was canceled after two seasons.
