= Kirk Wolfinger =

American Director and Producer

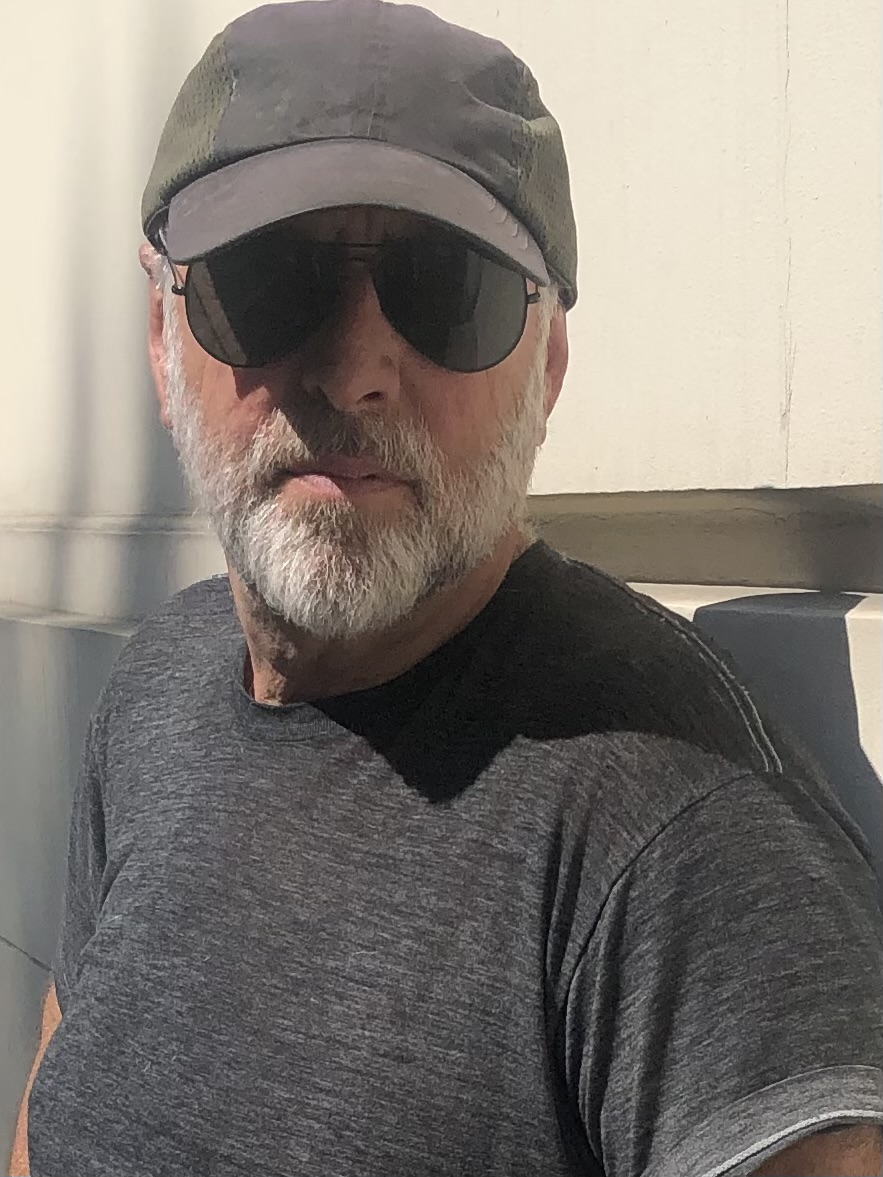
- Wolfinger in 2025
- Occupations: Filmmaker, producer, director
- Known for: Documentary, history, and science programming
- Title: President & co-founder of Lone Wolf Media
- Spouse: Lisa Quijano Wolfinger

Kirk Wolfinger is an American filmmaker, producer, and director known for his work in documentary, historical, and science programming. He is a recipient of multiple Emmy and Peabody Awards for his contributions to television. Wolfinger is the president and co-founder of Lone Wolf Media, an independent production company based in South Portland, Maine, which he operates with his wife, producer Lisa Quijano Wolfinger.

== Career ==
Wolfinger began his filmmaking career in the mid-1980s, producing his first documentary, Black Magic (1984).

Over the following decades, he directed and produced numerous programs for major broadcasters, including PBS's NOVA, National Geographic, The History Channel, and the Smithsonian Channel. His films often explore themes of scientific discovery, history, exploration, and human endurance.

In 1997, Wolfinger and his wife founded Lone Wolf Media, which has since produced award-winning programs distributed internationally. The company is recognized for long-running collaborations with public broadcasting networks and for its contributions to science and history-based storytelling.

=== Work ===
Wolfinger's career spans more than four decades in documentary filmmaking. He has directed and produced historical, scientific, and investigative programs for major U.S. and international broadcasters. His work include:

- Black Magic (1984), Winner of the America Film Festival Blue Ribbon 1984.
- Second Home (PBS, 1984), documenting life aboard the aircraft carrier USS John F. Kennedy.
- Submarine: Steel Boats, Iron Men (PBS, 1991), providing access to a U.S. Navy nuclear-powered submarine.
- Bioterror (PBS NOVA, 2002), based on the book Germs: Biological Weapons and America's Secret War by Judith Miller, Stephen Engelberg, and William Broad, produced with WGBH Boston.
- The Ravens: Covert War in Laos (Discovery Times Channel, 2003), examining the air war in Laos during the Vietnam conflict.
- Dirty Bomb (BBC/WGBH, 2003), a NOVA special on radiological terrorism.
- The Rivals (2009), an independent documentary on a Maine high school football rivalry that received Best Picture at the Phoenix Film Festival.
- 9/11 Inside the Pentagon (PBS, 2016), marking the 15th anniversary of the September 11 attacks and featuring accounts from Pentagon survivors.
- USS Indianapolis: Final Chapter (PBS, 2017), covering the discovery of the WWII shipwreck in partnership with Paul Allen's exploration team.
- Hindenburg: The New Evidence (PBS NOVA, 2021), reexamining the 1937 airship disaster using newly found footage.
- Resistance: They Fought Back (PBS, 2024), co-directed with Paula S. Apsell, focusing on Jewish resistance during the Holocaust. The documentary premiered at Jerusalem Jewish Film Week and aired nationally on PBS on International Holocaust Remembrance Day.

His more recent work includes Bermuda Triangle: Into Cursed Waters (History Channel), America's Hidden Stories (Smithsonian Channel), and Wild Crime (ABC/Hulu). Wolfinger has collaborated with scientists and explorers such as Robert Ballard and Nobel laureates Svante Pääbo and Saul Perlmutter on science-themed productions.

His work also includes an Emmy Award (Bioterror), a Peabody Award (Moon Shot), the Phoenix Film Festival Best Picture award (The Rivals), and six Emmy nominations for various films.

== Selected filmography ==
- Moon Shot (TNT, 1994) – winner of a George Foster Peabody Award.
- Failure Is Not an Option (2003)
- Titanic's Final Moments: Missing Pieces (2006).
- The Rivals (2009)
- Resistance: They Fought Back (2021)
- Holocaust Escape Tunnel (PBS Nova, 2017).
- USS Indianapolis: Final Chapter – documenting the discovery of the WWII shipwreck in collaboration with Paul Allen's team.
- Deep Sea Detectives (History Channel).
- America's Hidden Stories (Smithsonian Channel).
- Bermuda Triangle: Into Cursed Waters (2022–present).

== Awards and recognition ==
Wolfinger has received multiple awards for his work, including:

- Emmy Award for Bioterror (a Nova/New York Times co-production).
- George Foster Peabody Award for Moon Shot.
- Regional Emmy Awards and several Primetime Emmy nominations.
- The Rivals won Best Picture at the Phoenix Film Festival.
