= Mercy Street (TV series) =

American period medical drama

- Genre: Period medical drama
- Created by: Lisa Q. Wolfinger; David Zabel
- Composer: David Buckley
- Country of origin: United States
- Original language: English
- No. of seasons: 2
- No. of episodes: 12

Production
- Executive producers: Lisa Q. Wolfinger; Ridley Scott; David W. Zucker; David Zabel
- Producer: David A. Rosemont
- Production locations: Petersburg, Virginia; Richmond, Virginia
- Cinematography: Stephen St. John; Feliks Parnell
- Editors: Sue Blainey; Ted Feuerman
- Running time: 54 minutes
- Production companies: Lone Wolf Media; Remainder Men; Scott Free Productions

Original release
- Network: PBS
- Release: January 14, 2016 – March 5, 2017

Mercy Street is an American period medical drama television series created by Lisa Wolfinger and David Zabel. The series is based on the memoir, Adventures of an Army Nurse in Two Wars, by Mary Phinney von Olnhausen. It is set during the Civil War and follows two volunteer nurses from opposing sides who work at the Mansion House Hospital in Alexandria, Virginia. The first season of six episodes premiered on-demand on January 14, 2016 and made its broadcast debut on January 17, 2016 on PBS with 3.3 million viewers.

PBS announced in early March 2016 that Mercy Street had been renewed for a second season which premiered on January 22, 2017.

On March 9, 2017, PBS cancelled the series after two seasons.

== Cast and characters ==
=== Main ===
- McKinley Belcher III as Samuel Diggs
- Suzanne Bertish as Matron Brannan
- Norbert Leo Butz as Dr. Byron Hale
- L. Scott Caldwell as Belinda Gibson
- Gary Cole as James Green, Sr.
- Jack Falahee as Frank Stringfellow
- Peter Gerety as Dr. Alfred Summers
- Shalita Grant as Aurelia Johnson (season 1)
- Hannah James as Emma Green
- Brad Koed as James Green, Jr.
- Luke Macfarlane as Chaplain Henry Hopkins
- Patina Miller as Charlotte Jenkins (season 2)
- Cameron Monaghan as Tom Fairfax (season 1)
- Donna Murphy as Jane Green
- Brían F. O'Byrne as Allan Pinkerton (season 2)
- Bryce Pinkham as Major Clayton McBurney (season 2)
- Josh Radnor as Dr. Jed Foster
- AnnaSophia Robb as Alice Green
- Tara Summers as Anne Hastings
- Wade Williams as Silas Bullen
- Mary Elizabeth Winstead as Mary Phinney

=== Others ===
- Cherry Jones as Dorothea Dix
- Betty Gilpin as Eliza Foster
- Owen Teague as Otis
- Emily Marie Palmer as Sister Isabella
- Debra Monk as Dr. Foster's Mother
- Lyne Renée as Lisette Beaufort (season 2)
- William Mark McCullough as Larkin (season 2)
- Brannon Cross as Agent Cahill (season 2)
- Chris Wood as Capt. Lance Van Der berg (Season 2)

== Production ==
The series was created by Lisa Wolfinger and David Zabel and inspired by memoirs and letters of actual doctors and female nurse volunteers at Mansion House Hospital. The production consulted a number of experts, including James M. McPherson and Dr. Stanley Burns, for historical and medical accuracy. Dr. Burns' The Burns Archive has a collection of photographs of wounded soldiers and operations, which helped inspire the show.

The show was filmed in Richmond and Petersburg, Virginia, largely in the Petersburg Old Town Historic District. Between 250–300 extras were employed for each episode, pulled in equal parts from local theater around the Richmond region, and first timers alike.

== Episodes ==
=== Series overview ===
Season	Episodes	Originally released	
Season	Episodes	First released	Last released
1	6	January 14, 2016	February 21, 2016
2	6	January 22, 2017	March 5, 2017

=== Season 1 (2016) ===
No. overall	No. in season	Title	Directed by	Written by	Original release date
1	1	"The New Nurse"	Roxann Dawson	Story by : Lisa Q. Wolfinger & David Zabel; Teleplay by : David Zabel	January 14, 2016 (on-demand); January 17, 2016 (broadcast)
New England widow Mary is sent as the new head nurse to an Alexandria hotel owned by the Southern Green family which is repurposed as a Union military hospital, much to their dislike. Doctors Hale and Foster disagree on the use of modern medicine and whether to treat Confederate wounded soldiers with the same attention as Union. The Green family's oldest daughter, Emma sneaks into the hospital to acquire news about her "beau" Frank Stringfellow and finds her little sister Alice's beau, Tom Fairfax instead. Free man Samuel Diggs secretly performs an emergency surgery that's covered up by Mary.
2	2	"The Haversack"	Roxann Dawson	David Zabel	January 24, 2016
Samuel is smitten with Aurelia Johnson, a contraband slave, but she is abused by the despotic hospital steward Silas Bullen, who "promises" to find her family for his own sexual needs. He also gets into an argument with Mary about the treatment of the patients. Emma is accepted as a volunteer nurse, and her little sister Alice learns that her beau Tom is a patient, yet in a desolate psychological state. Anne, once the most efficient nurse, feels threatened in her position by Mary and resorts to drinking. She plots against Mary with her lover Dr. Hale. Confederate slave hunters search for contraband slaves even though they are free in Alexandria, and Jimmy convinces his father to turn a blind eye on them to avoid trouble.
3	3	"The Uniform"	Roxann Dawson	Alex Metcalf	January 31, 2016
Jed passes his military medical exam and he is quickly put to the test when he has to treat his wounded brother who's a Confederate soldier. Mary discovers his morphine addiction and wants to help him through withdrawal. As Silas is not providing enough meals for the patients, Mary decides to start cooking the meals herself. Aurelia gets pregnant from Silas. Tom is still suffering and working with Henry. Frank arrives posing as a dentist assistant, while he is stealing military plans from the Union soldiers. Meanwhile, the Union demands an oath of allegiance from the Greens, but James decides against it.
4	4	"The Belle Alliance"	Jeremy Webb	Jason Richman	February 7, 2016
While Jed is going through withdrawal, Mary keeps him hidden from the others under the pretense that he is sick and contagious. The Greens are throwing a lavish Southern-style dinner party for the Union officers and James asks for some months more time to sign the oath of allegiance to the North. Frank breaks Tom out of the hospital during the party so he can join the Confederate troops again, but Tom cannot go back and is haunted by war, so he commits suicide. Meanwhile, Aurelia has seriously injured herself while performing her own abortion, and Mary calls Jed for help. He saves her with Samuel's assistance, and even though this procedure will cause her never to have children, she reveals that she already has a child, a son named Gabriel.
5	5	"The Dead Room"	Jeremy Webb	Rob Hanning	February 14, 2016
The medical inspector visits the hospital and decides to make Jed chief surgeon despite not wanting the job when Alfred is promoted. Tom's body is found and the Greens want a proper burial, and a funeral is held. However, in order to be allowed to bury him in the cemetery, James Sr. lies to the union officer about the oath of allegiance, and is later arrested. Aurelia tells Samuel that she is working for Silas because he promised to send her son to safety, but Samuel does not believe it. When three Union soldiers arrive and demand to know who took the provisions that were sent for their wounded brother, Silas tells them it was Samuel, while in reality it was Silas himself who kept them. Jed has to save Samuel from being lynched and Samuel has to leave town. Frank meets with John Wilkes Booth in Washington City. He returns and plots for an attack on President Lincoln when he visits the hospital.
6	6	"The Diabolical Plot"	Jeremy Webb	Jason Richman & David Zabel	February 21, 2016
Jed wants to get rid of Silas, and also faces a strong opposition from Byron. When he orders Byron to follow medical scientific treatment standards instead of making patients suffer, Silas helps Byron to get rid of the needed chloroform used as anesthetics. James Sr. is still detained by the Union administration, and plans to wait for the Confederates to retake Alexandria. Jimmy plots to smuggle supplies to the Confederate troops, and Alice joins the Knights of the Golden Circle. However, when James Sr. is about to be transferred to the capitol prison, Jimmy officially signs the oath of allegiance. Frank helps to fill the basement of the hospital with explosives, and Silas becomes a casualty in their cause. However, when Frank sees Emma attending President Lincoln's visit despite his expressed instructions not to, he aborts the bombing to save her. Aurelia recovers and leaves the hospital to go to the North, but her trip is interrupted when she happily reunites with Samuel, who has brought her mother and seven-year-old son Gabriel.

=== Season 2 (2017) ===
No. overall	No. in season	Title	Directed by	Written by	Original release date
7	1	"Balm in Gilead"	Stephen Cragg	David Zabel	January 22, 2017
With the assassination attempt failed and Detective Allan Pinkerton hot on his trail, Frank hides out in the Greens' basement. As Silas recuperates, Frank slashes the steward's throat, and Jed and Byron use a blood transfusion to save his life. Upon regaining consciousness, Silas identifies Frank as his attacker. Emma discovers Frank's deception and angrily throws him out, and her determination to continue working as a nurse, even for Union soldiers, is strengthened. Jed and Mary's blossoming romance sours with the arrival of Charlotte Jenkins, an outspoken abolitionist sent to help stem a smallpox epidemic among the contraband population. Realizing that Jed's prejudices kept him from even noticing this epidemic, Mary curtly ends the relationship. James is released from jail due to Emma's intervention on his behalf to Lincoln, and is infuriated when he learns that Jimmy signed the loyalty oath in his stead. A contraband named Caleb shows up in Alexandria claiming to be Aurelia's husband and father of her 7-year-old child and son Gabriel. Samuel, wanting Aurelia for himself, denies that he ever knew her. Mary takes ill, developing symptoms of typhoid fever.
8	2	"The House Guest"	Stephen Cragg	Walon Green	January 29, 2017
The new hospital chief, the rigid and no-nonsense Major Clayton McBurney, arrives and ingratiates himself with Nurse Hastings, while chiding Jed for not following rules and insisting that Byron take a medical exam. Charlotte confronts Samuel about his lie, and Samuel realizes the steamer ticket he purchased for himself could help reunite Caleb with Aurelia. As a quack doctor patrols the hospital "treating" patients with "electromagnetism," Mary's typhoid worsens and, after fainting during her meeting with McBurney, she is bedridden. Jed, over McBurney's and Nurse Hastings' objections, devotes himself to caring for her and promises not to have her quarantined. Jimmy is now running the Green family business while James, having not signed the loyalty oath, is demoted to silent partner. Alice seduces a Union soldier in the hope of obtaining passwords and documents needed to help Frank escape Alexandria. When the soldier catches Alice rifling through his belongings, he attacks her, and is then killed by James and Jimmy. McBurney orders that Mary be quarantined, which Nurse Hastings happily enforces.
9	3	"One Equal Temper"	Laura Innes	Walon Green	February 5, 2017
James and Jimmy bury the murdered Union soldier in their furniture warehouse. Pinkerton questions them about Frank and the missing soldier, and discovers evidence of the family's involvement while searching the house. Alice and Frank successfully exit Alexandria and seek shelter at the home of a young Quaker couple, who recognize Frank as the man in the "Wanted" poster. Nevertheless, Frank decides not to murder them and confesses to Alice that he is tired of killing and has doubts about the Confederate cause. Back at Mansion House, Byron watches as Samuel treats a smallpox victim with a gashed leg and, impressed with his medical prowess, asks Samuel to tutor him for the upcoming exam. Emma and Chaplain Hopkins care for a dying Confederate veteran, who insists on having a Confederate minister give his eulogy. The minister's pro-slavery and anti-Union sermon enrages Hopkins, who angrily interrupts. Emma takes Hopkins' side, causing her mother to remark that Emma's zeal for the Confederacy is slipping away. A French anatomical artist, Lisette Beaufort, arrives and befriends Mary, whose typhoid has worsened. McBurney orders that Mary be sent away to recuperate and dispatches Jed and Nurse Hastings on a field visit so that Jed cannot interfere. Struck by Jed's love for Mary, Hastings confesses the real reason for the trip, and Jed arrives back just in time to bid Mary farewell.
10	4	"Southern Mercy"	Laura Innes	Jason Richman	February 12, 2017
A Union private named Ames arrives at Mansion House fresh from the Second Battle of Bull Run seeking help for his sick companion. Chaplain Hopkins wants to do more for the war effort, and he and Emma head out for the battlefield to rescue wounded soldiers. As the two share a kiss, they are attacked, and Hopkins fights with and drowns their attacker. Jane witnesses Emma aiding the wounded Union soldiers, confirming her suspicions. Jed is startled to meet Lisette, as the two turn out to have a stormy past. Jed suspects Ames and his companion of being gay lovers and tries to expel Ames from the hospital, but Lisette discovers the truth - Ames is a woman in disguise. As Charlotte teaches at a new school for contraband ex-slaves, Samuel helps Byron prepare for the medical exam by conducting an autopsy, and the two happen upon a startling medical discovery. Matron Brennan's son arrives at Mansion House seeking a medical deferment from combat, and after his mother refuses, turns to Nurse Hastings. As James proposes a "cotton diplomacy" plan to Confederate officials, Jimmy's plans to smuggle European weapons to the battle lines are discovered by two of his black employees. Pressured to kill them, Jimmy can't bring himself to do it and instead lets them flee, telling them to go north. While spying, Alice obtains a list of traitors to the Southern cause, which includes her own brother's name.
11	5	"Unknown Soldier"	Alex Zakrzewski	Jason Richman	February 19, 2017
A badly wounded, unidentified man, believed to be a soldier from the Battle of Chantilly, is cared for at Mansion House. Byron's deception regarding his credit of Samuel as a doctor on the autopsy is revealed, but Jed takes the blame for it in a plan to get Samuel into medical school. McBurney's tyranny reaches new levels as he closes Charlotte's school, berates Anne for the death of a patient, and orders Byron (who has passed his exam) transferred to California, and Anne and Byron join forces to oust him. Matron Brennan is notified that her son was killed while trying to desert. Hopkins, ashamed at having broken his vow to God, remains cold and distant with Emma. The Green family begins to unravel under the weight of Pinkerton's investigation and numerous secrets that are brought to light in a tense moment in the Green household, and Emma decides to leave home and board at Mansion House permanently. Jed and Lisette's relationship almost rekindles, but Lisette decides to move on and tells Jed to be good to Mary, the woman he loves. The "unknown soldier" turns out to not be a soldier at all, but rather a Quaker injured while bringing water to wounded soldiers.
12	6	"House of Bondage"	Alex Zakrzewski	David Zabel	March 5, 2017
A Union victory at Antietam (Sharpsburg) convinces President Lincoln to issue an Emancipation Proclamation, and James' cotton diplomacy plan falls apart, as the British no longer want an alliance with the slave-holding Confederacy. Jane learns of Alice's membership in the Knights of the Golden Circle and disapproves. With Pinkerton's investigation closing in, James decides to torch the family warehouse where the murdered Union soldier is buried. Back at Mansion House, Matron Brennan joins Byron's and Anne's plot to destroy McBurney. Belinda is reunited with her long-lost beau, George, and Emma, hoping to bring Hopkins out of his despair, asks him to marry the couple. Jed, accompanied by Samuel, visits his Confederate-sympathizer family to deliver a prosthetic leg to his brother, and clashes with his mother and brother over the morality and future of slavery, especially after learning that his brother fathered a child with one of the family's slaves through rape. An emboldened Samuel departs for medical school in Philadelphia, and Jed heads to Boston, where he is reunited with a gravely ill Mary and vows to continue to care for her.

== Critical reception ==
The series has received generally positive reviews from critics. On review aggregator Metacritic, it has a score of 61/100, indicating "generally favorable reviews", based on 19 critics. On Rotten Tomatoes, it has an approval rating of 75% based on 20 reviews, with an average rating of 6.7/10, stating "Mercy Street's intriguing setting and talented cast can't compensate for the overall lack of excitement in a period drama that's traditional to a fault".

== See also ==
- Adventures of an Army Nurse in Two Wars (book)
- Mary Phinney von Olnhausen
