= Frederic Lansing Day =

American dramatist (1890–1981)

- Born: September 28, 1890; Newtown, Massachusetts, U.S.
- Died: November 22, 1981 (aged 91); Princeton, New Jersey, U.S.
- Education: Yale University; Harvard University
- Occupations: Playwright; reporter
- Spouse(s): Katharine Langdon Munroe (m. 1915; div. 1938) Frances Palfrey Bangor
- Children: 3

Frederic Lansing Day (September 28, 1890 – November 22, 1981) was an American playwright.

== Early life ==
Frederic Lansing Day was born on September 28, 1890, in Newtown, Massachusetts, to Henry Brown Day, founder of the Day Trust Company. He graduated from Yale University in 1912. He did post graduate work at Harvard University. He was a member of Alpha Delta Phi.

== Career ==
From 1913 to 1914, Day was a reporter at the Boston Herald. He then served as an ensign in the United States Navy during World War I. He was a member of the U.S. Power Squadron. He also worked as an employee in his father's bank. Day was a Socialist and Unitarian.

Day wrote 17 plays, including an adaption of Edgar Allan Poe's The Fall of the House of Usher, Temple is a Town, Light Beyond the Shadows and Tattered Tom. He also published The Makers of Light: A Play in Three Parts (1925) originally produced by The 47 Workshop of Harvard and published by Brentano's, The Slump (1920), also produced by The 47 Workshop, Heaven is Deep.

=== Makers of Light ===
Makers of Light is a drama copyrighted by Day in 1920 and published in 1925. It was first shown at the Agassiz House Theater in Cambridge Nov. 25, 1921. The cast consisted of F.C. Packard, Jr., Angela Morris, Edith Coburn Noyes, Dorothy Sands, Oviatt McConnell, Henry Carlton, James Daly, F.L. Strong, Norman Clark, E.P. Goodnow and Robert Bushnell. It opened at the Neighborhood Playhouse of New York City, the Little Theater of Cleveland and the Play House of Cleveland.

"Makers of Light, when originally produced by the 47 Workshop made so deep an impression that later it was played at the Neighborhood Playhouse, New York City. Here it was again praised for its sincerity, subtle characterization of the chief figures and its power. Given at the Little Theater, Clevland, in the winter of 1924, it was revived the following autumn." -Professor George P. Barker

The dedication to the Makers of Light reads, "To my father; For his affection in spite of disapproval, his loyalty in spite of disbelief."

== Personal life ==
Day married Katharine Langdon Munroe, daughter of James Phinney Munroe, of Boston on January 9, 1915. They divorced in 1938. They had a home built in Cambridge, Massachusetts in 1920. He married Frances Palfrey Bangor. He had two sons and a daughter, Frederic II, Gordon and Elizabeth. He lived in Princeton, New Jersey, for 17 years.

Day died on November 22, 1981, at Princeton Medical Center.
