= Benjamin Franklin Stringfellow (1840–1913) =

Confederate army officer and spy

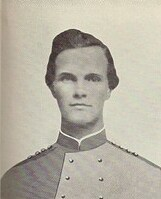
- Captain Benjamin Franklin Stringfellow
- Born: c. 1840
- Died: June 8, 1913 (aged 72); Lindsay, Virginia, U.S.
- Resting place: Ivy Hill Cemetery
- Education: Virginia Theological Seminary
- Spouse: Emma Green

Frank Stringfellow (c. 1840 – June 8, 1913) was a Confederate officer and spy who survived the American Civil War, and married the sweetheart for whom he repeatedly risked his life to court – Emma Green. After the war Stringfellow married Green, and became an Episcopal minister.

Shortly after joining the Confederate Army, Stringfellow became the "personal scout" for Confederate General J.E.B. Stuart. He crossed into Union territory on multiple missions, until the Union placed a $10,000 reward for his capture.

== Early life ==
He studied at the Episcopal High School and the Virginia Theological Seminary, both in Alexandria, Virginia.

== American Civil War ==
When war broke out, Stringfellow sought a commission in the Confederate Army. Despite four denials due to his fragile health (and 94 pound weight), Stringfellow eventually secured a commission as Captain in the 4th Virginia Cavalry (his brothers also served the Confederacy, although his cousins Pleasant and Robert Stringfellow served in the U.S. Army).

On September 4, 1862 he led 20 soldiers in a raid in an attempt to capture Union General Joseph Bartlett, whose headquarters were in the front yard of the home of Julia Sanford, a farmer and Union sympathizer in New Baltimore, Virginia. They fired a number of rounds at the Union troops and into the home but were unsuccessful. Stringfellow rode with General J.E.B. Stuart at Seven Pines, Cold Harbor, and the raid at Catlett's Station. Stringfellow also rode with Colonel John Singleton Mosby of the 43rd Virginia Cavalry, most notably in the raid at Loudoun Heights on January 9, 1864.

However, Stringfellow's fame derived from his confidential service, sometimes directly for General Robert E. Lee, but much through J.E.B. Stuart until his death in March 1864. By the end of the war, Stringfellow was known as the most dangerous man in the Confederacy, with a $10,000 bounty placed on his head. Stringfellow posed as a dental assistant in Alexandria, Virginia and gathered intelligence, and later even obtained a dental license and did the same in Washington, D.C. Unlike the plot line of the PBS drama Mercy Street, there is no evidence that Stringfellow was involved in any attempt on the life of President Abraham Lincoln.

== Postwar ==
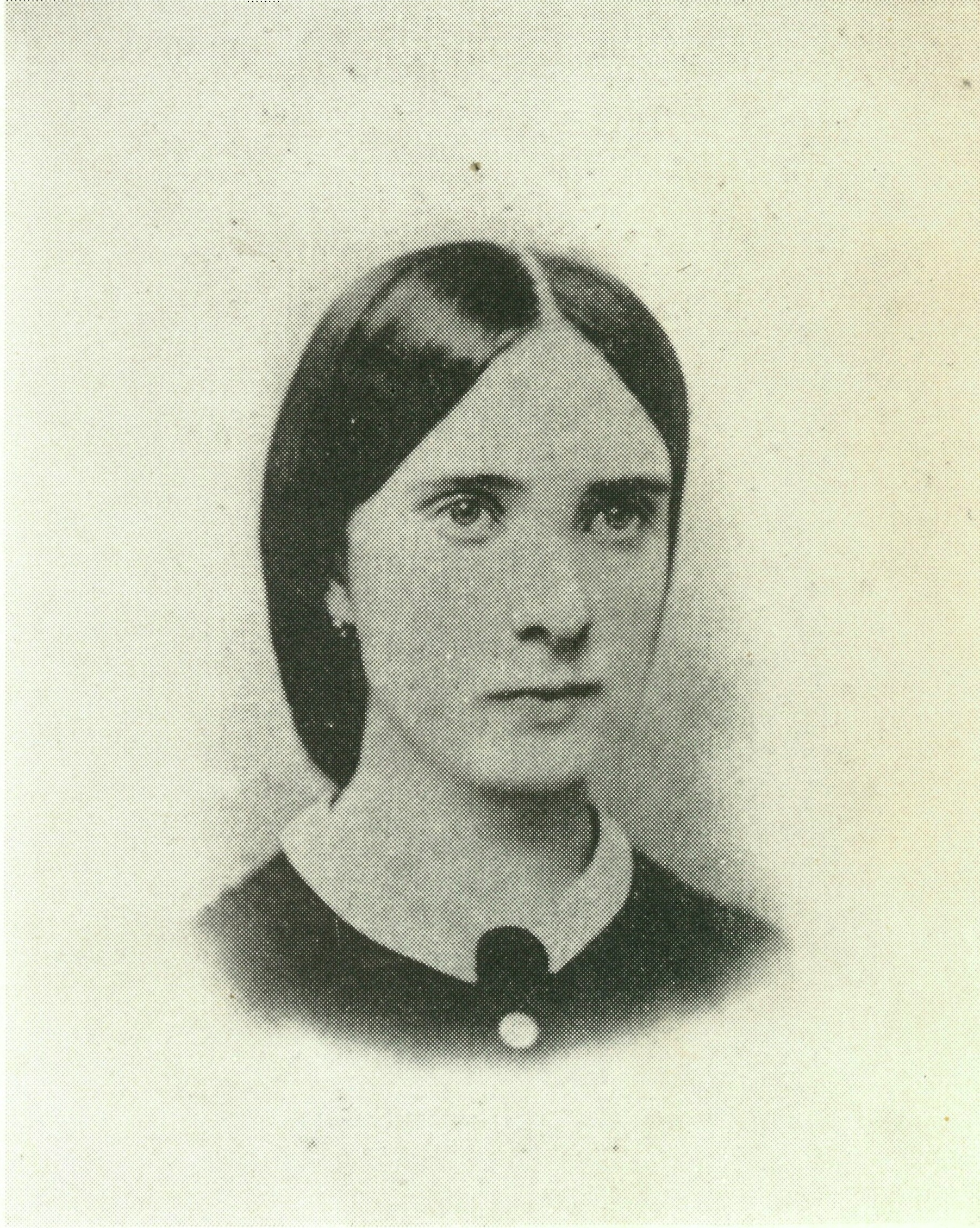
Stringfellow would risk his life to visit, and court, Emma Green, who lived in Alexandria, Virginia, under Union occupation.

Stringfellow refused to take the loyalty oath after the war and moved to Canada. He returned to Alexandria, Virginia in 1867, enrolling at what became the Virginia Theological Seminary and marrying his high school sweetheart, Emma Green with whom he had four children: Ida (born 1867), Alice Lee (born 1871), Frank (born 1881) and John Stanton (born 1883).

After graduating, from Virginia Theological Seminary, he was ordained an Episcopal priest in 1876. Rev. Stringfellow served in various parishes in Virginia, including in Franklin, Patrick, and Henry Counties. As rector, Rev. Stringfellow led the campaign that built Christ Episcopal Church in Martinsville in the 1890s, but moved on soon after the building was finished. At age 57, Rev. Stringfellow enlisted as a chaplain in the U.S. Army, after obtaining a reference from former President Grant, who noted Stringfellow had refrained from shooting him years earlier. During the Spanish–American War in 1898, Stringfellow served as a minister for the camps. He considered ministry among fellow Confederate veterans as his mission, and often regaled audiences with stories about his military escapades. He also became the first chaplain of the Woodberry Forest School, a male boarding school in Madison, Virginia, which had been established by a fellow Mosby Ranger in 1889.

During his postwar years, Stringfellow maintained contact with his Civil War acquaintances. Notably, he continued correspondence with Jefferson Davis regarding the nature of the Confederate government during the war years.

Stringfellow ultimately retired to Alexandria. He died in Lindsay, Virginia on June 8, 1913, and is buried beside his wife Emma at Ivy Hill Cemetery in Alexandria, Virginia.

== Mercy Street ==
Stringfellow was one of the characters in a PBS historical drama entitled Mercy Street and was played by Jack Falahee.

== See also ==
- Mary Phinney
- Emma Green
