= Mary Phinney von Olnhausen =

American nurse, abolitionist, and diarist

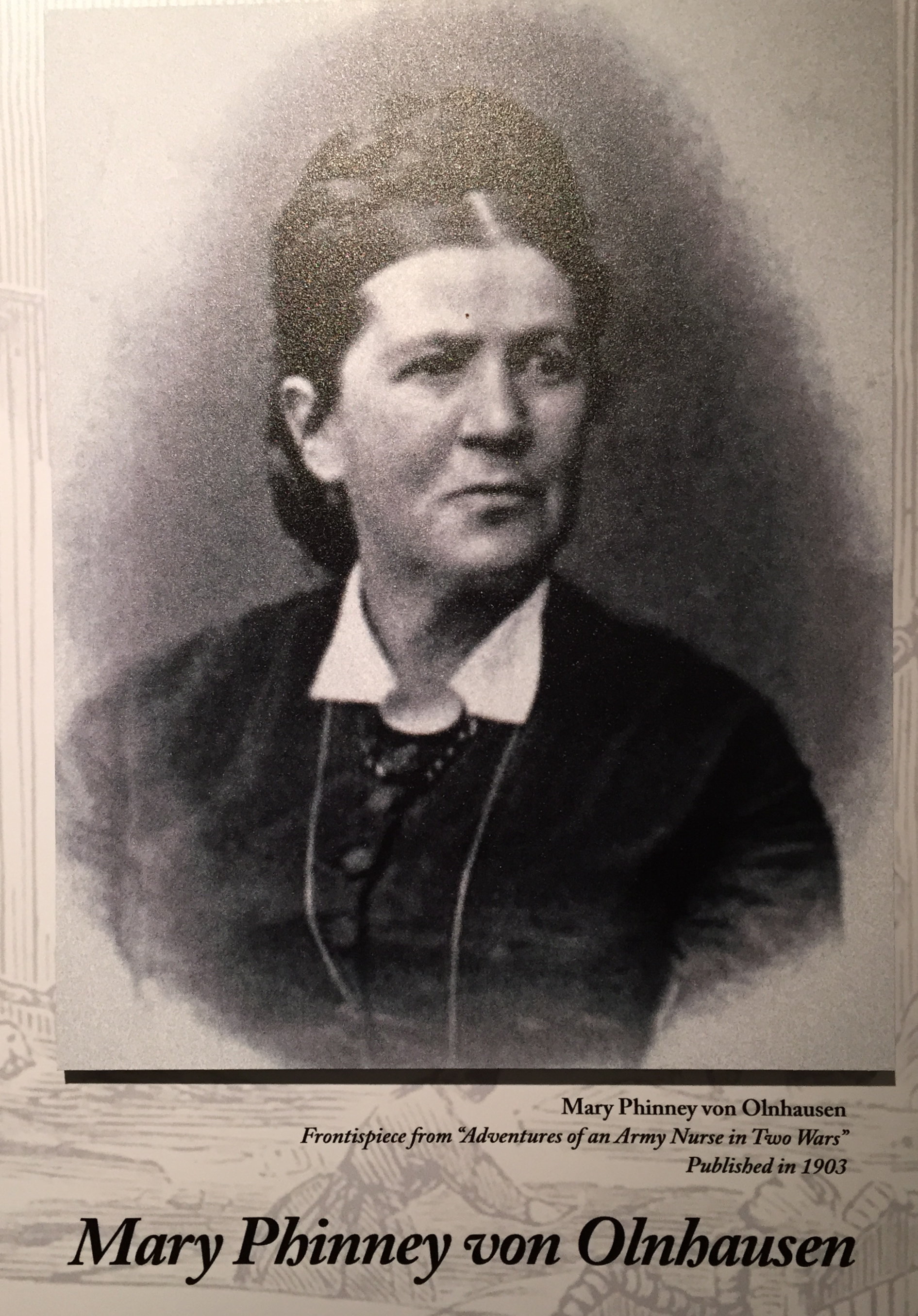
- Image of Phinney from the frontispiece of her posthumously published diaries. Phinney was in her mid to late forties during the Civil War.
- Born: 1818; Lexington, Massachusetts, U.S.
- Died: April 1902 (aged 83–84); Boston, Massachusetts, U.S.
- Occupation: Nurse
- Known for: Diarist who recorded 19th Century medical techniques
- Spouse: Baron Gustav Adolph von Olnhausen
- Parent(s): Elias and Catherine Bartlett Phinney

Baroness Mary Phinney von Olnhausen (1818–1902) was an American nurse, abolitionist, and diarist. Historians look to the book extracted from her diaries Adventures of an Army Nurse in Two Wars, edited by her nephew James Phinney Munroe, to understand the medical techniques of the Civil War.

== Early life and family ==
She was born in Lexington, Massachusetts to Elias, a lawyer, and Catherine Bartlett Phinney, the daughter of a doctor. Phinney was well educated at several academies.

When her father died in 1849 at age 69, the farm was sold and she "sought employment as a designer of print goods" at the Manchester Mills company in Massachusetts.

Baron Gustav Adolph von Olnhausen (born in 1809) left Saxony after the German revolutions of 1848–1849 and also due to financial troubles, which led him to sell of his property. In the 1850s he was making a meager living as a chemist in a dye-house of the Manchester Mills, where he met Mary Phinney.

They married on May 1, 1858 (she was 40 years old at the time) and he died two years later in 1860.

== American Civil War ==
During the American Civil War, von Olnhausen served as the head nurse at the Mansion House Hospital in Alexandria, Virginia and Mansfield General Hospital at Morehead, North Carolina. After the war, she was discharged in August 1865, returning home to help raise her brother's children in Illinois.

== Franco-Prussian War ==
With the outbreak of the Franco-Prussian War in 1870, she volunteered to serve as a nurse with the Prussian Army and was accepted on the basis of being the Baroness von Olnhausen. She served in field hospitals in Meung and Vendome.

== Awards ==
Phinney was awarded a Cross of Merit for Women and Girls in 1873 by Kaiser Wilhelm I, which is similar to an Iron Cross. She died in Boston in April, 1902.

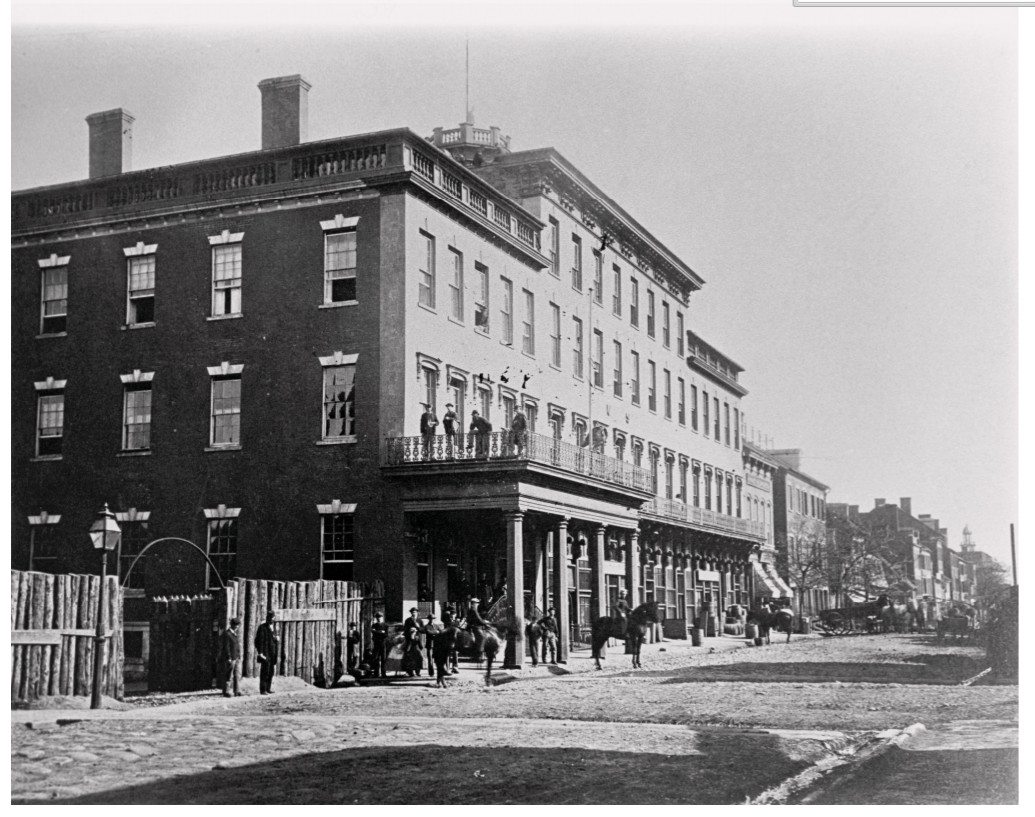
Mary Phinney von Olnhausen was the head nurse at the Mansion House Hospital during the occupation of Alexandria, Virginia.

== In popular culture ==
The book Adventures of an Army Nurse in Two Wars was edited in 1903 by James Phinney Munroe and published in 1904, after Mary had died. It is based on the diaries and correspondence of Mary Phinney von Olnhausen. The first part of the book talks about the lives of the people that worked in the Mansion House Hospital in Alexandria as well as her work at the Mansfield General Hospital at Morehead, North Carolina. The second part discusses her work as a nurse again in 1870 in the Franco-Prussian War.

In 2015, the PBS Masterpiece Theatre produced Mercy Street, a fictional mini series portraying life in the Mansion House Hospital where Phinney was stationed. The show relied heavily on her diaries and portrays Phinney as the lead character, played by Mary Elizabeth Winstead.
