= James Phinney Munroe =

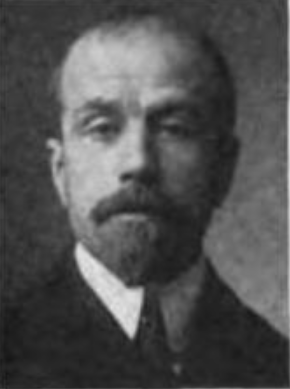
- Born: June 3, 1862; Lexington, Massachusetts
- Died: February 2, 1929 (aged 66); Boston, Massachusetts
- Education: Massachusetts Institute of Technology
- Occupations: Writer, businessman

James Phinney Munroe (June 3, 1862 – February 2, 1929) was an American author, businessman, professor and genealogist of the Clan Munro. He attended the Massachusetts Institute of Technology and graduated in 1882, although remained active in the affairs of the school. He published a number of mostly scholarly works. He was the father-in-law of Frederic Lansing Day who married his daughter Katharine. Munroe, who lived in Lexington, Massachusetts, was a president of the Lexington Historical Society and Treasurer and President of the Munroe Felt and Paper Company. He edited the second edition of Charles Hudson's History of Lexington.

Munroe graduated with a degree in MIT's Course III, Mining Engineering. By 1883 he had been hired by MIT as a "Clerk." The following year he was the institute's Registrar. In 1886 he became the Secretary of the faculty. In 1892 Munroe became vice-president of the Alumni Association, and he was elected president in 1894. He served as secretary of the MIT corporation from 1907 to 1929.

== Biography ==
James Phinney Munroe was born in Lexington, Massachusetts on June 3, 1862.

He died in Boston on February 2, 1929.

J.P Munroe... was a Boston businessman, active in local affairs and in the life of the Massachusetts Institute of Technology where he had served as Secretary of the Faculty 1882-9 under Walker's presidency. Munroe edited Walkers Discussions in Education (Holt, NY, 1899) as well as writing several books.

— The Correspondence of Alfred Marshall, Economist (pg. 386)

James Phinney Munroe, president of the National Society for the Promotion of Industrial Education, chairman of the Massachusetts Commission for the Blind, chairman of the Committee on Education of the Boston Chamber of Commerce, and secretary of the Corporation, Massachusetts Institute of Technology, began his 1912 book New Demands in Education...

— Taylored Citizenship: State Institutions and Subjectivity (pg. 100)

== Books ==
- A Sketch of the Munro Clan: Also of William Munro Who Deported From Scotland, Settled in Lexington, Massachusetts and Some of His Posterity. 1900. James Munroe was a direct descendant of William Munroe.
- The Destruction of the Convent at Charlestown, Massachusetts, 1834 about the Ursuline Convent Riots. 1901.
- The Massachusetts Institute of Technology (illustrated). 1902.
- William Barton Rogers: Founder of the Massachusetts Institute of Technology 1904.
- The Educational Ideal: An Outline of Its Growth in Modern Times (A part of Heath's Pedagogical Library). 1911.
- New Demands in Education. 1912.
- The Business Man and the High-School Graduate. 1913.
- The New England Conscience. 1915.
- The War's Crippled: How They May Be Made Assets Both to Themselves and to Society. 1918.
- The Advantages of National Auspices of Re-Education. 1918.
- The Human Factor of Education. 1921. Reprinted in 2009 by BiblioBazaar.
- A Life of Francis Amasa Walker. 1923.
