= National Register of Historic Places listings in Manassas, Virginia =

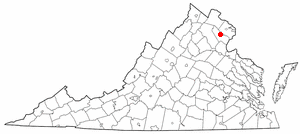
Location of Manassas in Virginia

This is a list of the National Register of Historic Places listings in Manassas, Virginia.

This is intended to be a complete list of the properties and districts on the National Register of Historic Places in the independent city of Manassas, Virginia, United States. The locations of National Register properties and districts for which the latitude and longitude coordinates are included below, may be seen in an online map.

There are 7 properties and districts listed on the National Register in the city.

This National Park Service list is complete through NPS recent listings posted July 10, 2026.

== Current listings ==
	Name on the Register	Image	Date listed	Location	Description
1	Annaburg Manor	Annaburg Manor	April 15, 2022 (#100007614)	9201 Maple St. 38°45′21″N 77°28′08″W	
2	Cannon Branch Fort	Cannon Branch Fort	August 26, 1999 (#99001004)	10611 Gateway Boulevard; 38°44′10″N 77°31′00″W	
3	Liberia	Liberia	March 20, 1980 (#80004215)	8601 Portner Ave. 38°46′01″N 77°27′38″W	
4	Manassas Water Tower	Manassas Water Tower	August 15, 2016 (#16000533)	9000 Quarry St. 38°45′10″N 77°28′10″W	
5	Mayfield Fortification (44PW226)	Mayfield Fortification (44PW226)	August 8, 1989 (#89001063)	8401 Quarry Rd. 38°45′14″N 77°27′09″W	
6	Manassas Historic District	Manassas Historic District	June 29, 1988 (#88000747)	Roughly bounded by Quarry Rd., Prescott and Fairview Aves., the former Southern railroad line, and Grant Ave. 38°45′06″N 77°28′19″W	
7	Manassas Industrial School for Colored Youth	Manassas Industrial School for Colored Youth	August 1, 1994 (#94000760)	9601 Wellington Rd. 38°44′47″N 77°29′16″W	

== See also ==
- List of National Historic Landmarks in Virginia
- National Register of Historic Places listings in Virginia
- National Register of Historic Places listings in Prince William County, Virginia
