= Robert Portner =

American brewer

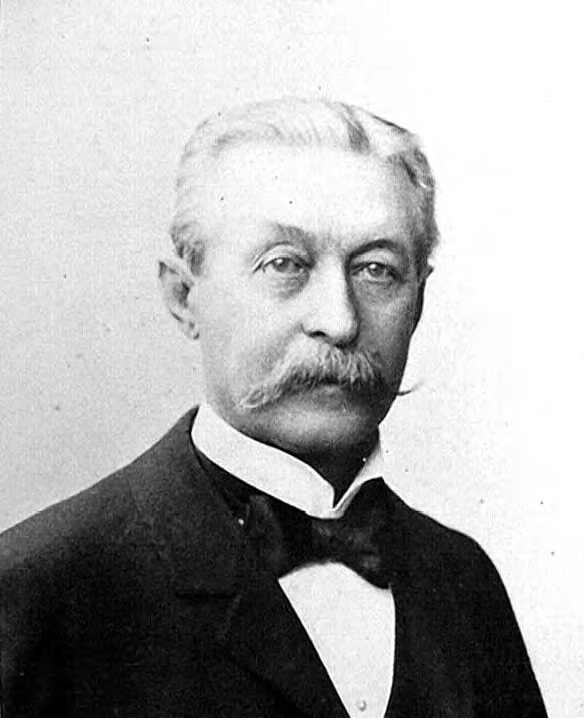
- Born: March 20, 1837; Rahden, Westphalia, Prussia
- Died: May 29, 1906 (aged 69); Manassas, Virginia, US
- Occupation(s): Brewer, Brewery Owner
- Known for: Owner, Robert Portner Brewing Company

Robert Portner (20 March 1837 – 29 May 1906) was an American grocer-turned-brewer who supplied beer to Union troops during the American Civil War. Based in Alexandria, Virginia, Portner found success after the war with the Robert Portner Brewing Company. Portner patented two brewing-related systems, one to purify air and the other to cool beer.

== Early life ==
Robert Portner was born in Rahden, Westphalia, Prussia, on March 20, 1837, and migrated to the United States in 1853. Portner spent eight years in New York and tried his hand at many professions, including baker, tobacconist, and saloon-keeper.

In 1861, with the outbreak of the Civil War, Portner traveled south to Alexandria, Virginia, where he bought a grocery store with his friend Frederick Recker. The two men found success selling food and supplies to Union soldiers stationed in the area. Noting the difficulty in importing beer, Portner and Recker paired with Edward Abner and a local brewer to form Portner and Company, where they brewed their own beer to sell to the troops.

== Robert Portner, Brewer ==
After the war, Portner and Company dissolved. Recker kept the grocery store and Portner focused on expanding the brewery. Portner learned the brewing process and eventually brewed enough to require storage cellars. He was in debt at the time and asked for extensions on his loans. Union Soldiers had left Alexandria and the demand for beer was not as high as it once was. The brewery continued to grow and Portner was able to pay off his debts.

Portner patented a system for chilling lager as well as an ice-making machine that improved the quality of his beer. He eventually had fifty refrigerated train cars used to ship his product. With his successes, Portner further expanded his company to include beer gardens.

== Robert Portner Brewing Company ==
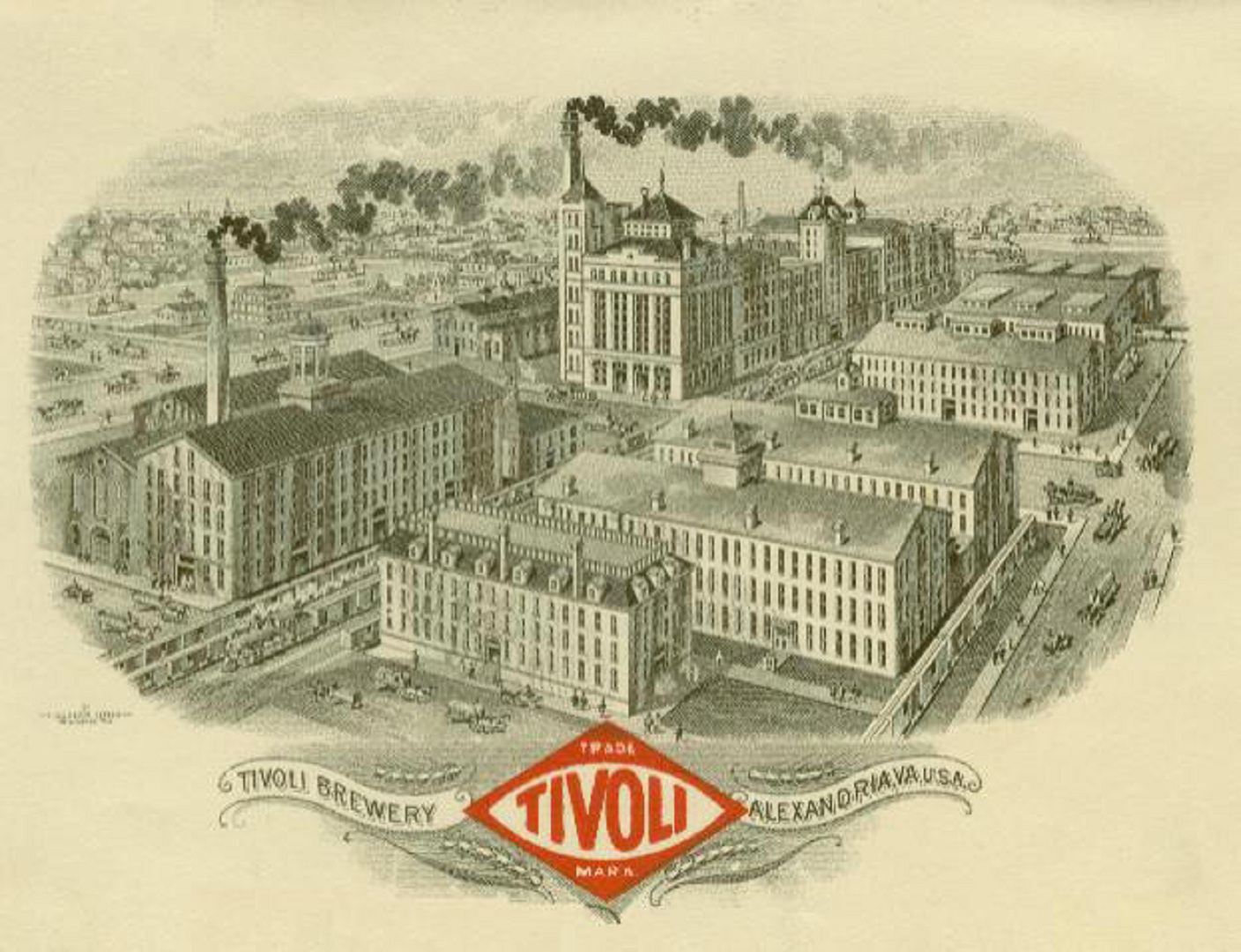
Robert Portner Brewing Company

In 1883, Portner had his brewery incorporated and sold shares of stock to his most successful employees. The first Board of Directors included himself as President, Paul Muhlhauser as Vice-President, Charles A. Strangmann as Secretary & Treasurer, C. G. Herbort, and B. Edward J. Eils. Over the next thirty-three years the brewery expanded and grew to cover two full city blocks and all the latest technological advancements. Depots and bottling houses throughout the South helped to expand the brewery's network, reaching as far south as Augusta, Georgia. Ultimately the brewery closed when Prohibition took effect in Virginia in 1916 and bottling plants including the one at 515 North Washington Street were shuttered. Portner's sons tried to keep the company alive by changing the name to the Virginia Feed & Milling Corporation and converting the brewery into a feed and grain business but did not fare nearly as well, and the company was out of business by 1930.

== Annaburg and family ==
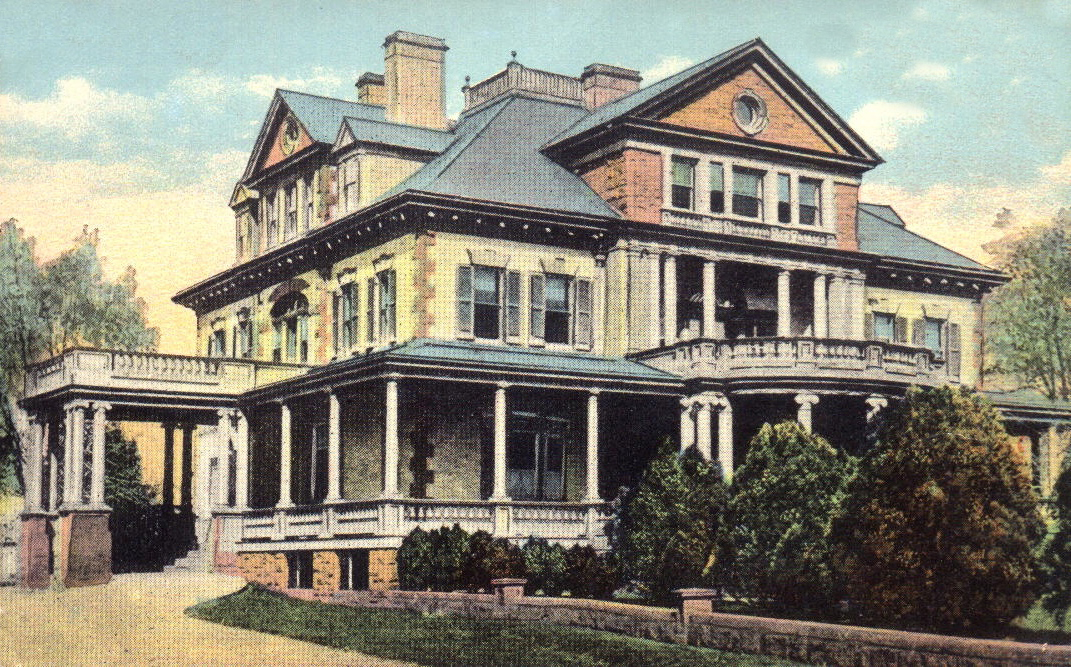
Postcard View of Annaburg

In 1869, Portner was visited by Christian Mathis and Peter Valaer with an invitation to join Peter's brother Jacob as a partner in his brewery and winter garden in Philadelphia, Pennsylvania. He visited Valaer's business, and though he was interested he knew he could not extract himself from his brewery in Alexandria. It was here, though, that he met Jacob and Peter's sister, Anna, whom he fell in love with and married in 1872. Robert and Anna Portner would go on to have 13 children.

In 1883, Portner bought Mathis' estate in Manassas, Virginia, Virginia. When they had visited in the past, Portner's wife had said that the land, with its view of the Bull Run Mountains, reminded her of her homeland in Switzerland, and that she loved it. As time went on, Portner purchased more and more surrounding farmland, growing his estate to nearly 2,200 acres. Comprising primarily the Weir family's Liberia estate and Wilmer McLean's famed Yorkshire estate, Annaburg would encompass a large portion of the Civil War battlefield, historic mansions, and several earthwork Fortifications including Fort Beauregard. Portner managed to turn miles of battle-scarred earth and scraggly cornfields into lush pastures for his stock and horse farms, successfully establish a dairy farm at Liberia, and considerably expand Mathis' original orchards and vineyards. He partnered with Washington, D.C. winemaker Christian Xander to produce wine from his grapes, which won a gold medal at the Paris Exposition of 1900. Annaburg also featured a 300-acre fenced in deer park where Portner often held deer and quail hunting parties.

By 1890, the original Italianate-style house that Mathis had built on the property had become too small for the Portner family, which now included Portner, his wife, and eleven children. He had the house moved and, working with prominent Washington, D.C. architect Gustav Friebus, Portner designed a new home that would combine elements of his favorite European mansions. Built between 1892 and 1894 at a cost of $150,000, Annaburg was a three-story, thirty-five room architectural gem, complete with indoor plumbing, electricity, and porches that wrapped around three sides. It also featured climate control system which combined two of Portner's brewery inventions, making it what is believed to be the first house in the country to have air-conditioning. Annaburg remained in the Portner family until 1947, when his descendants sold the estate to local developer Irving Jackson Breeden.

== Later life and death ==
Throughout his life, Portner suffered from weak nerves and rheumatism. As the stress of his multiple businesses mounted, as well as combating the ever-growing anti-saloon sentiment throughout the country, Portner found himself gradually weaker and in ill health. He took multiple trips to Europe to recuperate, none of which helped long term. By 1903 he had all but formally retired from active business activities and was living full-time at Annaburg. It was here, surrounded by his family, that he died on May 29, 1906. Three days later, he was buried in the family plot in the Manassas Cemetery alongside three of his children.
