= Manassas, Virginia =

Independent city in Virginia, United States

- Independent city
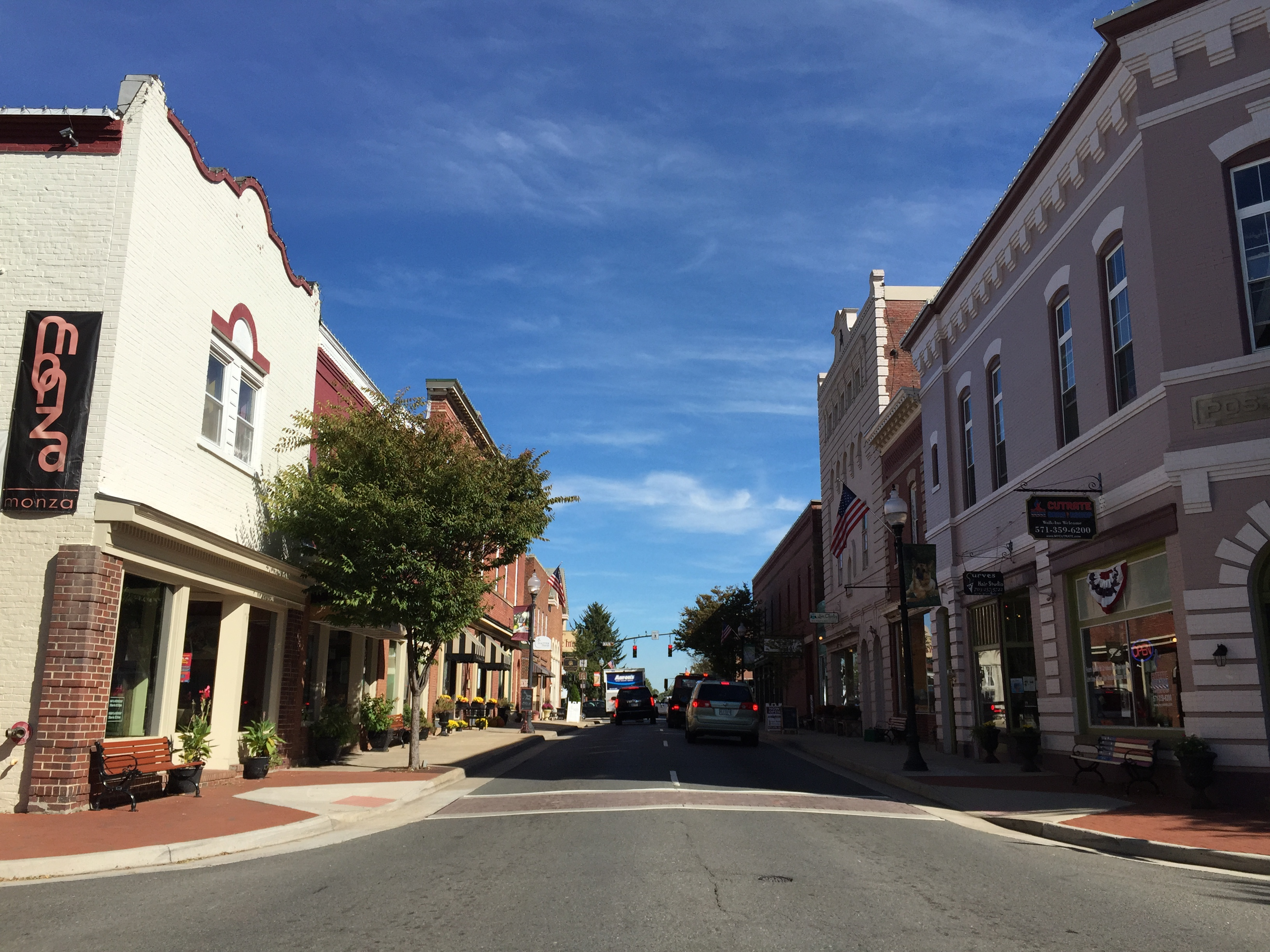
- View of Old Town Manassas from Center Street.

- Flag Seal
- Motto(s): "Historic Heart, Modern Beat"
- Interactive map of Manassas, Virginia
- Location within Virginia Location within the United States
- Coordinates: 38°45′5″N 77°28′35″W
- Country: United States
- State: Virginia
- Pre-incorporation County: Prince William County (None after Incorporation - Independent city)
- Established: 1975
- Named for: Manassas Gap

Government
  - Type: Council-Manager
  - Interim Mayor: Ralph J. Smith (D)
  - City Manager: Steve Burke
  - Vice Mayor: Mark Wolfe (D)
  - City Council: Theresa Coates Ellis (R); Sonia Vásquez Luna (D); Tom Osina (D); Sonia Vásquez Luna (D); Ashley Hutson (D)

Area
  - Total: 9.90 sq mi (25.64 km^{2})
  - Land: 9.84 sq mi (25.49 km^{2})
  - Water: 0.058 sq mi (0.15 km^{2})
- Elevation: 305 ft (93 m)

Population (2020)
  - Total: 42,772
  - Estimate (2025): 44,332 ▲
  - Density: 4,346/sq mi (1,678/km^{2})
- Time zone: UTC−5 (EST)
  - Summer (DST): UTC−4 (EDT)
- ZIP codes: 20108 (PO Box Only), and 20110
- Area codes: 703, 571
- FIPS code: 51-48952
- GNIS feature ID: 1498512
- Website: www.manassasva.gov

Manassas (/məˈnæsəs/), formerly Manassas Junction, is an independent city in the Commonwealth of Virginia, United States. The population was 42,772 at the 2020 Census. It is the county seat of Prince William County, although the two are separate jurisdictions. Manassas borders the independent city of Manassas Park. The Bureau of Economic Analysis includes both Manassas and Manassas Park with Prince William County for statistical purposes.

Manassas contains several historic sites dating from 1825 to 1914. Manassas surrounds the 38-acre (15-hectare) county courthouse, which is located on county property.

Manassas is part of the Washington-Arlington-Alexandria, DC-VA-MD-WV Metropolitan Statistical Area and is in the Northern Virginia region.

== History ==
In 1851, a post office and railroad stop servicing the Orange and Alexandria Railroad (O&A) were established in the area then known as Tudor Hall, named for a nearby plantation home. Soon after, construction began on the Manassas Gap Railroad (MGRR), which was planned to run westward from the O&A at Tudor Hall to the Shenandoah Valley, by way of Manassas Gap. By 1854, the MGRR was completed between Tudor Hall and Strasburg.

In the early 1860s, following the construction of the railroad junction, the village of Tudor Hall became known as Manassas Junction.

Although the first known reference to the word "Manassas" appeared in the form of "Manassas Run" on a 1737 land survey, the origin of the word itself is unknown. There is some evidence that it may have originated from a Jewish innkeeper named Manasseh in the Shenandoah Valley, but this is disputed by others who cite evidence that the word may be of Native American origin, possibly relating to Massanutten, or to the Manahoac people who once inhabited the area.

In July 1861, the First Battle of Bull Run—also known as the Battle of First Manassas —was fought nearby, the first major land battle of the American Civil War. Manassas commemorated its 150th anniversary on July 21–24, 2011.

The Second Battle of Bull Run (or the Battle of Second Manassas) was fought near Manassas on August 28–30, 1862. At that time, Manassas Junction was little more than a railroad crossing, but a strategic one, with rails leading to Richmond, Virginia, Washington, D.C., and the Shenandoah Valley. Despite these two Confederate victories, Manassas Junction was in Union hands for most of the war.

Following the war, the crossroads grew into the town of Manassas, which was incorporated in 1873. In 1894, Manassas was designated the county seat of Prince William County, replacing Brentsville.

Between July 16 and July 22, 1911, veterans from both sides of the war reunited in Manassas for a Peace Jubilee marking 50 years since the First Battle of Bull Run. On July 21, after meeting and shaking hands at Henry House Hill, they picnicked together on the former battlefield before re-uniting again at the then-fairly new Prince William County Courthouse to hear a speech by President William Howard Taft, commemorating the event.

In 1975, Manassas was incorporated as an independent city, and as per Virginia law, was separated from Prince William County.

Manassas is home to Annaburg, built in 1892 by Robert Portner as a summer home. It is believed to be one of the first homes in the United States to have mechanical air conditioning. Annaburg was purchased by the City of Manassas in July 2019 to be restored and preserved as a public park.

The Manassas Historic District; Liberia, a plantation house; the Manassas Water Tower; the Cannon Branch Fort; the Mayfield Fortification; the Manassas Industrial School for Colored Youth; and Annaburg are listed on the National Register of Historic Places.

== Geography ==
Manassas is mainly served by I-66, U.S. 29, Virginia State Route 234 Business and Virginia State Route 28.

According to the United States Census Bureau, the city has a total area of 9.9 square miles (25.6 km^{2}), of which 9.9 square miles (25.6 km^{2}) is land and 0.1 square miles (0.3 km^{2}) (0.5%) is water.

Since its origin the city has been crossed by key transportation routes which have led to the area being incorporated into major developments such as Interstate 66 and major rail lines, and serving as the government center for Prince William County.

=== Climate ===
The climate in this area is characterized by hot, humid summers and generally mild to cool winters. According to the Köppen Climate Classification system, Manassas has a humid subtropical climate, abbreviated "Cfa" on climate maps. Average monthly temperatures range from 33.3 °F (0.7 °C) in January to 76.7 °F (24.8 °C) in July. The local hardiness zone is 7a.

== Demographics ==
Historical population
Census	Pop.	Note	%±
1880	361		—
1890	530		46.8%
1900	817		54.2%
1910	1,217		49.0%
1920	1,305		7.2%
1930	1,215		−6.9%
1940	1,302		7.2%
1950	1,804		38.6%
1960	3,555		97.1%
1970	9,164		157.8%
1980	15,438		68.5%
1990	27,957		81.1%
2000	35,135		25.7%
2010	37,821		7.6%
2020	42,772		13.1%
2025 (est.)	44,332	▲	3.6%
U.S. Decennial Census; 1790-1960 1900-1990; 1990-2000 2010-2020

=== Racial and ethnic composition ===
Manassas city, Virginia – Racial and ethnic composition Note: the US Census treats Hispanic/Latino as an ethnic category. This table excludes Latinos from the racial categories and assigns them to a separate category. Hispanics/Latinos may be of any race.
Race / Ethnicity (NH = Non-Hispanic)	Pop 1980	Pop 1990	Pop 2000	Pop 2010	Pop 2020	% 1980	% 1990	% 2000	% 2010	% 2020
White alone (NH)	13,583	22,545	23,304	17,994	14,816	87.98%	80.64%	66.33%	47.58%	34.64%
Black or African American alone (NH)	1,390	2,841	4,430	4,905	4,914	9.00%	10.16%	12.61%	12.97%	11.49%
Native American or Alaska Native alone (NH)	22	87	103	99	65	0.14%	0.31%	0.29%	0.26%	0.15%
Asian alone (NH)	174	854	1,191	1,861	2,703	1.13%	3.05%	3.39%	4.92%	6.32%
Native Hawaiian or Pacific Islander alone (NH)	x	x	31	41	19	x	x	0.09%	0.11%	0.04%
Other race alone (NH)	75	29	85	125	317	0.49%	0.10%	0.24%	0.33%	0.74%
Mixed race or Multiracial (NH)	x	x	675	920	1,593	x	x	1.92%	2.43%	3.72%
Hispanic or Latino (any race)	194	1,601	5,316	11,876	18,345	1.26%	5.73%	15.13%	31.40%	42.89%
Total	15,438	27,957	35,135	37,821	42,772	100.00%	100.00%	100.00%	100.00%	100.00%

=== 2020 census ===
As of the 2020 census, Manassas had a population of 42,772, a 13.1% increase over the 37,821 residents recorded in 2010. The median age was 34.5 years, 26.0% of residents were under the age of 18, and 10.5% were 65 years of age or older; for every 100 females there were 99.6 males, and for every 100 females age 18 and over there were 96.4 males. All residents lived in urban areas and none in rural areas. There were 13,983 households, 39.8% of which had children under the age of 18, 49.4% were married-couple households, 17.8% had a male householder with no spouse or partner present, and 26.4% had a female householder with no spouse or partner present; 22.9% of households consisted of individuals and 7.9% had someone living alone who was 65 years of age or older. The census counted 14,365 housing units, of which 2.7% were vacant; the homeowner vacancy rate was 0.7% and the rental vacancy rate was 3.3%. Racially, the city was 39.1% White, 12.0% Black or African American, 1.3% American Indian and Alaska Native, 6.4% Asian, 0.1% Native Hawaiian or Other Pacific Islander, 28.0% some other race, 13.2% from two or more races, and 42.9% Hispanic or Latino of any race.

Racial composition as of the 2020 census
Race	Number	Percent
White	16,717	39.1%
Black or African American	5,124	12.0%
American Indian and Alaska Native	536	1.3%
Asian	2,729	6.4%
Native Hawaiian and Other Pacific Islander	36	0.1%
Some other race	11,975	28.0%
Two or more races	5,655	13.2%
Hispanic or Latino (of any race)	18,345	42.9%

=== 2010 census ===
The 2010 census recorded a population of 37,821 in Manassas. This can be broken up ethnically as follows (2010 numbers):

- 9.9% Mexican
- 1.1% Puerto Rican
- 0.2% Cuban
- 20.2% other Hispanic or Latino (Many from El Salvador and Guatemala)

The population density for the city is 3,782.1 people per square mile, and there are an estimated 13,103 housing units in the city with an average housing density of 1,310.3 per square mile. The greatest percentage of housing values of owner-occupied homes (34.8%) is $300,000 to $499,999, with a median owner-occupied housing value of $259,100. The city's highest period of growth was from 1980 to 1989, when 35% of the city's housing stock was constructed.

The ACS estimated median household income for the city in 2020 was $86,227. 36% of the population has a college degree. Almost as many people commute into the City of Manassas for work (13,316) as out (13,666), with the majority of out commuters traveling to Fairfax and Prince William counties for their jobs. Unemployment in the city as of February 2022 was 2.5%, which was below that of the United States at 3.8%. Of the 21,221 working age residents, 20,620 were employed. City residents are primarily employed in Professional, Scientific and Technical Services, and Health Care and Social Assistance.

The ACS estimated mean travel time to work for the given population in 2021 was approximately 34.7 minutes. This travel time is about 25 percent higher than the figure for Virginia (28.2 minutes) and about 1.3 times the figure for the entire United States (26.8 minutes).

Regarding the means of transportation to work:

- 73% of individuals drive alone to work.
- 12% carpool with others.
- 4% use public transit.
- 2% walk to work.
- 8% work from home.

== Economy ==
The city's largest employer is Micron Technology. Headquartered in Boise, Idaho, this manufacturer of semiconductors operates its wafer factory in Manassas, where it employs 1,650 people directly, and several hundred others through vendor contracts. In December 2018, Micron began a $3 billion-dollar expansion project at the Manassas site, and it's expected to create 1,100 jobs by 2030. Other major employers include Lockheed Martin (1500 employees) and the Novant Prince William Health System (1400 employees). In 2019 High Purity Systems, a locally based high-tech contracting company, announced plans to invest $8.5 million in new facilities to triple production capability, marking the continued expansion of high-tech firms in the area.

The Manassas Regional Airport has 26 businesses operating out of the airport property. There are 415 based airplanes and two fixed-base operators, APP Jet Center and Dulles Aviation.

11% of people working in Manassas live in the city, while 89% commute in. 36% commute from Prince William County and 18% commute from Fairfax. Additionally 16,700 people commute from Manassas to the surrounding areas. In 2016, 3.3% of Manassas residents were unemployed.

In 2017 the city created new "streetscape standards" and announced plans for the Mathis Avenue Streetscape Project, aimed at developing Mathis Avenue from Sudley Road to Liberia Avenue into a more pedestrian-friendly, walkable area with significantly improved traffic congestion. The plan is estimated to cost the city $7.3 million and to be completed by 2026.

== Arts and culture ==
First Friday festivals occur on the first Friday of every month, when the city showcases local art and organizes themed activities. The city museum opened in 1973 in preparation for the city's centennial and a renovation and expansion was completed in fall 2023.

== Parks and recreation ==
The city's park system encompasses 260 acres (110 ha) of parkland, featuring walking trails, playgrounds, athletic fields, and recreational facilities. Through a shared-use agreement with the City School Board, the municipal government operates an additional 44 acres (18 ha) of playgrounds and school recreational areas. Additionally, the city owns eight historic properties and operates the Manassas Museum, which preserves local history.

- Stonewall Park & Pool
- Annaburg Historic Site
- Liberia House Historic Site
- Cannon Branch Fort
- Baldwin Park
- Dean Park

== Government ==
Manassas has a council-manager system of government. As of February 2025 the city manager is Steve Burke; the interim mayor is Ralph Smith; and the vice mayor is Mark Wolfe.

=== Presidential election results ===
From 1976 to 2004, Manassas voted for the Republican nominee, and since 2008 Manassas has voted for the Democratic nominee, which follows a pattern similar to its larger neighbor Prince William.

United States presidential election results for Manassas, Virginia
Year	Republican		Democratic		Third party(ies)	
Year	No.	%	No.	%	No.	%
1976	1,992	53.30%	1,646	44.05%	99	2.65%
1980	3,009	60.76%	1,565	31.60%	378	7.63%
1984	4,613	71.34%	1,824	28.21%	29	0.45%
1988	5,980	68.59%	2,658	30.49%	81	0.93%
1992	5,453	48.89%	3,647	32.70%	2,054	18.41%
1996	5,799	52.91%	4,378	39.95%	783	7.14%
2000	6,752	54.41%	5,262	42.40%	396	3.19%
2004	7,257	56.24%	5,562	43.11%	84	0.65%
2008	5,975	43.85%	7,518	55.17%	134	0.98%
2012	6,463	42.52%	8,478	55.78%	259	1.70%
2016	5,953	38.63%	8,423	54.66%	1,035	6.72%
2020	6,256	36.87%	10,356	61.03%	356	2.10%
2024	6,670	41.43%	9,048	56.20%	382	2.37%

== Education ==
The City of Manassas is served by the Manassas City Public Schools. There are five elementary schools in Manassas, two intermediate schools, a middle school, and a high school. In 2006, Mayfield Intermediate School opened, serving students in fifth and sixth grade. Due to growth, Baldwin Intermediate School opened in September 2017, also serving 5th and 6th graders.

Some schools in the Prince William County Public Schools district have Manassas addresses, though they are located, and serve areas, outside the Manassas city limits. An exception is Pennington Traditional School, which despite being within city limits, serves students living in Prince William County.

Seton School, a private Roman Catholic junior and senior high school affiliated with the Diocese of Arlington, provides Catholic education from its Manassas location. The All Saints Catholic School at the All Saints Parish provides Catholic Education from pre-K through 8th grade. The All Saints Catholic School was a Presidential Blue Ribbon Award winner in 2009.

Also in the vicinity of Manassas are branch campuses of American Public University System, George Mason University, Northern Virginia Community College, ECPI College of Technology and Strayer University. Though some of these are just outside the city limits in Prince William County, NVCC and Strayer call these branches their Manassas Campuses.

Public schools in Manassas:

- Baldwin Elementary School
- Jennie Dean Elementary School
- Richard C. Haydon Elementary School
- George C. Round Elementary School
- Weems Elementary School
- Baldwin Intermediate School
- Mayfield Intermediate School
- Grace E. Metz Middle School
- Osbourn High School

== Infrastructure ==
=== Transportation ===
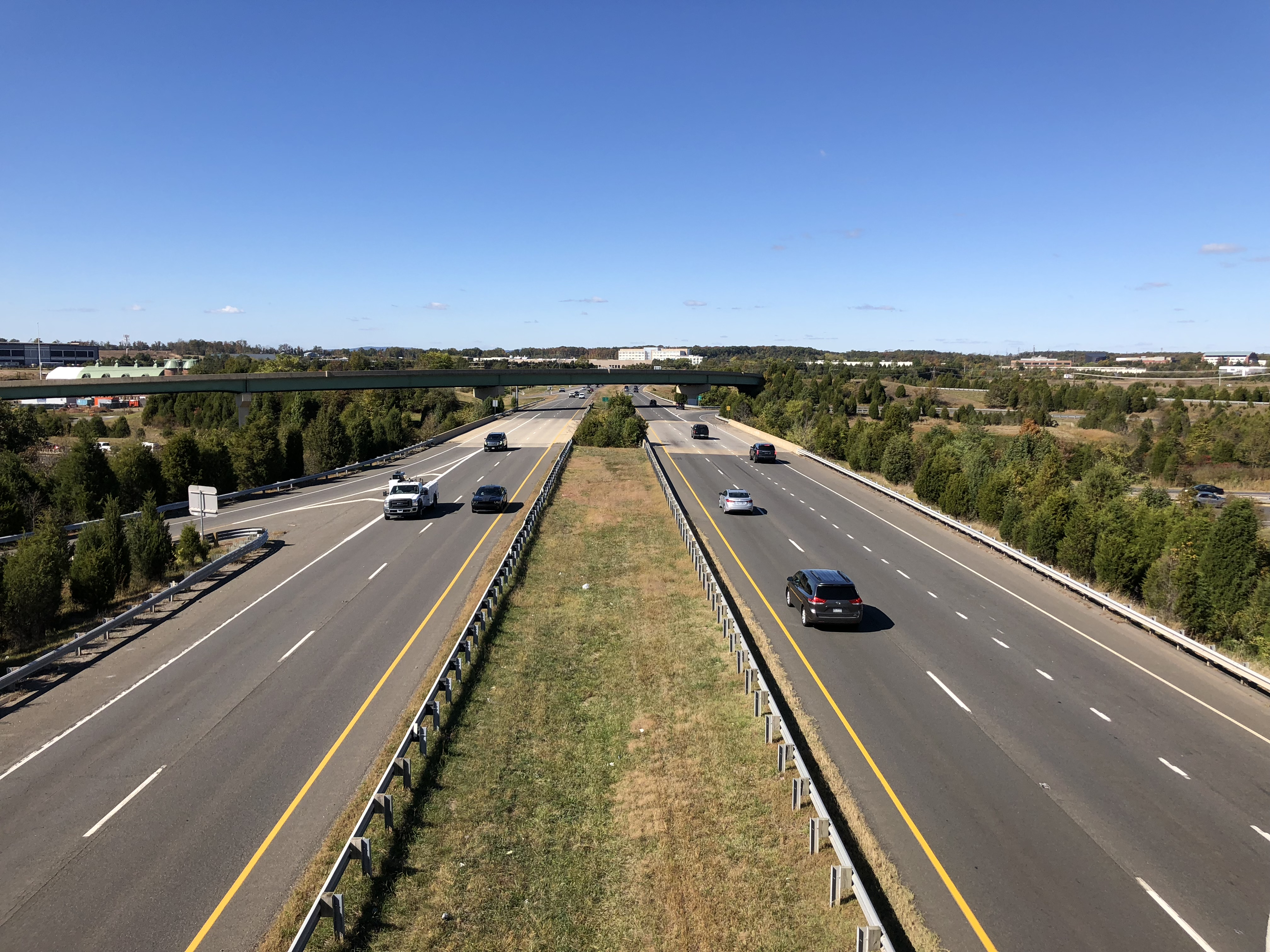
Route 234 in Manassas

==== Major highways ====
The major roads into and out of Manassas are Virginia State Route 28, Virginia State Route 234 and Virginia State Route 234 Business. I-66 and US-29 service Manassas, but neither passes through the city itself.

==== Airports ====
Manassas Regional Airport is within the city limits. It is the busiest general aviation airport in Virginia, with more than 415 aircraft and 26 businesses based onsite, including charter companies, avionics, maintenance, flight schools and aircraft services.

Between 2019 and 2021 APP Jet Center, a jet servicing company, built three new hangars fit for larger private planes along with extensive renovations to their existing hangars.

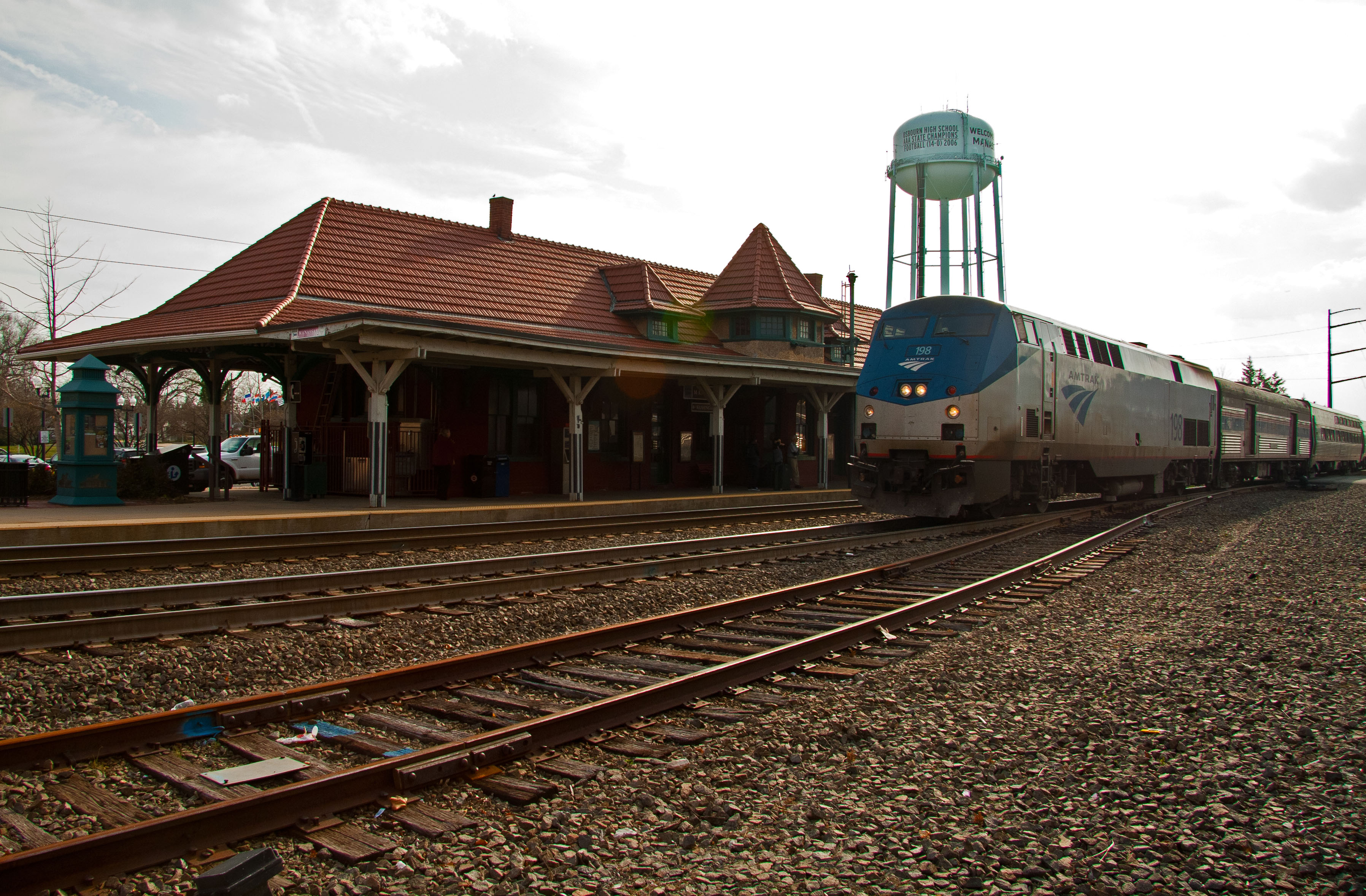
Amtrak 50, the Cardinal, arriving in Manassas station, which is shared with Virginia Railway Express and hosts the city's visitors center

==== Rail transportation ====
Manassas began life as Manassas Junction, so named for the railroad junction between the Orange and Alexandria Railroad and the Manassas Gap Railroad. The O&A owned the railway from Alexandria through Manassas to points south, ending in Orange, Virginia, while the MGRR was an independent line constructed from Manassas Junction through the Manassas Gap westward. In addition Manassas was the site of the first large scale military use of railroad transportation.

These original routes are now owned by the Norfolk Southern railroad. Amtrak and the Virginia Railway Express (VRE) provide regular inter-city and commuter service to the city and surrounding area on the tracks owned by NS. Manassas station is served by VRE and three Amtrak routes: the New York City to Chicago Cardinal, Boston to Roanoke Northeast Regional, and New York to New Orleans Crescent.

The train station was also used for the cover photo of Stephen Stills' album Manassas.

== Notable people ==
- Jim Bucher, infielder and outfielder in Major League Baseball
- Ryan Burroughs, professional rugby league footballer currently playing for the Washington DC Cavalry
- Jose Carranza, soccer player
- Jeff Causey, soccer player and coach
- Mason Diaz, NASCAR driver
- Julian Dobbs, Anglican bishop
- Danny Doyle, Irish folk singer
- Wilmer Fields, pitcher and third baseman in Negro league baseball
- Brandon Hogan, football player
- Elizabeth Friench Johnson (1890–1979), college professor
- Chaney Kley (1972–2007), American film and television actor
- Jon Knott, Major League Baseball outfielder
- Jeremy Linn, 1996 Summer Olympics swimmer and current swimming coach
- Wilmer McLean, Wholesale grocer, owner of the McLean House
- Mike O'Meara, radio personality
- Harry J. Parrish (1922–2006), longtime member of the Virginia House of Delegates
- Leven Powell, also Levin, (1737–1810), U.S. Representative from Virginia
- Jason Richardson, American guitarist
- Kevin Ricks, convicted sex offender
- David Robinson, American basketball player
- Danica Roem, the first ever openly transgender woman to be elected to a US legislature
- Ravi Shankar, American poet
- Joanna Mary Berry Shields, teacher and founder of Alpha Kappa Alpha sorority.
- C. J. Sapong, American soccer player
- Leeann Tweeden, model
- Lucky Whitehead, former National Football League wide receiver
- Ryan Williams, running back for the Dallas Cowboys
- George Zimmerman, shot and killed Trayvon Martin, a minor, and later acquitted in Florida
- Tyleik Williams, college football defensive tackle for the Ohio State Buckeyes

== In popular culture ==
- A season 6 episode of the Discovery Channel series A Haunting, called Marked by Evil, takes place in Manassas in 2008–2011.
- Portions of the music video for the Steve Winwood song "Back in the High Life Again" were filmed at the train station in Manassas.
- In episode three of Marvel's “What if…?” Manassas, Virginia is featured as Natasha Romanoff travels to a library.
- In crime drama Criminal Minds, BAU profiler Aaron Hotchner (Thomas Gibson) is from Manassas.
- Country-rock supergroup Manassas, led by Stephen Stills and former Byrd Chris Hillman, took their name from the city, and the cover photo of their self-titled debut was taken at the Manassas Train Station.

== See also ==
- Manassas Police Department
- National Register of Historic Places listings in Manassas, Virginia
