= Battery B, 1st New York Light Artillery =

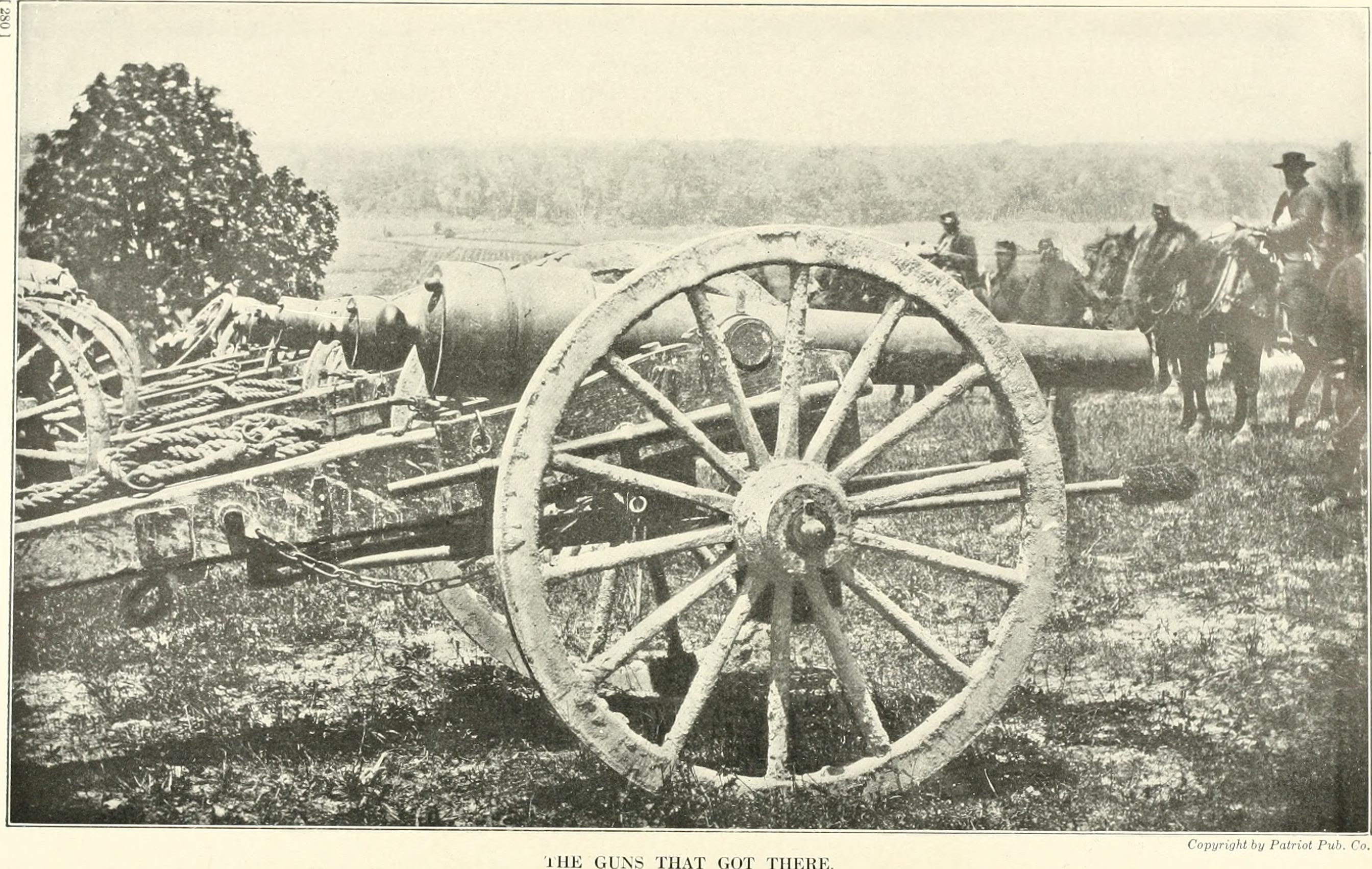
- Battery B during the Battle of Chickahominy
- Active: August 31, 1861 - June 18, 1865
- Country: United States
- Allegiance: Union
- Branch: Artillery
- Equipment: 10-pounder Parrott rifle
- Engagements: Siege of Yorktown; Battle of Seven Pines; Seven Days Battles; Battle of Oak Grove; Battle of Gaines's Mill; Battle of Savage's Station; Battle of White Oak Swamp; Battle of Glendale; Battle of Malvern Hill; Battle of Antietam; Battle of Fredericksburg; Battle of Chancellorsville; Battle of Gettysburg; Bristoe Campaign; Mine Run Campaign; Battle of Spotsylvania Court House; Battle of Totopotomoy Creek; Battle of Cold Harbor; Siege of Petersburg; Battle of Globe Tavern; Battle of Peebles' Farm; Battle of Boydton Plank Road; Appomattox Campaign; Battle of White Oak Road; Battle of Five Forks; Third Battle of Petersburg; Battle of Appomattox Court House

Battery B, 1st New York Light Artillery was an artillery battery that served in the Union Army during the American Civil War.

== Service ==
The battery was organized at Baldwinsville, New York and mustered in for a three-year enlistment on September 24, 1861 under the command of Captain Rufus D. Pettit.

The battery was attached to Artillery Reserve, Army of the Potomac, November 1861 to March 1862. Artillery, 1st Division, II Corps, Army of the Potomac, to May 1862. Artillery Brigade, II Corps, to May 1863. 1st Volunteer Brigade, Artillery Reserve, Army of the Potomac, to July 1863. Artillery Brigade, II Corps, to July 1863. 2nd Volunteer Brigade, Artillery Brigade, Army of the Potomac, to December 1863. Artillery Reserve, Army of the Potomac, to January 1864. 1st Brigade, Artillery Reserve, Army of the Potomac, to March 1864. 2nd Brigade, Artillery Reserve, Army of the Potomac, to May 16, 1864. Artillery Brigade, V Corps, Army of the Potomac, to June 1865.

Battery B, 1st New York Light Artillery mustered out of service on June 18, 1865.

== Detailed service ==
Left New York for Washington, D.C., October 31, 1861, and duty in the defenses of that city until March 1862. Advanced on Manassas, Va., March 10–15, 1862. Moved to the Peninsula, Va., March. Siege of Yorktown April 5-May 4. Battle of Seven Pines May 31-June 1. Oak Grove, near Fair Oaks, June 25. Seven Days Battles before Richmond June 25-July 1. Battles of Gaines's Mills June 27, Peach Orchard and Savage Station June 29, White Oak Swamp Bridge and Glendale June 30, Malvern Hill July 1. At Harrison's Landing until August 16. Moved to Alexandria, then to Centreville August 16–30. Near Centreville September 1. Germantown Road September 2. Battle of Antietam September 16–17. Duty at Harpers Ferry September 22 to October 29. Reconnaissance to Charlestown October 16–17. Advance up Loudoun Valley and movement to Falmouth, Va., October 20-November 17. Snicker's Gap November 2. Falmouth November 17. Battle of Fredericksburg December 12–15. Duty at Falmouth until April 27, 1863. "Mud March" January 20–24, 1863. Chancellorsville Campaign April 27-May 6. Battle of Chancellorsville May 1–5. Battle of Gettysburg July 1–3. Bristoe Campaign October 9–22. Advance to line of the Rappahannock November 7–8. Mine Run Campaign November 26-December 2. Campaign from the Rapidan to the James May 3-June 15, 1864. Battle of the Wilderness May 5–7. Laurel Hill May 8. Spotsylvania May 8–12. Spotsylvania Court House May 12–21. Jericho Mills May 23. On line of the Pamunkey May 26–28. Totopotomoy May 28–31. Cold Harbor June 1–12. Bethesda Church June 1–3. Before Petersburg June 16–18. Siege of Petersburg June 16, 1864 to April 2, 1865. Mine Explosion, Petersburg, July 30, 1864 (reserve). Weldon Railroad August 18–21. Poplar Grove Church, Peebles' Farm, September 29-October 2. Boydton Plank Road, Hatcher's Run, October 27–28. Appomattox Campaign March 28-April 9, 1865. White Oak Road March 31. Five Forks April 1. Pall of Petersburg April 2. Pursuit of Lee April 3–9. Appomattox Court House April 9. Surrender of Lee and his army. Moved to Washington, D.C., May. Grand Review of the Armies May 23.

== Casualties ==
The battery lost a total of 26 men during service; 16 enlisted men killed or mortally wounded, 10 enlisted men died of disease.

== Commanders ==
- Captain Rufus D. Pettit - resigned May 30, 1863
- Captain James McKay Rorty - killed in action at the Battle of Gettysburg
- Captain Albert S. Sheldon - discharged December 16, 1864
- Captain Robert E. Rogers

== See also ==
- List of New York Civil War regiments
- New York in the Civil War
