= Rufus D. Pettit =

Officer in the American Civil War

Rufus D Pettit
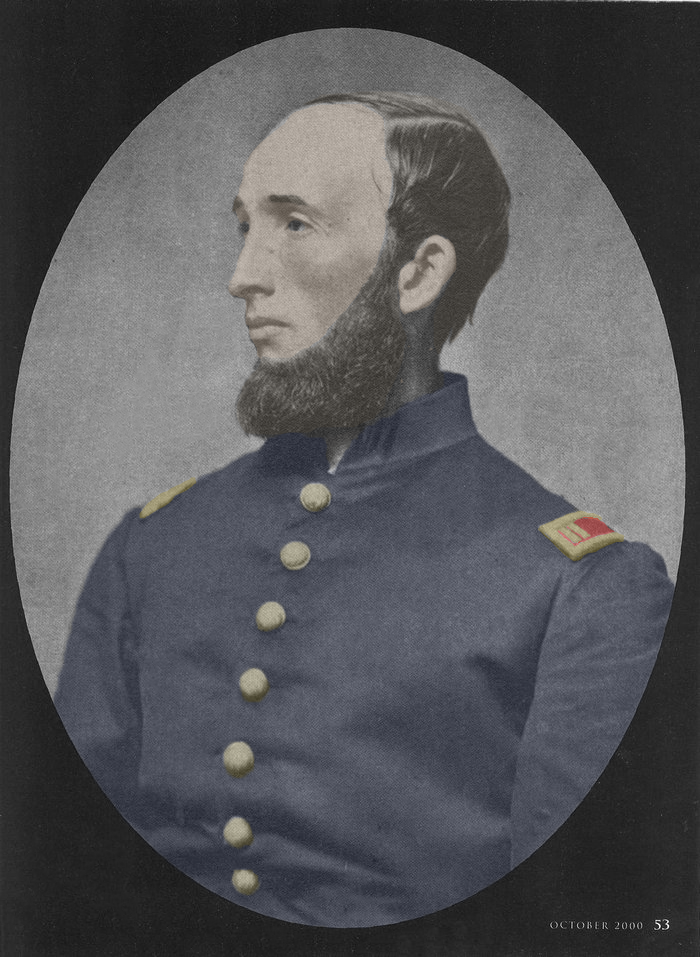
- Captain Rufus D Pettit
- Born: July 4, 1825; Bridgewater, New York, U.S.
- Died: August 24, 1891 (aged 66) Baldwinsville, New York, U.S.
- Allegiance: United States of America
- Branch: United States Army; Union Army
- Service years: 1846-1847, 1861–1865
- Rank: Artillery Captain
- Commands: Battery B, 1st New York Light Artillery
- Conflicts: Mexican American War: Siege of Veracruz; Battle of Cerro Gordo; Battle for Mexico City; American Civil War: Siege of Yorktown; Battle of Seven Pines; Seven Days Battles; Battle of Oak Grove; Battle of Gaines's Mill; Battle of Savage's Station; Battle of White Oak Swamp; Battle of Glendale; Battle of Malvern Hill; Battle of Antietam; Battle of Fredericksburg; Battle of Chancellorsville

Rufus D Pettit (July 4, 1825 – October 24, 1891) was an Officer in the American Civil War. He was most famous for leading the 1st New York Artillery, Battery B into combat during the first two years of the war.

== Early life ==
Rufus D Pettit was born on July 4, 1825. Both of his parents died when Pettit was three years old. Pettit was then sent to live with his aunt and uncle in the Cold Springs area of Baldwinsville, New York. Here he was raised, eventually becoming an apprentice to an architect.

== Military service ==
=== Mexican American War ===
In 1846, the Mexican-American War broke out. Pettit enlisted with the 1st New York Volunteer Infantry, Company A. He served in the entire war, eventually ranking up to Sergeant. He fought in over five battles and was noted for his expert marksmanship. During the Battle for Mexico City, he reportedly shot a Mexican flag from its pole.

=== American Civil War ===
On August 31, 1861, Rufus D Pettit organized the Cold Spring Rifles, which was soon redesignated the Battery B, 1st New York Light Artillery. The Battery was issued 10lbs Parrot Rifles. After extensive training in New York, the regiment was assigned to the Artillery Brigade, 1st Division, II Corps.

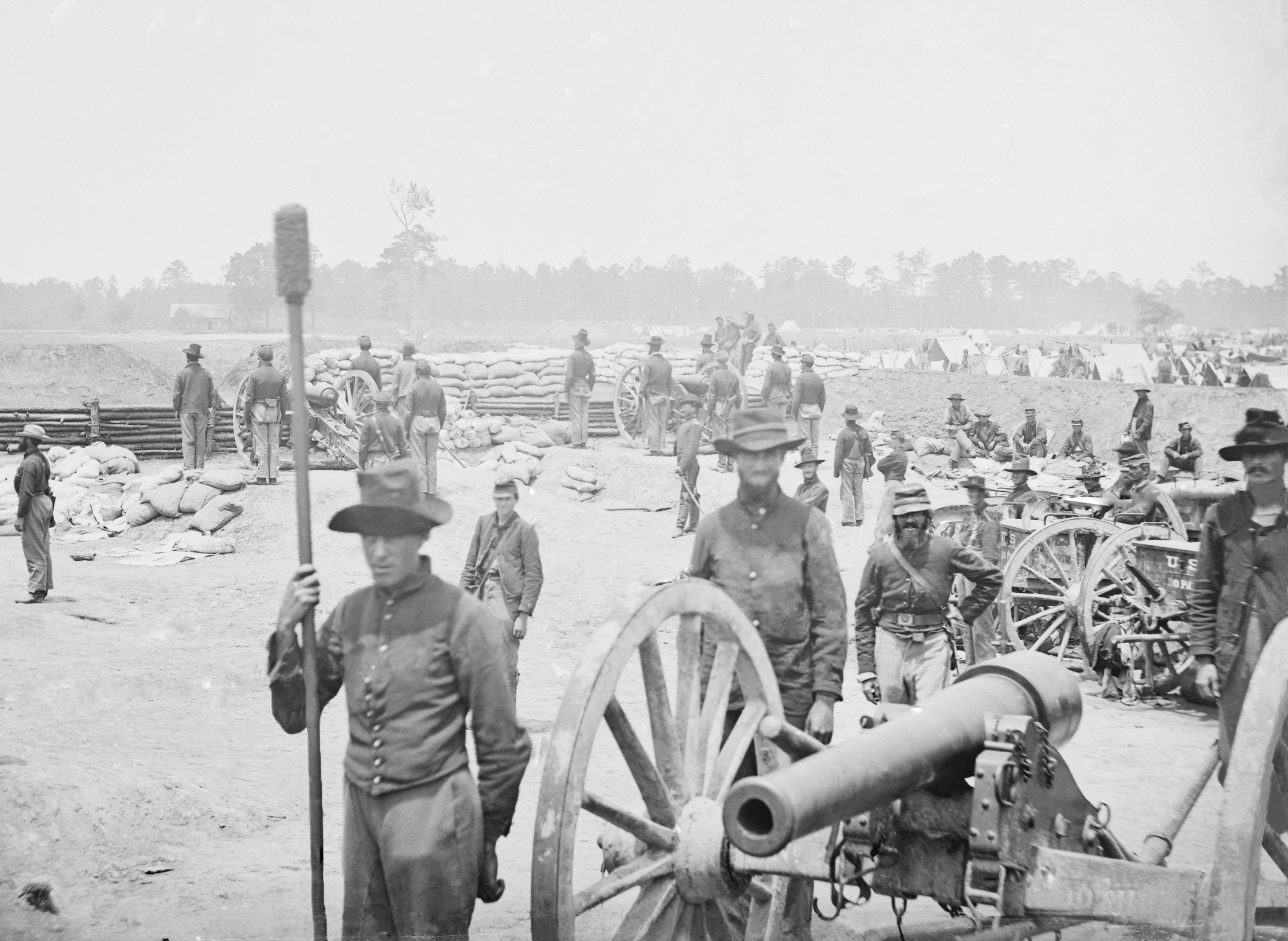
Pettit's Battery deployed during the Peninsula Campaign

The 1st New York Battery B went into action for the first time during the siege of Yorktown. They eventually went on to fight in all of the battles of the Seven Days, seeing heavy action during II Corp's gallant defense at the Battle of Seven Pines. The regiment also saw fierce fighting during the massive artillery duel at the Battle of White Oak Swamp, and at the bloody repulse of the Confederates during the Battle of Malvern Hill. At the end of the Peninsula Campaign, Rufus D Pettit reported sick with "fatigue, exposure, and chronic diarrhea." These ailments had been bothering him most of his life and would eventually force his discharge due to medical conditions.

Rufus Pettit and the 1st NY Battery B moved north again and fought during the Battle of Antietam. The 1st NY Battery B was deployed to the East side of the East Woods and was not heavily engaged. The Battery then went on to fight at the Battle of Fredericksburg, where they watched as their fellow division members, the Irish Brigade, hopelessly charged Marye's Heights.

Pettit's final action was at the Battle of Chancellorsville. At Chancellorsville, fellow division member Col. Edward E. Cross of the 5th New Hampshire Infantry Regiment noted the regiments gallant efforts to hold their ground. "Sunday morning…Petitt’s iron battery of twenty-pound Parrott’s, all firing rapidly. In a few moments the enemy got a splendid rifle battery into position, which fired with wonderful accuracy. So heavy was the fire that Captain Petit was compelled for the first time during the war to limber up and leave–but was instantly ordered back." Pettit would later write of the action of civilians shooting shotguns at the retreating Union soldiers, and of woman and children throwing rocks at the fleeing Union troops.

After the Chancellorsville, Pettit resigned due to his medical conditions. He remained at home for a year, before enlisting with the Veteran Reserve Corps. On July 20, 1864, he was assigned superintendent of the Union prisons in Alexandria, Virginia. Here, troubles began. He gained a reputation as a sadistic and cruel warden who oversaw beatings and other cruel punishment of prisoners at the Washington Street Military Prison and other military prisons in Alexandria. Pettit was eventually tried and convicted of mistreating prisoners at a court martial and dismissed from the service.

== Death and afterward ==
Pettit died on August 24, 1891, at the age of 66.

== See also ==
- Battery B, 1st New York Light Artillery
- II Corps (Union Army)
