= 515 North Washington Street =

Historic building in Alexandria, Virginia

- U.S. Historic district – Contributing property
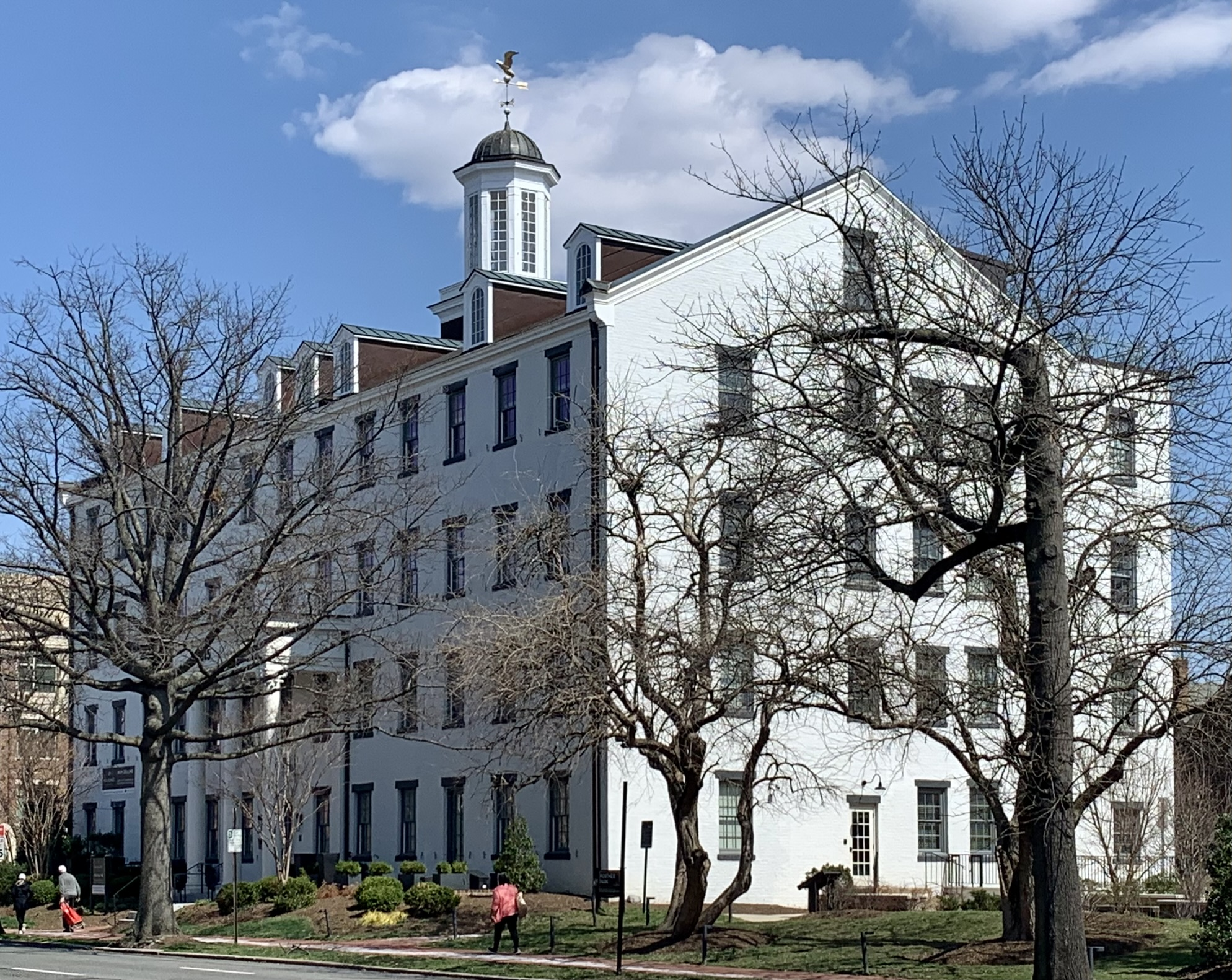
- 515 North Washington Street in 2022

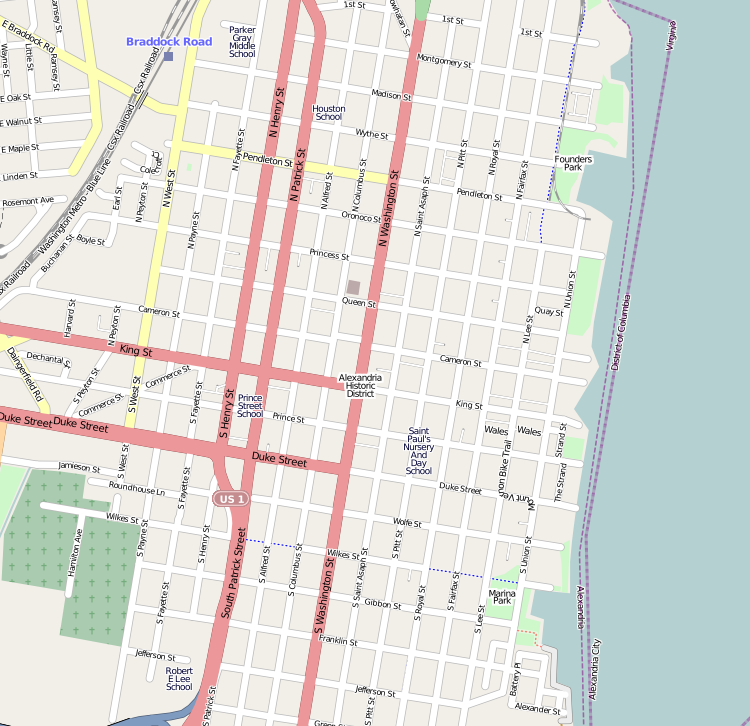
- Location within Alexandria Historical District Location within Virginia Location within the United States
- Location: 515 North Washington Street; Alexandria, Virginia
- Coordinates: 38°48′37.4″N 77°2′44.8″W
- Built: 1848
- Part of: Alexandria Historic District
- Designated CP: November 13, 1966

The historic building located at 515 North Washington Street in Alexandria, Virginia, United States, has been used as a cotton mill, prison, factory, office space, and apartments. It was built by the Mount Vernon Manufacturing Company in 1848 in present-day Old Town Alexandria. After the original owners were unsuccessful with their cotton mill business venture, the building was sold in 1855. After a renovation, the new owner was able to operate a successful business, but his success was cut short after the Civil War began. The building was one of many local businesses that the Union Army seized after it entered Alexandria. After briefly serving as a hospital and warehouse, the mill was repurposed and renamed the Washington Street Military Prison, the largest of the five Civil War prisons in the city. Rufus Dudley Pettit was named warden in 1864 and he was responsible for widespread abuse and sadistic behavior towards prisoners.

After the war the building briefly reverted to operating as a cotton mill, but after that business venture failed, it was sold and sat empty until 1902 when Robert Portner and his Portner Brewing Company purchased the property. The building operated as a bottling plant until Virginia passed Prohibition legislation, resulting in the plant's closure. It was purchased by the Express Spark Plug Company which made spark plugs there until it went out of business in 1928. The building was converted into the Belle Haven Apartment House in the 1930s and it remained in residential use until 1981, when it was renovated and became office space. The building was the headquarters for the International Association of Chiefs of Police from 1992 until 2014, when the property once again underwent a renovation. Since the building is a contributing property to the Alexandria Historic District, the project underwent a review by historic preservation organizations. The property was converted into The Mill, a 25-unit apartment building featuring original architectural details and an adjoining park.

An interesting feature of the building is that a mannequin nicknamed Oscar is perched in the cupola. There are a few rumors as to Oscar's origin, but the most likely story is that it was brought into the building sometime around 1920. The other rumors are that it was placed there by local police after an employee was brutally murdered on the property in 1854 or that prison guards would use it as a stand-in when they would go on breaks. Oscar is treated as an historical part of the building and during the most recent renovation, it was carefully preserved.

== History ==
=== Original owners and construction ===
In 1847 a group of businessmen formed the Mount Vernon Manufacturing Company in Alexandria, Virginia. On April 19 of that year the company purchased a one acre (0.4 ha) lot on the east side of North Washington Street between Oronoco and Pendleton Streets. Construction of a five-story brick building measuring 110 feet (33.5 m) by 50 feet (15.2 m) topped with a cupola and several outbuildings was completed the following year. The building became Alexandria's first cotton mill, employing around 150 people, mostly women, who worked 11 hours a day and earned between $12-$17 a month. It featured two 30-horsepower steam engines which powered 3,840 spindles and 124 looms.

The mill was not a successful business venture and in March 1852, the group chose to lease the building to another company starting that August. A tragic event that took place at the property occurred on July 21, 1854, when night watchman Michael Kiggin was found brutally murdered. Despite two people being arrested and mill owners offering a $200 reward, the suspects were later released and no one was ever convicted of the crime. Later that year a fire broke out in the factory when a sack of cotton was placed near a gas lamp. The fire was quickly extinguished and the business reopened a few days later.

The building's owners decided to sell the property in 1855 for $26,000, which included the factory, a picking house, engine house, waste house, and a brick office. Three years later the new owners sold the property to Philadelphia businessman John Rosencrantz for $35,000. Following a renovation, the factory reopened and the business was successful for the next several years, with around 5,000 yards (4,572 m) of cotton sheeting being produced each day.

=== Civil War ===
During the Civil War Virginia voted to secede from the Union in April 1861. The following month on May 24, the Union Army entered Alexandria, which is situated a few miles south of Washington, D.C., in order to prevent an attack on the capital and to launch attacks further south. Many residents who were loyal to the Confederacy fled Alexandria and some local businesses were seized by Union troops. Since the cotton mill was a rather large building, it was one of the buildings seized and requisitioned.

The Union Army repurposed the mill into a hospital, warehouse, and later a prison, and renamed the building the Washington Street Military Prison. It was the largest of five military prisons in Alexandria during the Civil War, the others being the City Jail on St. Asaph Street, the former slave trading business Franklin and Armfield Office on Duke Street, the Green Furniture Factory on South Fairfax Street, and the Odd Fellows Hall at 218 North Columbus Street. In addition to Confederate prisoners of war, the Washington Street Military Prison also held deserters from the Union Army. The building was painted white and a fence was added around the perimeter. During the war up to 1,500 prisoners would be housed on the property at any given time.

In its early history prisoners at Washington Street Military Prison were treated humanely and had access to adequate food and clothing. This changed when Captain Rufus Dudley Pettit took command of Alexandria's military prisons. Pettit had served in the Union Army beginning in 1861, fighting in major battles including several in the Peninsula campaign, as well as the Battle of Antietam and Battle of Fredericksburg, but had to resign from active duty for health reasons. After Pettit began overseeing the city's prisons, he gained a reputation as being cruel and sadistic towards the prisoners. He directed that prisoners be handcuffed behind their backs and hung from the ceiling, or handcuffed by their wrists and left hanging outside for 12 hours at a time, where they would be exposed to rain or extreme temperatures. Prisoners were often beaten and left with broken bones. Pettit would sometimes stand outside the building and shoot at prisoners who tried looking out one of the windows.

After the war Pettit's reputation for cruelty drew the attention of his superiors and he was court-martialed in November 1865. Pettit was convicted of inhumane treatment of prisoners and dishonorably discharged from the Army. He moved to New York where he later practiced law. Pettit's papers during his time as the prison warden have been preserved and are available at the Alexandria Library.

=== Later industrial use ===
In 1866 businessman Abijah Thomas purchased the building and attempted to revive the cotton mill's pre-war success. Unfortunately for Thomas, the business did not succeed and two of his creditors, Turnbull Baxter & Co. and the First National Bank of Alexandria, ended up suing each other. Their case made its way to the United States Supreme Court which ruled their suit should be resolved by a lower court instead. The property was purchased for $33,000 by Baltimore businessman Robert Garrett in 1877, but he closed it to prevent the mill from being a competitor to his business in Maryland. The building sat empty until 1900 when Garrett's heirs sold it to another Baltimore businessman, Henry Chipman, for $12,000. Two years later the property was put up for public auction where the winning bid was made by Harry and John Aitcheson on behalf of the Robert Portner Corporation, owned by Robert Portner.

For the next 14 years the building operated as a bottling plant for the Portner Brewing Company. After Virginia passed Prohibition legislation in 1916, the plant closed. The property was sold in 1918 to the Express Spark Plug Company which made spark plugs in the building until 1928. The company painted 6-foot (1.8 m) tall lettering on the building featuring its name and advertising slogans such as "Be Good to Your Motor" and "The plug of continuous reliability." After the factory closed the building was used by the United States Department of Agriculture during the early years of the Great Depression.

=== Residential use ===
In 1935 the building was converted for residential use, becoming the Belle Haven Apartment House, and a portico with Corinthian columns was added to the entrance. It was around this time a mannequin nicknamed Oscar that had been displayed in a second-floor window for several years first gained media attention. A reporter for American Motorist magazine wanted to know the history of the mannequin and through his research, was told a few possibilities of its origin. The most likely origin is that it had been placed there sometime around 1920 by the Bureau of Fisheries to advertise angling. One of the spark plug factory workers told the reporter "We used to keep it back here at the end of this room. It looked so natural and lifelike we would play practical jokes with it." Another rumor as to when the mannequin arrived is that during the Civil War a prison guard would place it in the cupola when he would go on break. The more well-known rumor to its origin is that local police placed the mannequin in the cupola as a way to trick the person or persons responsible for the 1854 murder of Michael Kiggin to return to the building. According to the rumor, police wanted them to believe the victim had survived, in hopes they would return to kill him and ultimately be arrested. At one point in the 1930s Oscar was stolen by pranksters and later found hanging from the Taft Bridge in Washington, D.C.

The Belle Haven Apartment House was converted into office space in 1981. One of the tenants, realtor Bud Jordan, found Oscar in the attic. He dressed it in one of his suits and placed it beside a lamp in the cupola. He later told a reporter "People used to stop and come into the office and say, you know there's a guy up there and he doesn't seem to be moving? I know that's my suit and tie and hat that we dressed him in. Real estate was down at the time because we had nothing better to do."

In 1992 the International Association of Chiefs of Police paid $3.1 million for the property and it served as their headquarters until 2014. During that time the cupola glass was repaired and Oscar was briefly removed from its perch. In late 2013 real estate development company CAS Riegler purchased the property for $5.2 million with plans to convert it into a 25-unit apartment building. The renovation of a historical building and contributing property to the Alexandria Historic District required approval from multiple organizations, including the Upper Old Town Design Advisory Committee, Alexandria Board of Architectural Review, and the National Park Service. The completed project, which included renaming the 25,950 square-foot (2,411 sq m) building to The Mill (also referred to as The Mill at 515), features one and two-bedroom apartments with 12-foot (3.7 m) high ceilings and original architectural details. There is an adjoining park and an event space on the top floor with views of Old Town Alexandria and the Potomac River.

CAS Riegler selected the Cooper Carry architectural firm to design the renovation project and the firm was told to treat Oscar with care. One of the architects working on the project, Brandon Lenk, said "The best way to put it is it was treated as though it was a historical aspect of the building." Lenk also noted Oscar was missing a leg and wearing faded clothing.

== See also ==
- National Register of Historic Places listings in Alexandria, Virginia
