= Alexandria Historic District =

National Historic Landmark District in Alexandria, Virginia, United States

- U.S. National Register of Historic Places
- U.S. National Historic Landmark District
- Virginia Landmarks Register
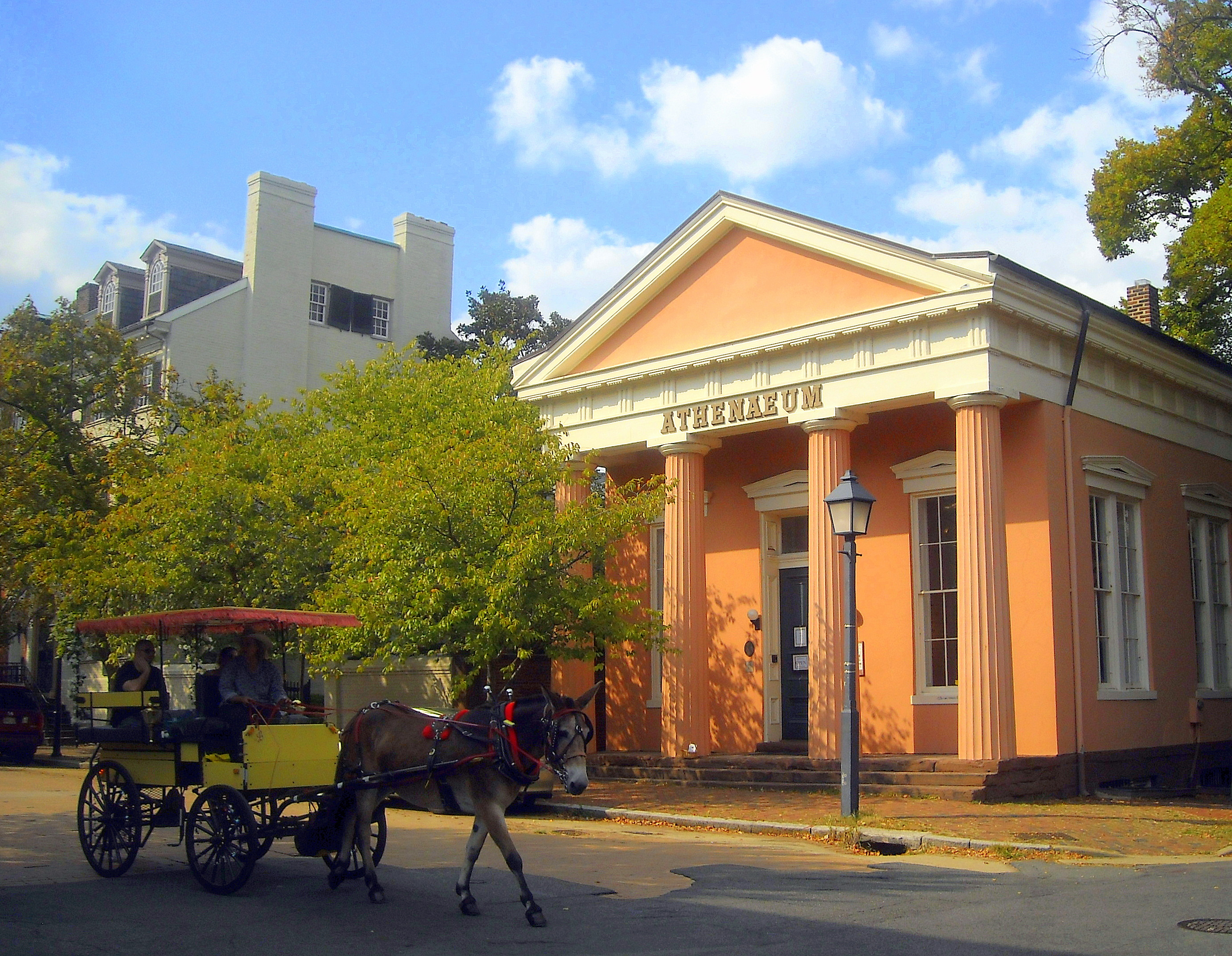
- Old Dominion Bank Building in Old Town, now "The Athenaeum", an art gallery
- Location: Alexandria, Virginia
- Coordinates: 38°48′12″N 77°2′47″W
- Built: 1748
- Architect: Multiple
- Architectural style: Colonial, Late Victorian, Federal
- NRHP reference No.: 66000928
- VLR No.: 100-0121

Significant dates
- Added to NRHP: November 13, 1966
- Designated NHLD: November 13, 1966
- Designated VLR: November 5, 1968

The Alexandria Historic District is a National Historic Landmark District in Alexandria, Virginia. Encompassing all of the city's Old Town and some adjacent areas, this area contains one of the nation's best-preserved assemblages of the late-18th and early-19th century urban architecture. The district was locally designated (as the Old and Historic Alexandria district) in 1946 and was declared a National Historic Landmark in 1966.

== History ==
The city of Alexandria was chartered in 1748, and its city center was laid out as a grid of streets on the west bank of the Potomac River. One of the surveyors involved in this work was future United States President George Washington. The city grew to become a major seaport serving much of northern Virginia, and its streets were lined with Federal style townhouses. The city remained a major port, dealing principally in grain and tobacco, until the American Civil War. Elements of its historic importance as a port continues in the survival of several waterfront warehouses from that period.

Other National Historic Landmarks within the district include:

- Christ Church
- Gadsby's Tavern Museum

Other National Register-listed properties within the district include:

- Bank of Alexandria
- Alexandria City Hall

The district boundaries, as defined by the National Register and the Virginia Landmarks Register, are the Potomac River to the east, Queen Street to the north, Jones Point and the Capital Beltway to the south, and Alfred Street to the west. There are a few extensions beyond these bounds, notably along Washington Street as far north as 2nd Street. The commercial center of the district is around S. Washington Street and King Street. Notable buildings in that area include the Art Deco Virginia Public Service building at 117 S. Washington Street, the Post Office and Courthouse at 200 S. Washington Street, and the Burke and Herbert Bank at 621 King Street. Within this larger district is a smaller historic district as defined by the National Historic Landmark designation, consisting of the central portion of the larger district.

== Gallery ==
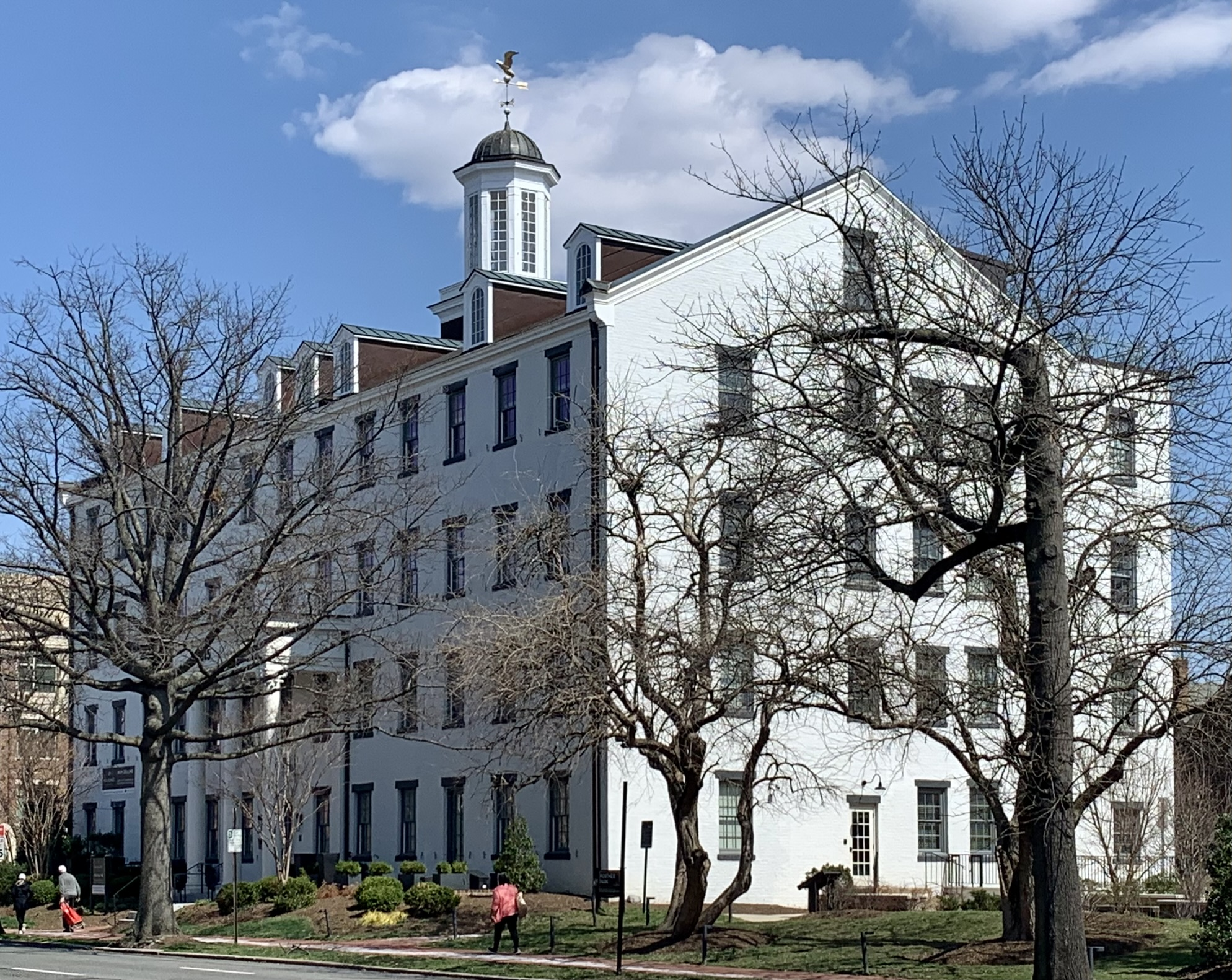
515 North Washington Street (1848)

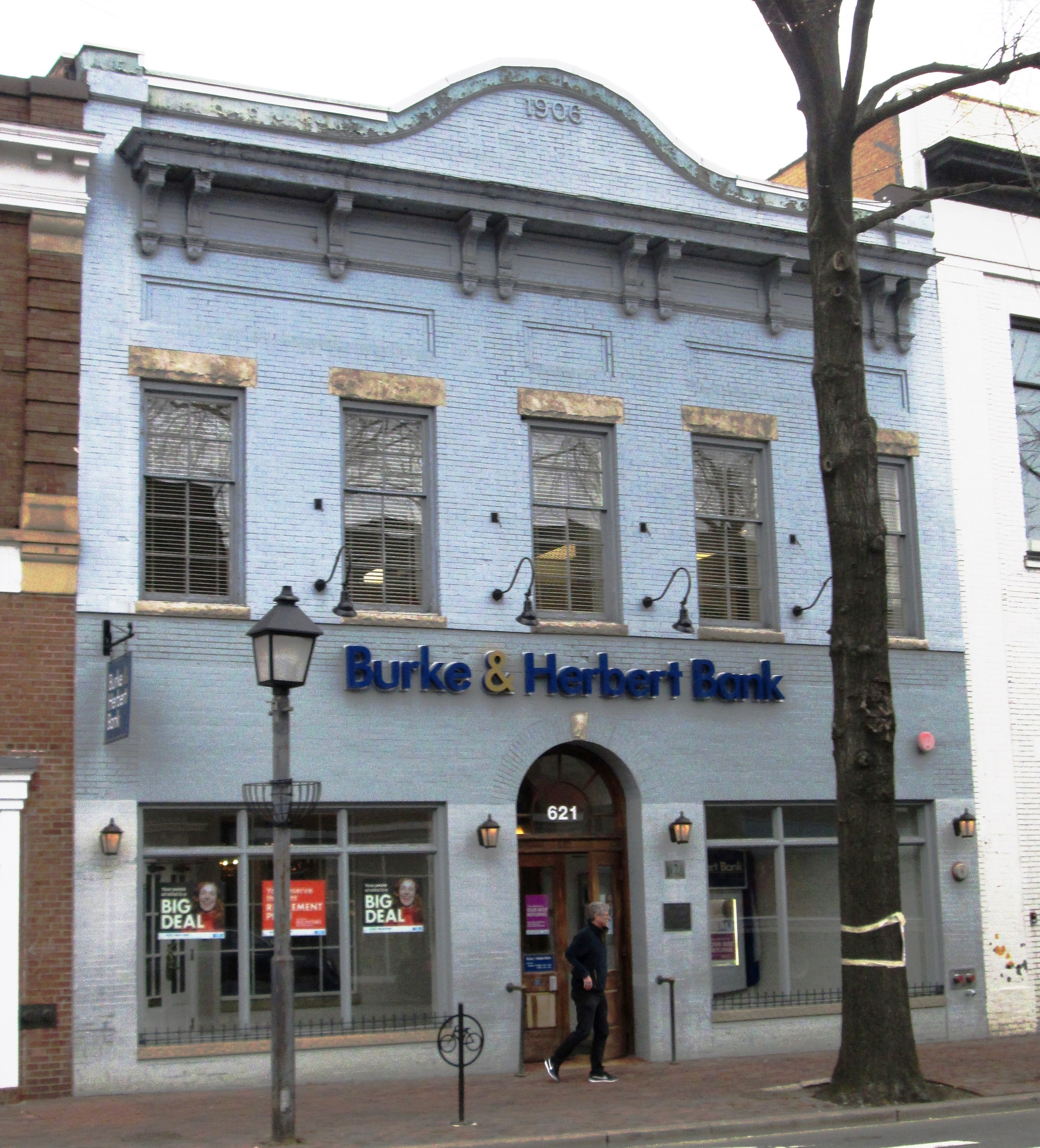
Burke & Herbert Bank at 621 King Street (1906)

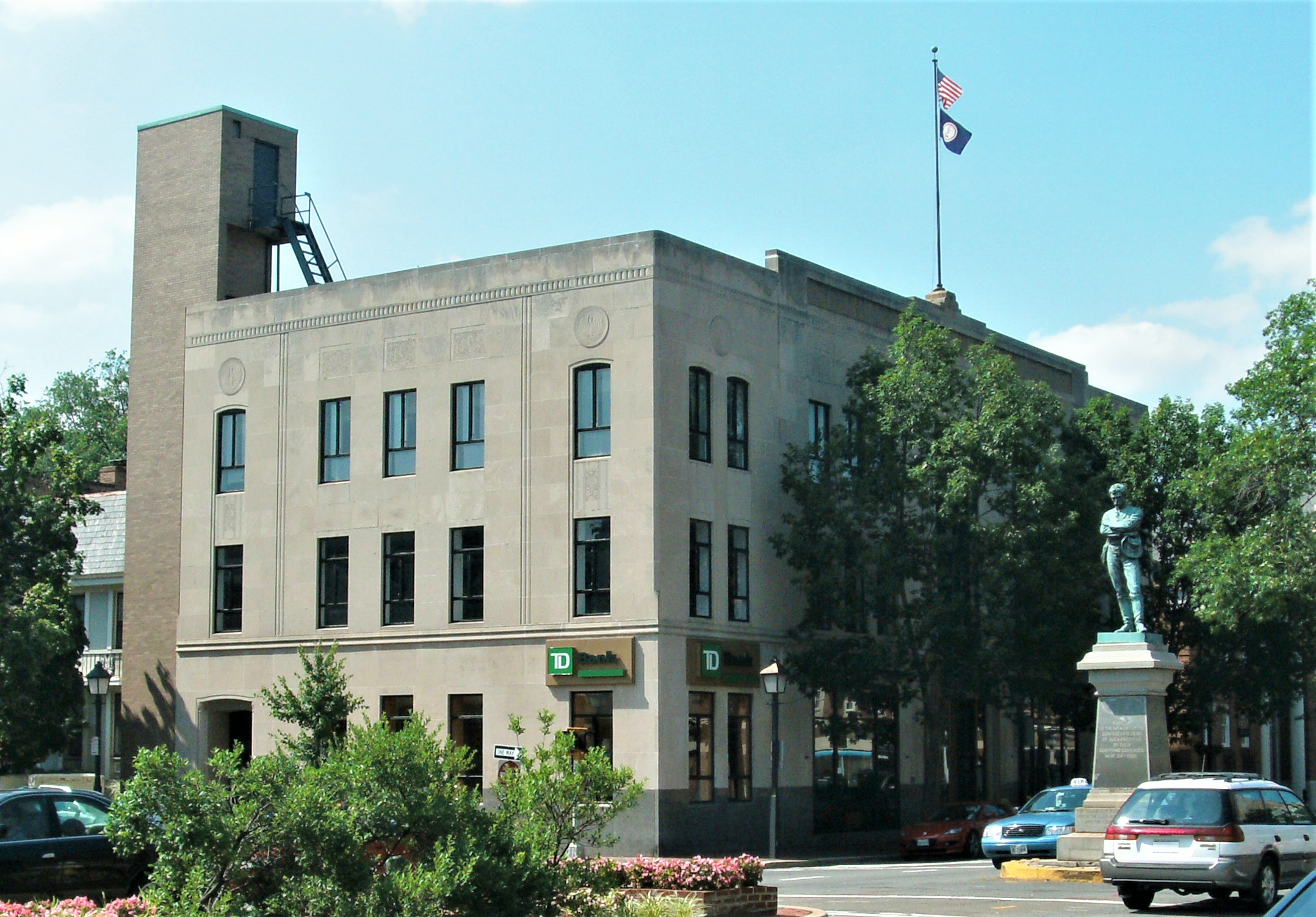
117 S. Washington St. (c.1930s)

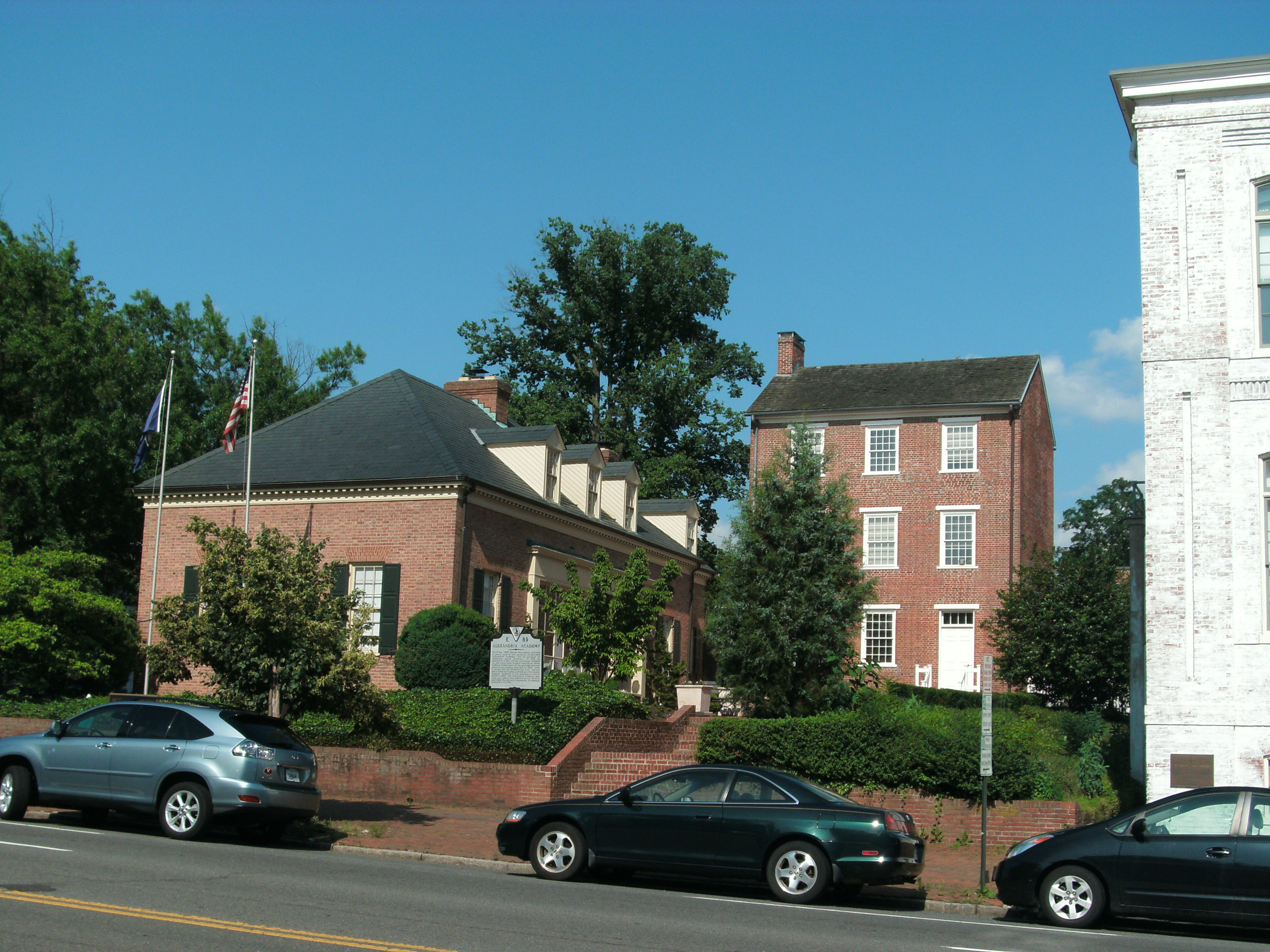
The Alexandria Academy

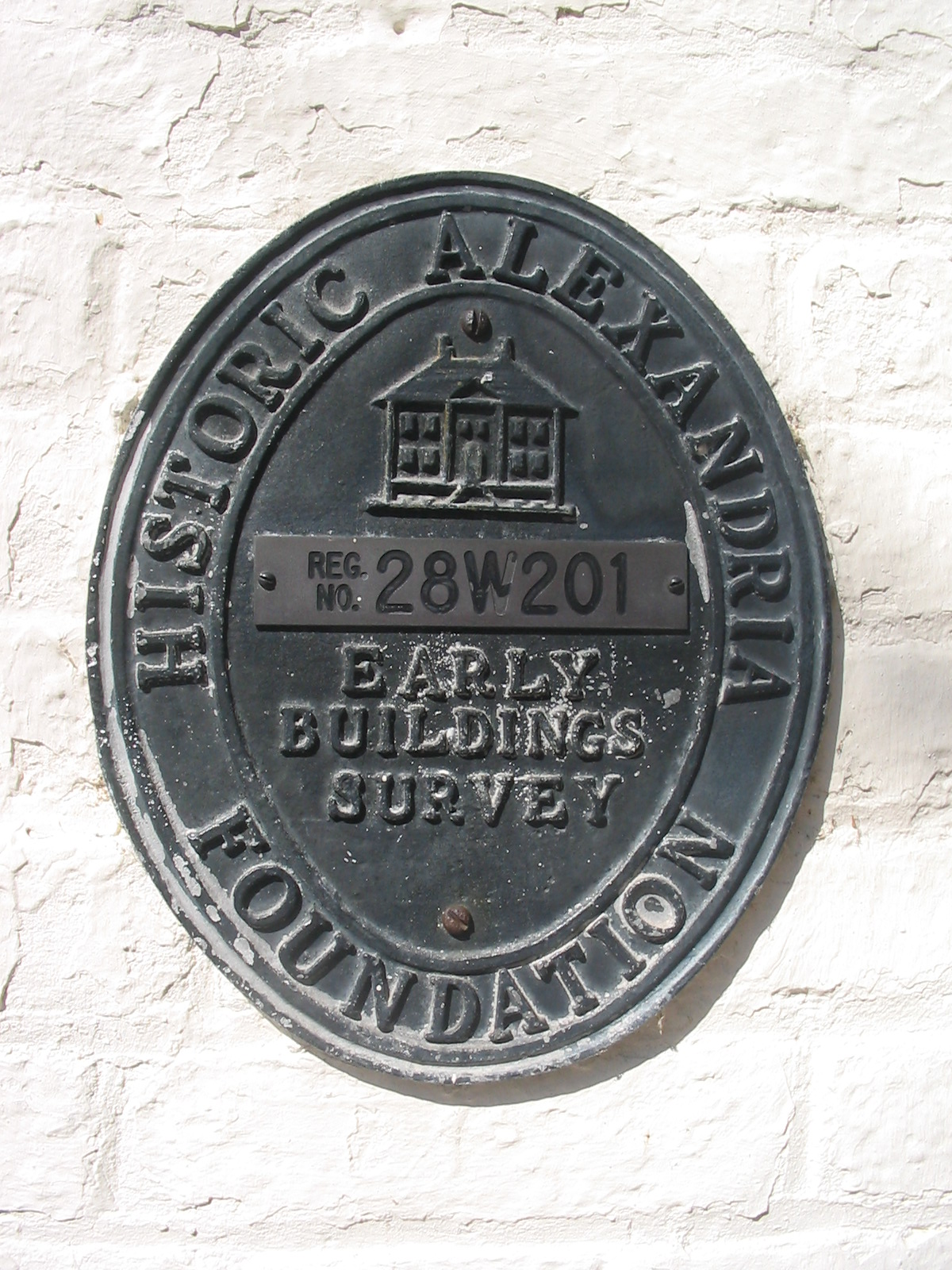
Roundel used to designate a historic building in Alexandria

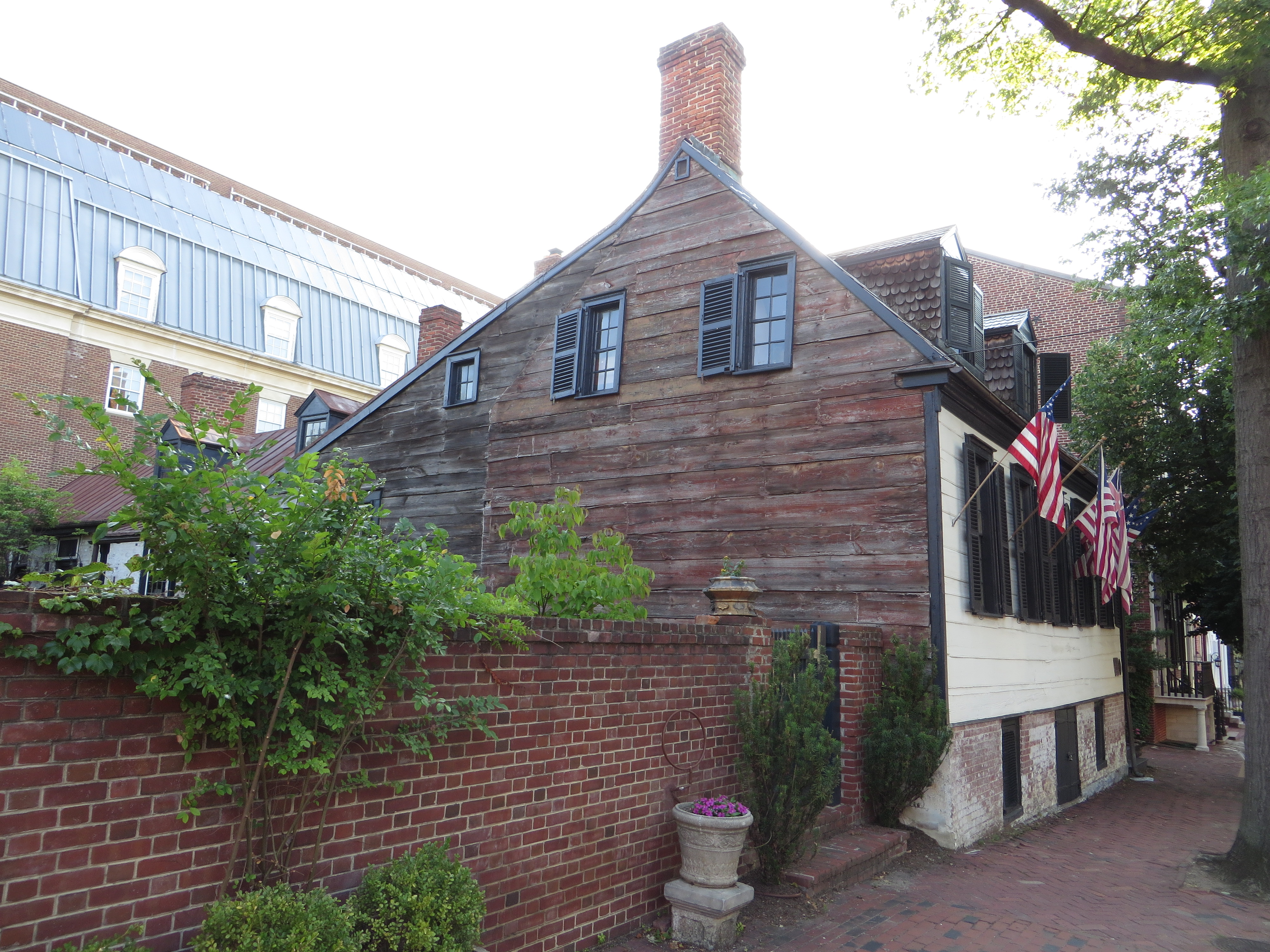
The Murray-Dick-Fawcett House (1772-1774)

== See also ==
- List of National Historic Landmarks in Virginia
- National Register of Historic Places listings in Alexandria, Virginia
