= Manassas Water Tower =

- U.S. National Register of Historic Places
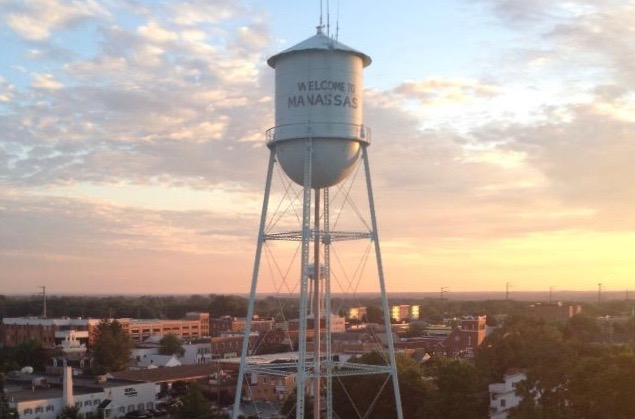

- Location within Northern Virginia Location within Virginia Location within the United States
- Location: 9000 Quarry St., Manassas, Virginia
- Coordinates: 38°45′10″N 77°28′10″W
- Area: less than one acre
- Built: 1914
- NRHP reference No.: 16000533
- Added to NRHP: August 15, 2016

The Manassas Water Tower is a historic water storage facility at 9000 Quarry Street in Manassas, Virginia. It is a steel structure 147 feet (45 m) in height, and is typical in style for its 1914 construction date, with a steel trestle supporting a tank with a hemispherical base and conical roof. It has a capacity of 75,000 US gallons (280,000 L; 62,000 imp gal). It was built near one of the city's six water wells, and is one of six water towers in the state with a hemispherical bottom. It is also the oldest water tower in the region.

It was added to the National Register of Historic Places in 2016.

== See also ==
- National Register of Historic Places listings in Manassas, Virginia
