= Cannon Branch Fort =

- U.S. National Register of Historic Places
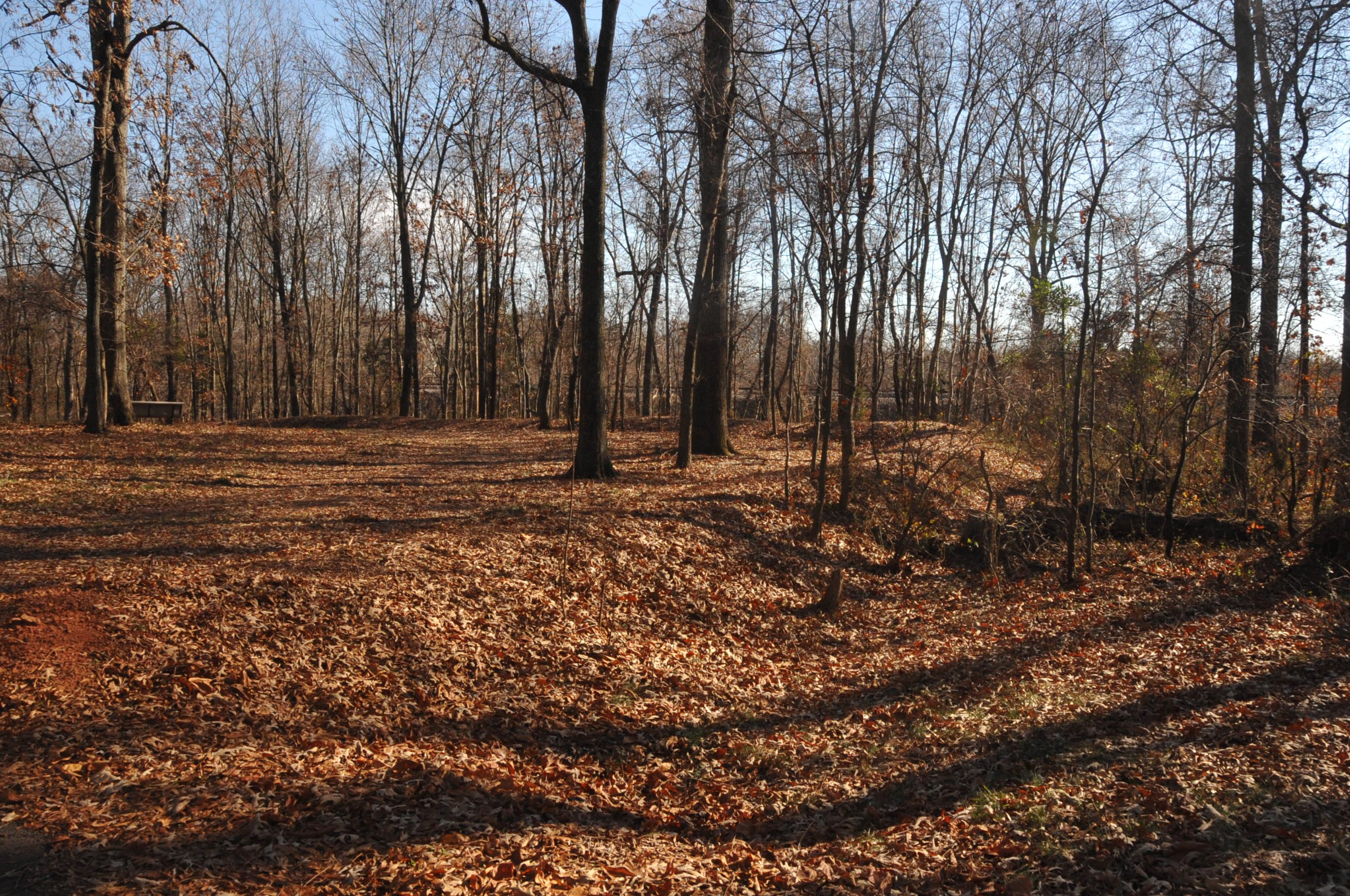

- Location within Northern Virginia Location within Virginia Location within the United States
- Nearest city: Manassas, Virginia
- Coordinates: 38.736076°N 77.516788°W
- Area: 10.9 acres (4.4 ha)
- MPS: Civil War Properties in Prince William County MPS
- NRHP reference No.: 99001004
- Added to NRHP: August 26, 1999

The Cannon Branch Fort is a historic American Civil War fortification at 10611 Gateway Boulevard in Manassas, Virginia. Details of the exact time and circumstances of its construction are not known; it is believed to have been built by Union Army forces in 1863 or 1864 to defend the nearby railroad lines.

The site was listed on the National Register of Historic Places in 1999. It is now a city park.
