= Mayfield Fortification =

Coordinates: 38.753°N 77.452°W

- Mayfield Fortification (44PW226)
- U.S. National Register of Historic Places
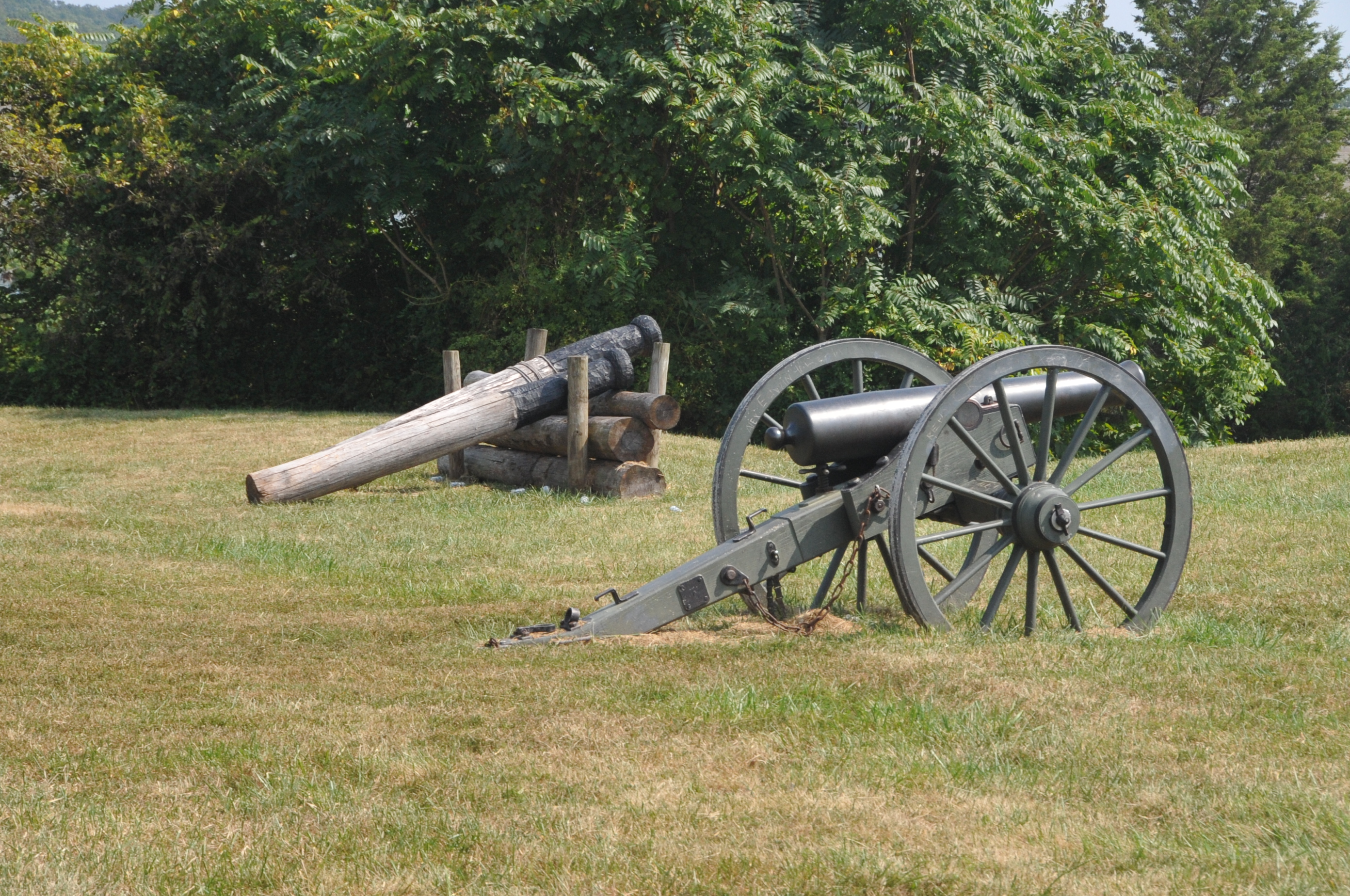

- Location within Northern Virginia Location within Virginia Location within the United States
- Nearest city: Manassas, Virginia
- Area: less than one acre
- Built: 1861
- MPS: Civil War Properties in Prince William County MPS
- NRHP reference No.: 89001063
- Added to NRHP: August 8, 1989

The Mayfield Fortification is a historic American Civil War earthworks at 8401 Quarry Road in Manassas, Virginia. It is one of a series of fortifications constructed by the Confederate Army to defend the critical Manassas railroad junction in 1861. The fort consisted of earthworks with log revetments, and was built by local Confederate troops and slave labor. After 1862 the fort was sporadically occupied by Union forces.

The site was listed on the National Register of Historic Places in 1989. It is now a city park.

== See also ==
- National Register of Historic Places listings in Manassas, in Manassas Park, and in Prince William County, Virginia
