= Old Town Manassas =

- Manassas Historic District
- U.S. National Register of Historic Places
- U.S. Historic district
- Virginia Landmarks Register
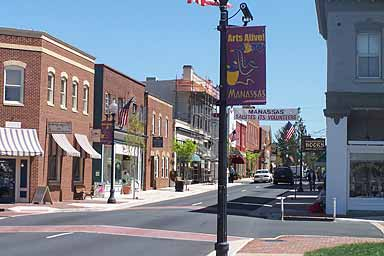
- Old Town Manassas, November 2006

- Location within Northern Virginia Location within Virginia Location within the United States
- Location: Roughly bounded by Quarry Rd., Prescott and Fairview Aves., the former Southern railroad line, and Grant Ave., Manassas, Virginia
- Coordinates: 38°45′11″N 77°28′16″W
- Area: 93 acres (38 ha)
- Architect: Speiden, Albert; Et al.
- Architectural style: Late 19th And 20th Century Revivals, Late Victorian
- NRHP reference No.: 88000747
- VLR No.: 155-0161

Significant dates
- Added to NRHP: June 29, 1988
- Designated VLR: February 16, 1988

Old Town Manassas, or the Manassas Historic District, is a national historic district located at Manassas, Virginia. It encompasses 206 contributing buildings and 1 contributing object in the central business district and surrounding residential area of city of Manassas.

== Historic designation ==
The Manassas Historic District was added to the National Register of Historic Places in 1988.

== Residential areas ==
Residential areas include dwellings in a variety of popular late-19th and early-20th century architectural styles. These range from Italianate, Second Empire and Queen Anne styles, to the Craftsman and American Foursquare styles.

== Notable buildings ==
Notable buildings include the former Manassas Presbyterian Church (1875); the former All Saints Roman Catholic Church (1878); the Sillington, Hazen Building, formerly the National Bank of Manassas (1896); the former Hopkins Candy Factory (1908-1909); the old Manassas Town Hall; the Trinity Episcopal Church (1922); the Grace Methodist Church (1926); and the Norfolk-Southern Railway passenger station (1914). Also located in the district is the separately listed Prince William County Courthouse. Associated with the courthouse is the contributing monument commemorating the Peace Jubilee (1911).

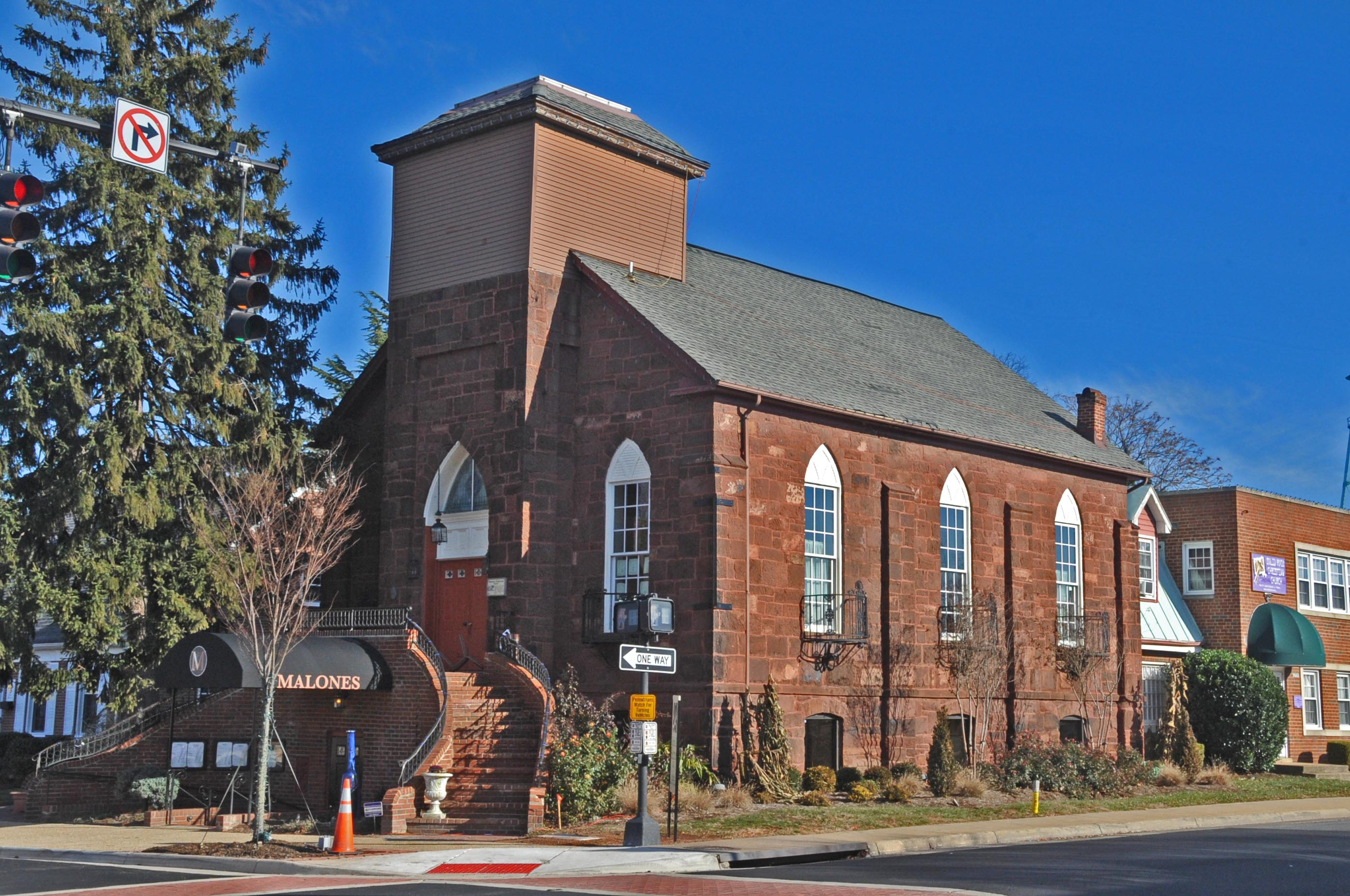
Church featured in the 1952 film My Son John

== Manassas Museum ==
Located in Old Town Manassas is the Manassas Museum. Inspired by a small museum in Strasburg Virginia, lifelong resident, Walser Rohr suggested the town assemble artifacts for display in a trial museum. The exhibit opened for the centennial celebrations in 1973 and was a success. Since 1991, the museum has increased exhibit spaces to include interactive displays and educational offerings for all ages that explore the city's rich history.
