= Liberia (Manassas, Virginia) =

Historic house in Virginia, United States

- U.S. National Register of Historic Places
- Virginia Landmarks Register
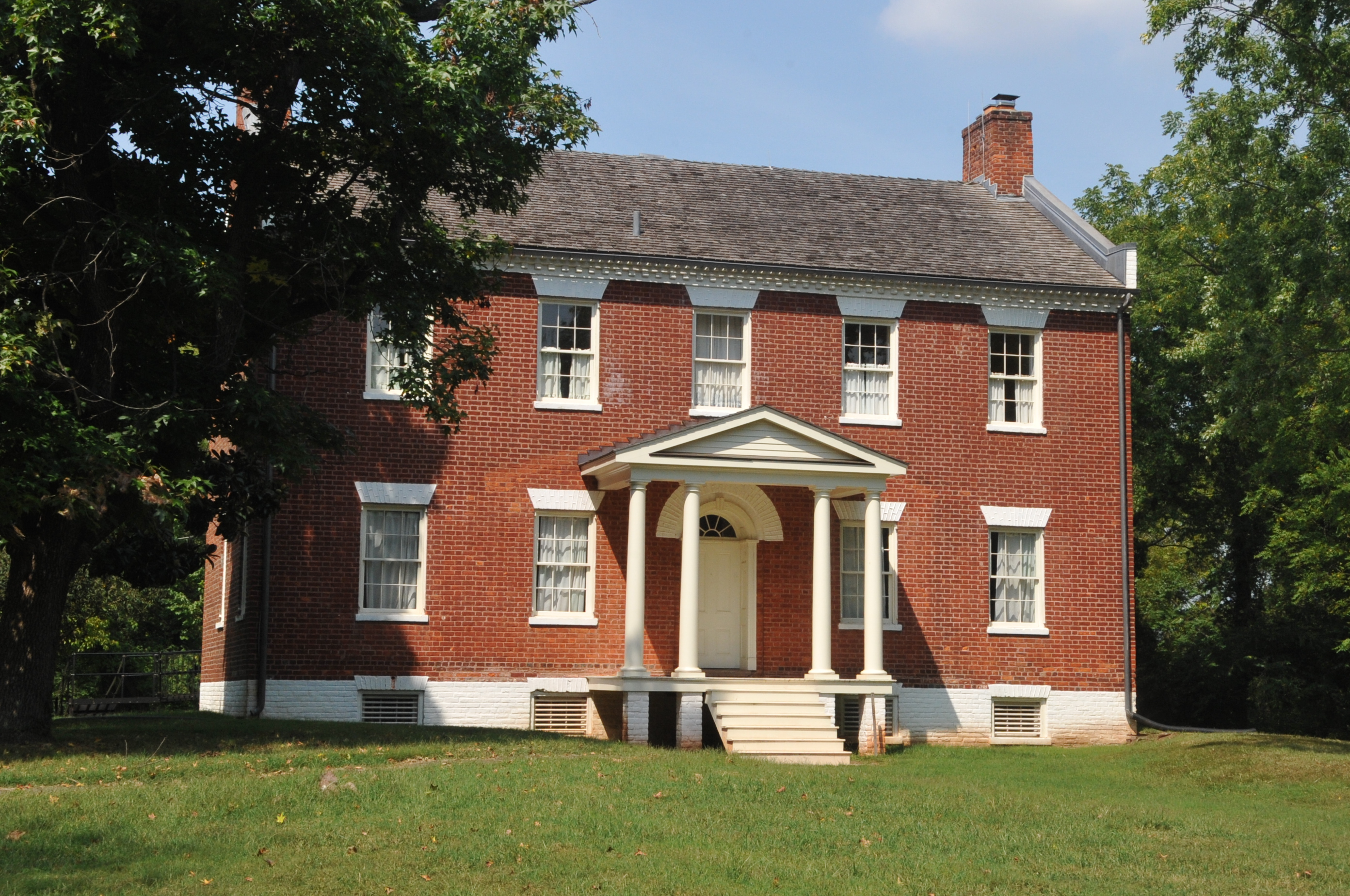
- Liberia, March 2007

- Location within Northern Virginia Location within Virginia Location within the United States
- Location: 8601 Portner Ave, Manassas, Virginia
- Coordinates: 38°45′58″N 77°27′38″W
- Area: 52 acres (21 ha)
- Built: 1825
- Architectural style: Federal
- NRHP reference No.: 80004215
- VLR No.: 155-0001

Significant dates
- Added to NRHP: March 20, 1980
- Designated VLR: December 18, 1978, February 15, 2007

Liberia is a historic plantation house located at Manassas, Virginia, United States. It was built about 1825, and is a two-story, five-bay, Federal style brick dwelling. It has a parapet side-gable roof and a molded brick cornice with a saw-tooth design. It has a single-pile, modified central passage plan. During the American Civil War, it was used as headquarters by both Confederate and Union forces. Both Presidents Abraham Lincoln and Jefferson Davis, in addition to other statesmen, visited Liberia during the War.

The house was acquired by the City of Manassas on December 31, 1986, for use as a museum. The house is being restored and is open for special events and tours by appointment.

It was added to the National Register of Historic Places in 1980.
