= Old Town Alexandria =

Neighborhood in Virginia, US

Coordinates: 38°48′10″N 77°2′40″W

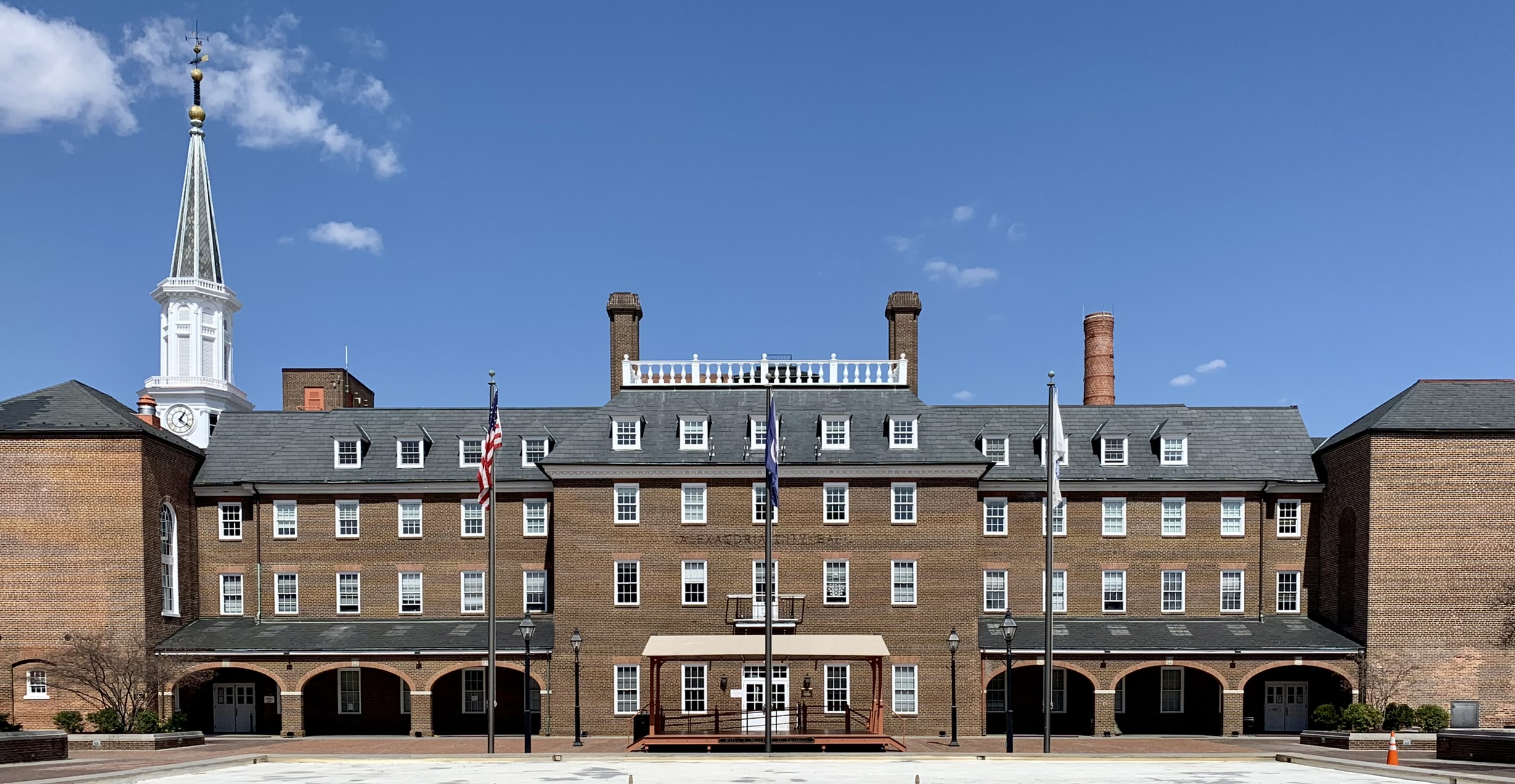
- Alexandria City Hall in 2022
- Interactive map of Old Town Alexandria
- Named for: Philip Alexander II and John Alexander

Population (2020)
  - Total: 11,872
- Demonym: Old Towner / Alexandrian
- Time zone: EST
- Area code: 703

Old Town Alexandria is one of the original settlements of the city of Alexandria, Virginia, and is located about 8 miles (13 km) from the United States Capitol. It lies across the Potomac River from Washington, D.C., of which it used to make up the far southern part. It was the oldest district of D.C. until it was ceded back to Virginia in 1846. Old Town is situated in the eastern and southeastern area of Alexandria along the Potomac River and is laid out on a grid plan of substantially square blocks.

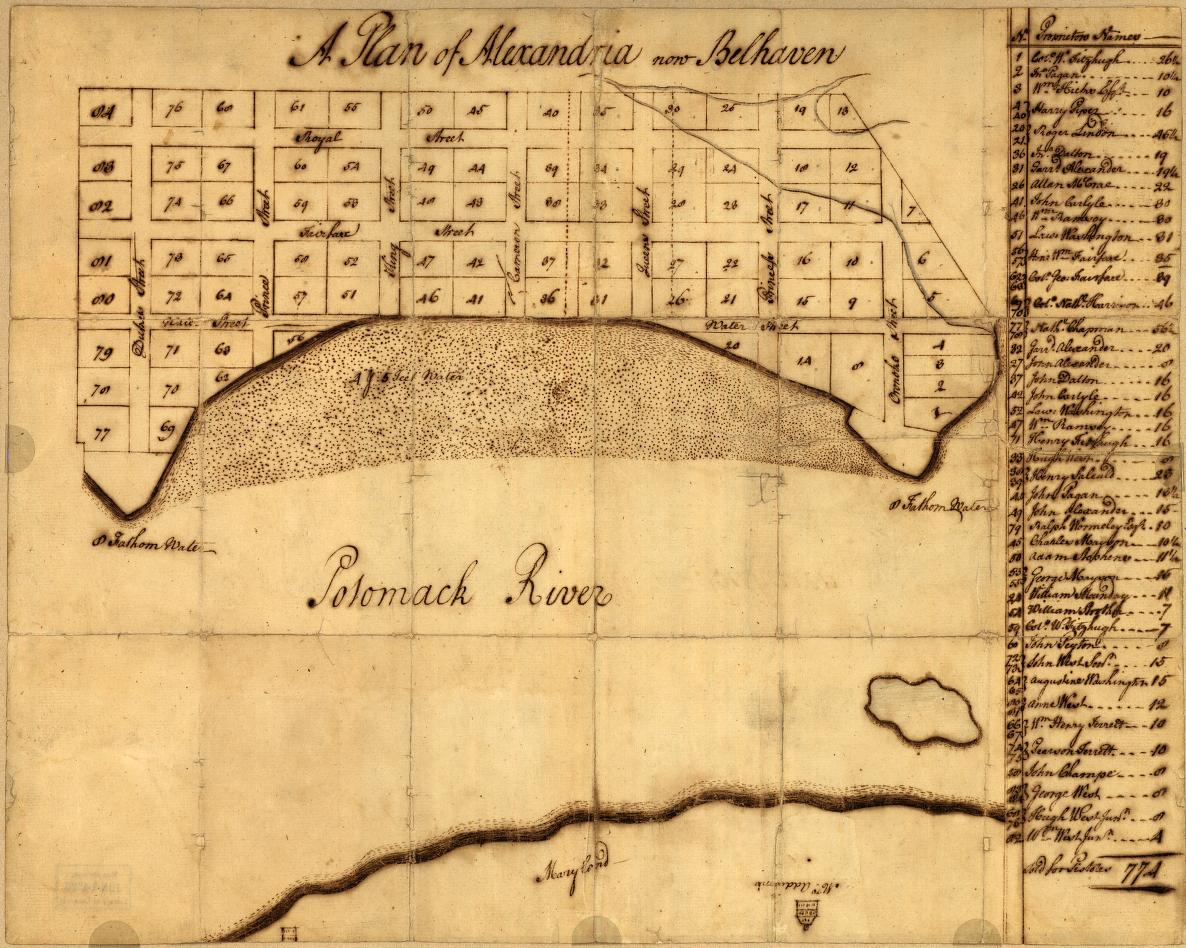
Old Town Alexandria’s grid plan as drawn by surveyor George Washington, c. 1749

== Etymology ==
The area was originally called Belhaven, believed to be in honor of a Scottish patriot, John Hamilton, 2nd Lord Belhaven and Stenton. The town was formally named Alexandria in 1779, after Captain Philip Alexander II (1704–1753) and Captain John Alexander (1711–1763), who donated the land to assist in the development of the area.

== History ==
Much of the land on which Alexandria now sits on was part of a land grant from Sir William Berkeley who was the governor of Virginia. The land was awarded to the English ship captain Robert Howson. Shortly after the land was sold to John Alexander for 6,000 pounds (2,700 kg) of tobacco. By 1732, Philip and John Alexander farmed much of the surrounding area. Alexandria become a major trade hub and was incorporated in 1789. Alexandria was known as the "Port City" of the Potomac and was one of the largest ports in the country by 1790.

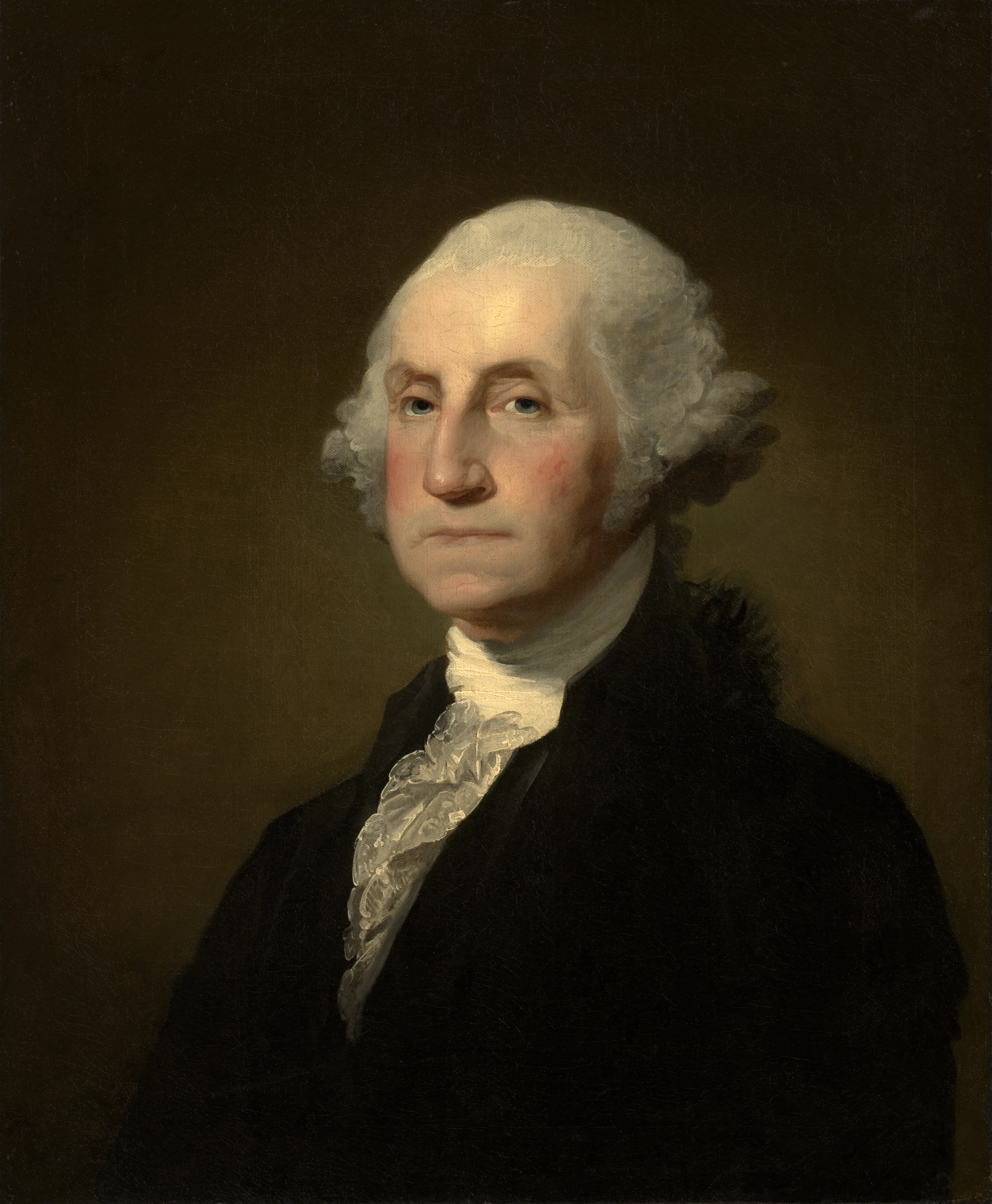
George Washington was a Town Trustee, philanthropist, and resident.

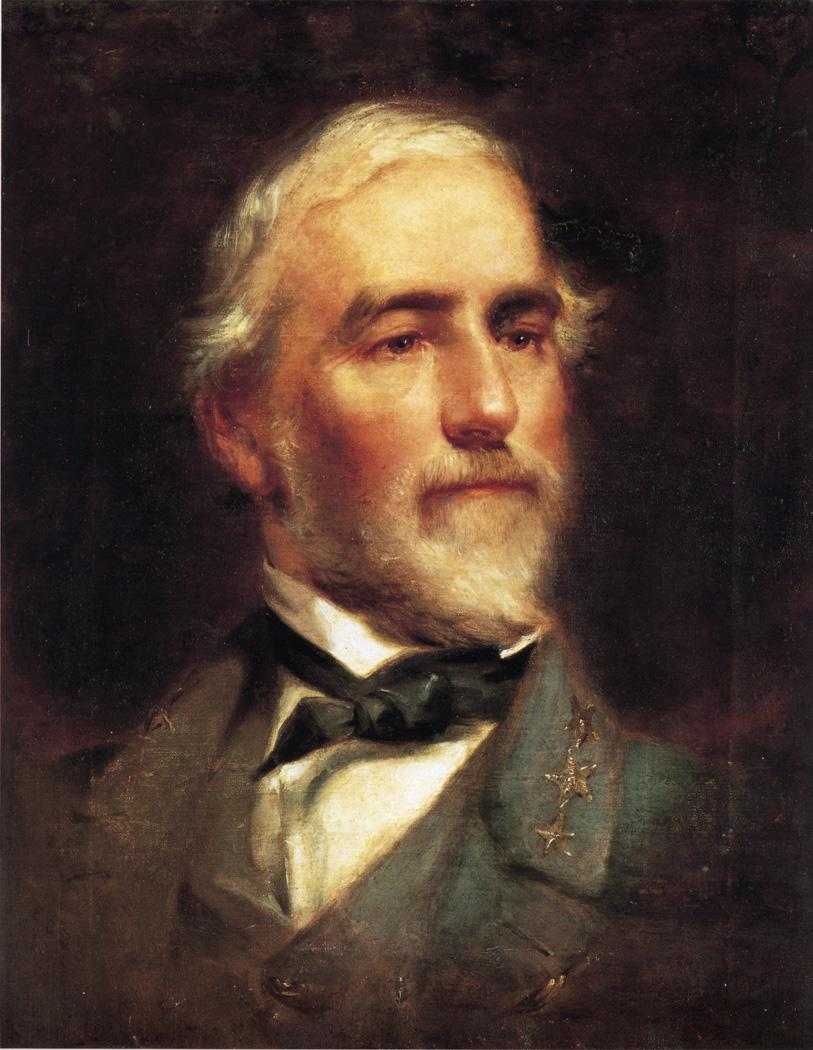
Robert E. Lee grew up in Old Town and, just as Washington did, attended Christ Church.

The town was originally laid out in 1749, making it the oldest section of the city, and is a historic district. On July 9, 1790, Congress passed the Residence Act, which approved the creation of a national capital on the Potomac River, formed from land donated by the states of Maryland and Virginia, two pre-existing settlements were included in the territory: the port of Georgetown, Maryland, founded in 1751, and the port city of Alexandria, Virginia, founded in 1749. George Washington conducted most of his business in Old Town, as it was a short trip from Mount Vernon. He was a Town Trustee and owned a house in town that he would use when working late or for extended periods of time. When Washington was 14, he surveyed some of the streets in Old Town. Washington donated money to his church, Christ Church, and money to found the first Catholic Church in Virginia, Saint Mary's. Both churches still exist, but Saint Mary's was moved closer to a central area of the town. The former location of Saint Mary's is now a Catholic school and graveyard. Robert E. Lee grew up in Old Town Alexandria after his father could no longer afford for them to stay at Stratford Hall. Lee also attended Christ Church and later moved to the nearby Arlington House after marrying into George Washington's family.

Market Square in Old Town is believed to be one of the oldest continuously operating marketplaces in the United States (since 1753), and, during colonial times, was the site of a slave market. Today it contains a large fountain, extensive landscaping, and a farmers' market each Saturday morning. Alexandria City Hall, including the mayor's office, is adjacent to Market Square.

In the 1830s Alexandria's citizens petitioned Virginia to take back the land it had donated to form the district, through a process known as retrocession. The Virginia General Assembly voted in February 1846 to accept the return of Alexandria. On July 9, 1846, Congress agreed to return all the territory that Virginia had ceded.

A statue of a lone Confederate soldier that marked the spot at which Confederate States of America (CSA) units from Alexandria left to join the Confederate Army at the beginning of the American Civil War stood in the center of the intersection of Washington and Prince streets for 131 years until June 2, 2020. M. Casper Buberl cast the piece, entitled Appomattox, in 1889. The United Daughters of the Confederacy, which owns the statue, had the monument removed because vandals had recently damaged other segregation-era statues during nationwide demonstrations.

Old Town is chiefly known for its historic town houses, art galleries, antique shops, and restaurants as well as its unique cobblestone streets and red brick sidewalks.

Some of the historic landmarks in Old Town include:

- Carlyle House

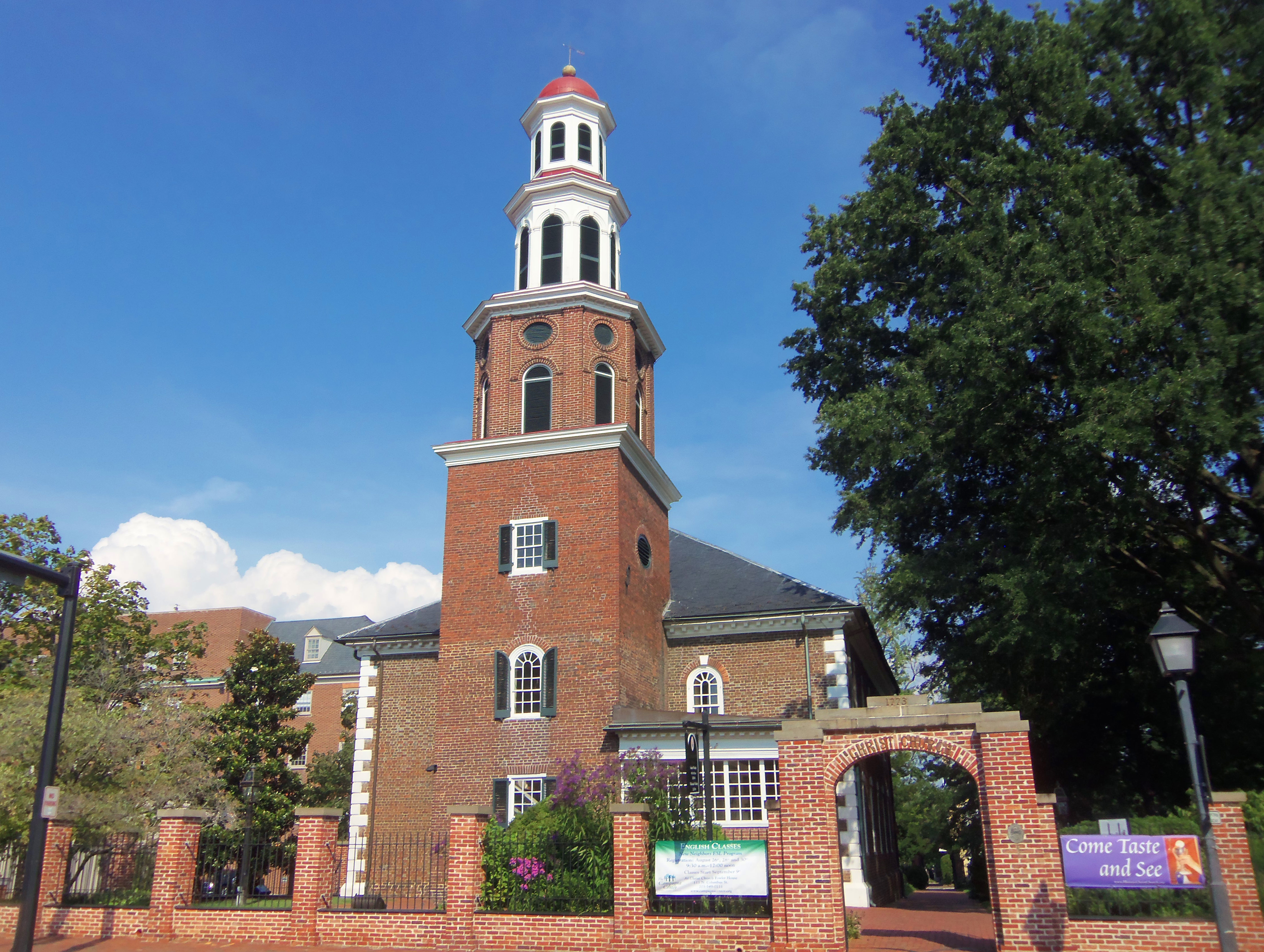
Christ Church is a historic church whose congregation has included notable individuals, such as George Washington and Robert E. Lee.

- Christ Church
- Robert E. Lee's houses: His boyhood home and the Lee-Fendall House.
- Gadsby's Tavern,
- Stabler-Leadbeater Apothecary Shop,
- Hollensbury Spite House,
- Shiloh Baptish Church
- Saint Mary's Basilica (the first Catholic church in Virginia)
- Athenaeum
- Lyceum
- Vowell-Smith House
- The Torpedo Factory art studio complex
- A replica of George Washington's townhouse

The Washington Metro’s King Street station opened in 1983. It led to a spurt of new hotel and office building developments in western Old Town, and gentrification of townhouse areas west of Washington Street which were previously an African-American community.

=== Athenaeum ===
The Athenaeum is one of only two of Alexandria's surviving examples one Greek revival architecture. The building stands out because of its four large doric columns and pink paint. It was built in 1852 as a bank. Robert E. Lee was a patron of this bank when he was in Old Town.During the Civil War, it was a Union office. After the war it was an apothecary, factory, and church. In 1964 the Northern Virginia Fine Arts Association (NVFAA) bought the building and repurposed it as the Athenaeum.

=== Alexandria Archaeology Museum ===
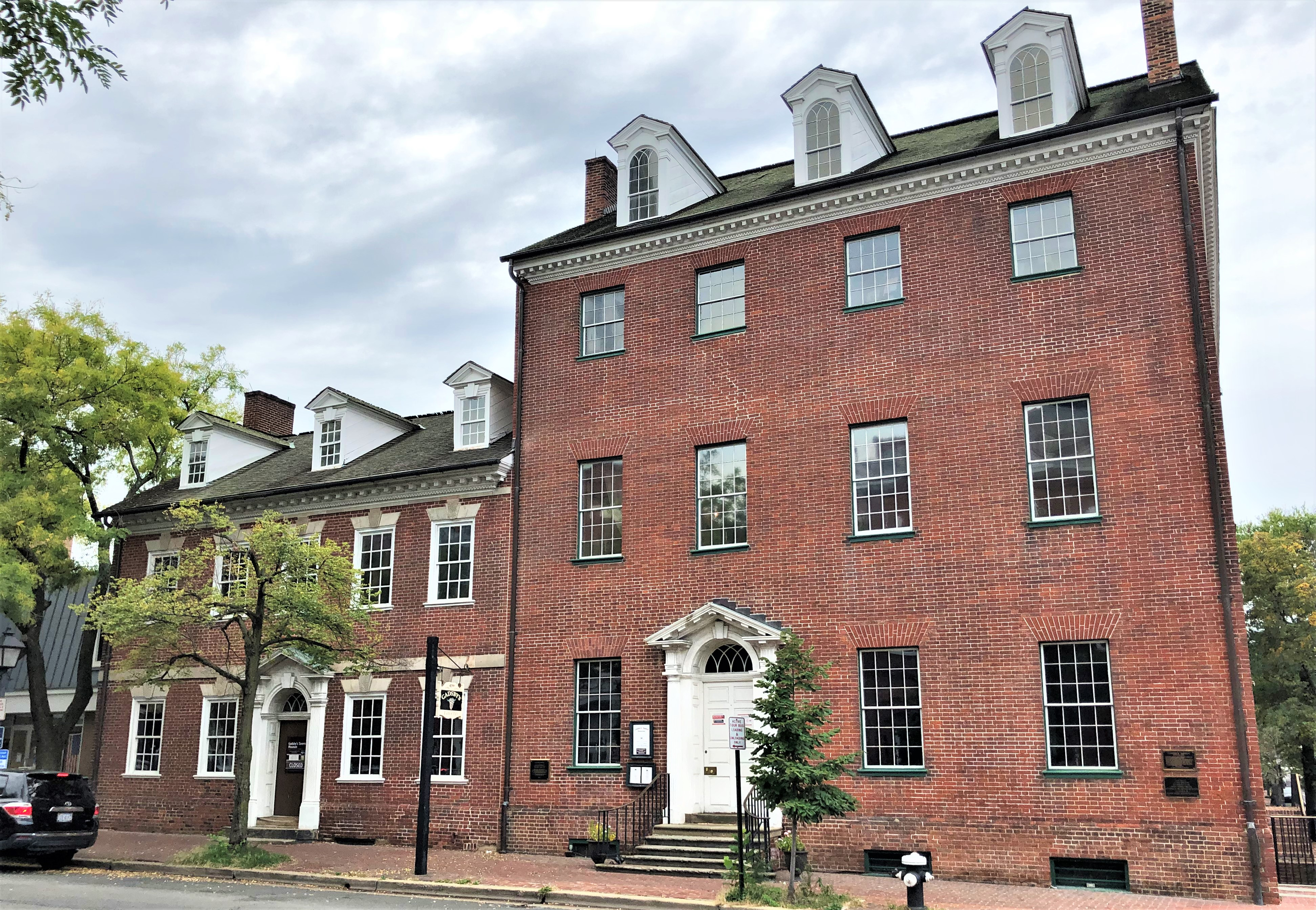
The historic Gadsby's Tavern located at the corner of North Royal Street and Cameron Street

Alexandria Archaeology Museum is an institution dedicated to preserve and study Alexandria, Virginia's archaeological heritage and foster within residents and visitors a connection between the past and present, inspiring a sense of stewardship and adventure. The museum and its laboratory are located on the third floor of the Torpedo Factory Art Center, at 105 N. Union Street in historic Old Town Alexandria, Virginia.

=== Historic Alexandria Foundation ===
Founded in 1954, the Historic Alexandria Foundation is dedicated to reserving Old Town with preservation grants, restoration work, plaques, and recognition grants. HAF has been credited with saving hundreds of buildings in Old Town.

== Commerce ==
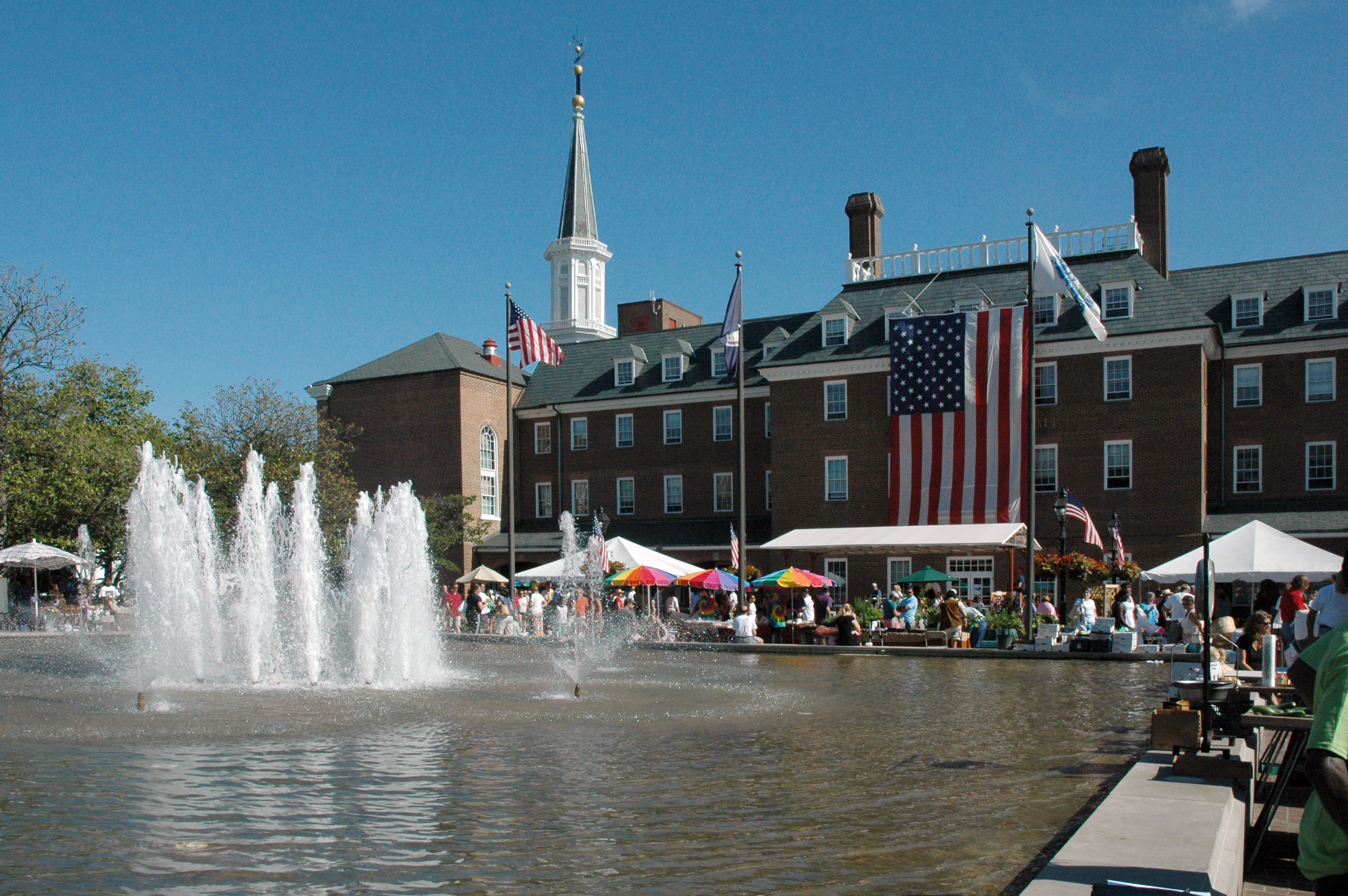
Fountain and farmers' market in the Market Square, 2007.

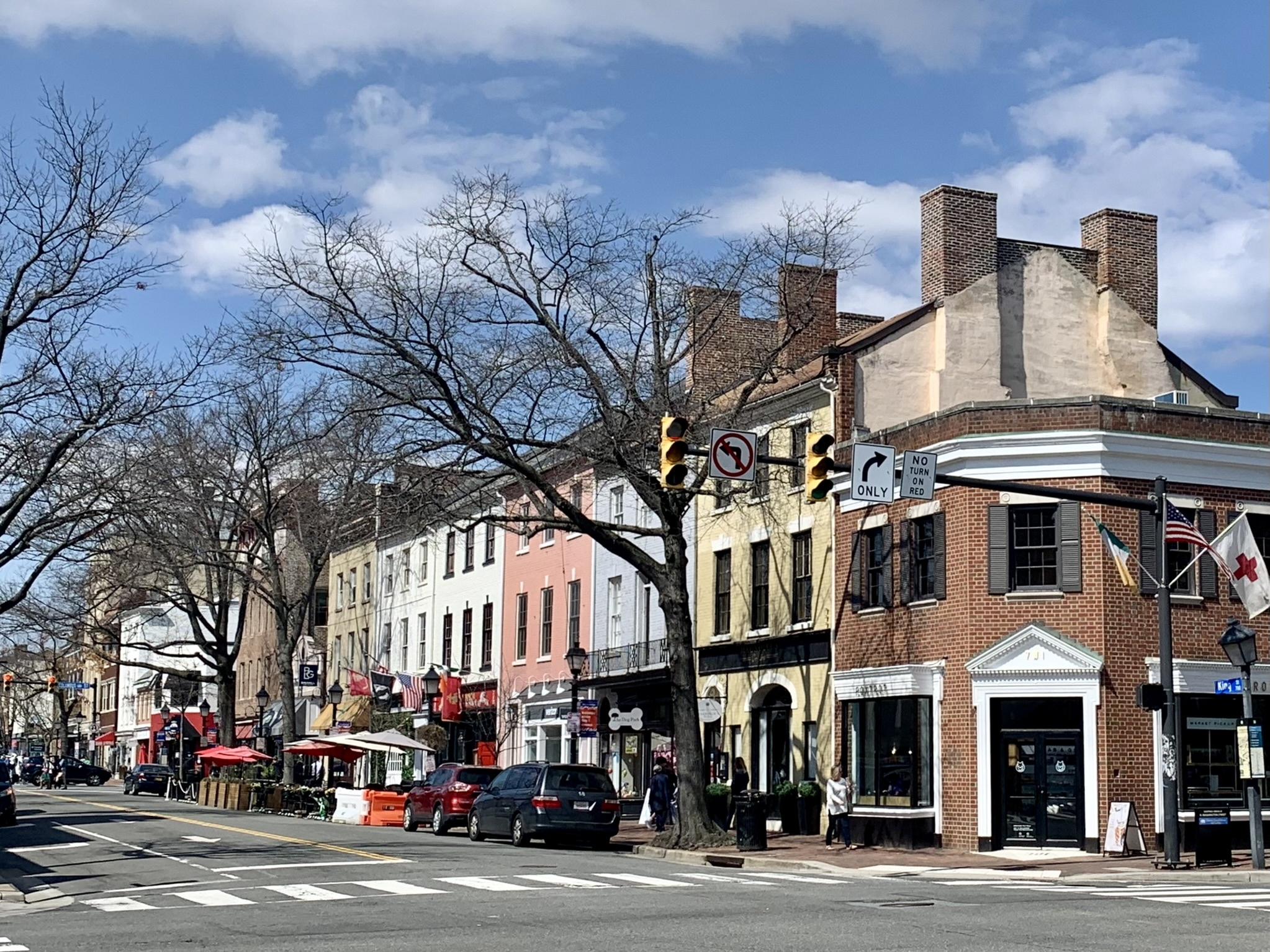
King Street is the major commercial street that runs through the center of Old Town.

Market Square in Old Town is believed to be one of the oldest continuously operating marketplaces in the United States (since 1753), and, during colonial times, was the site of a slave market. Today it contains a large fountain, extensive landscaping, and a farmers' market each Saturday morning. Alexandria City Hall, including the mayor's office, is adjacent to Market Square.

The King street corridor, which starts at the foot of the George Washington Masonic Memorial, and runs directly east until arriving at the west bank of the Potomac River, is where most of Old Town's commercial footprint lies. The street is lined on both sides with stores, restaurants, and bars, many of which are independent establishments.

== Transportation ==
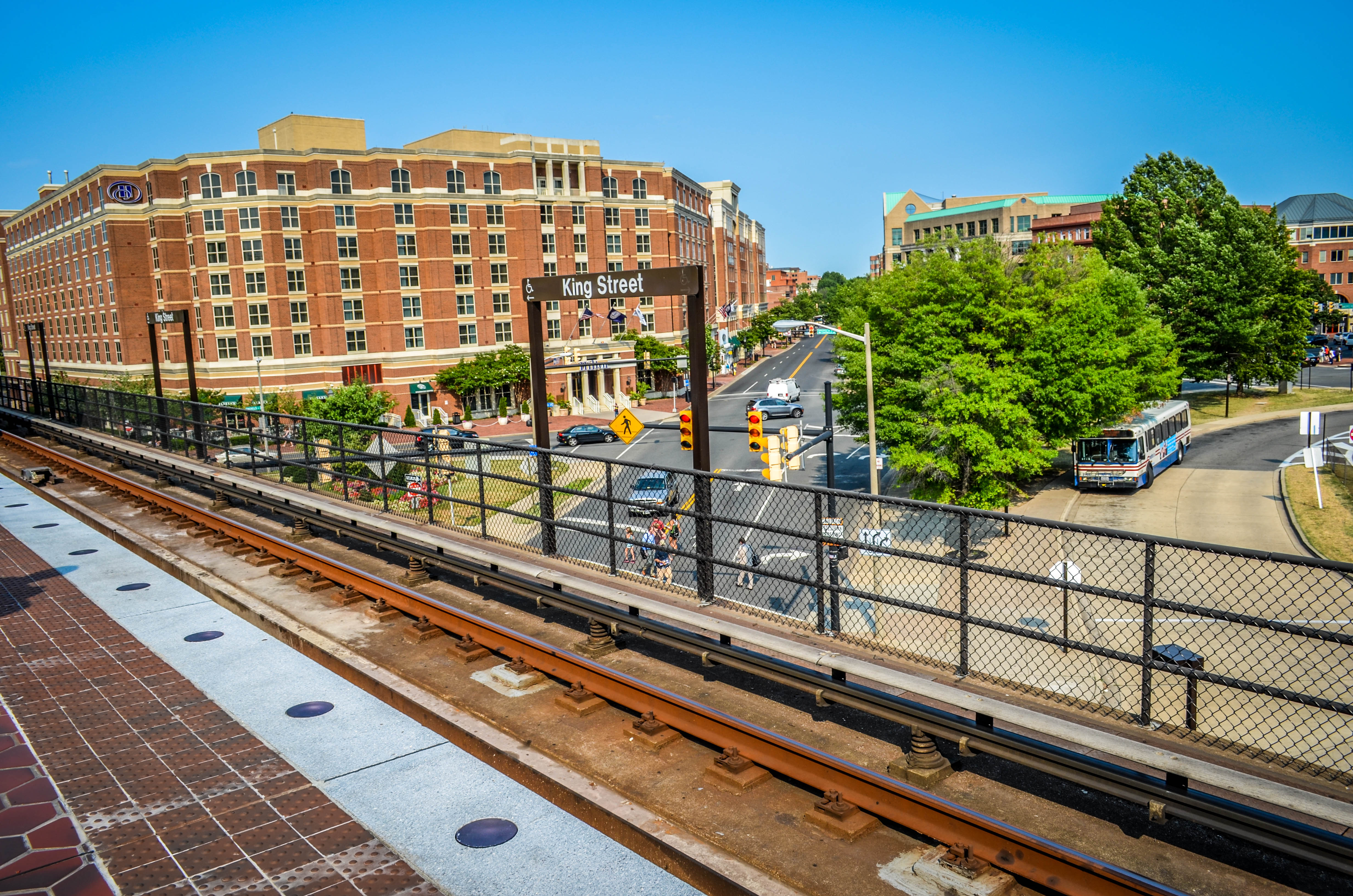
King Street-Old Town Station on the Washington Metro

- The Washington Metro’s King Street station connects Alexandria with other locations in Virginia, Maryland, and Washington, D.C. At the station are located bay stations for all the buses that operate in the city. Parts of Old Town are walkable from the Metro’s Braddock Road station.
- A free trolley bus with information of the historic places through speakers while the passengers ride on it.
- River cruise boats and street entertainers frequent the large plaza at the foot of King Street; the Mount Vernon Trail also passes through.
- Sailing and fishing is common on the Potomac.

== Media ==
The main independent media company in Alexandria is The Zebra, an ‘all good news’ company that publishes a free monthly paper magazine with local news and events, a website and a YouTube TV channel called Z-TV. The newspaper is called the Old Town Crier and was established in 1988.Their motto is "from the Bay to the Blue Ridge." The Crier began as a community paper that promoted the history and lifestyle of Old Town, but it has gradually become a regional source for general news.

== Monuments ==
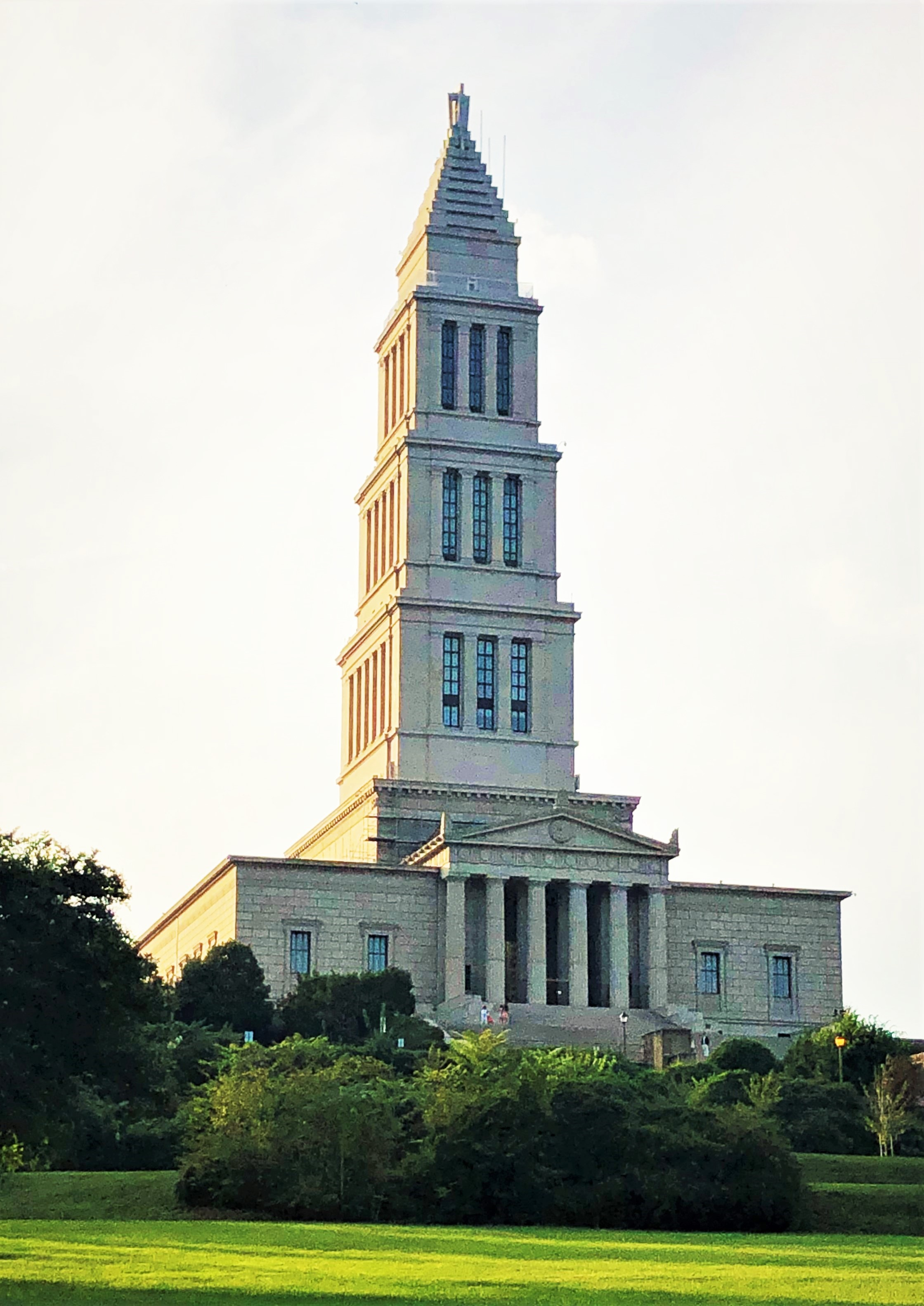
The George Washington Masonic National Memorial overlooks Old Town

The George Washington Masonic National Memorial, which was built to honor the first president of the United States and former resident of Alexandria, George Washington, was completed in 1932. The memorial is located on the very northern edge of Old Town. Much of Alexandria and parts of Washington, D.C. are viewable from the memorial.

Appomattox is a statue cast by M. Casper Buberl in 1889. It is a statue of a lone Confederate soldier that marked the spot at which Confederate States of America (CSA) units from Alexandria left to join the Confederate Army at the beginning of the American Civil War. The statue stood in the center of the intersection of Washington and Prince streets for 131 years, until June 2, 2020. The United Daughters of the Confederacy, which owns the statue, had the monument removed because vandals had recently damaged other segregation-era statues during nationwide demonstrations.

== Events ==
In Old Town, the following events are often celebrated:

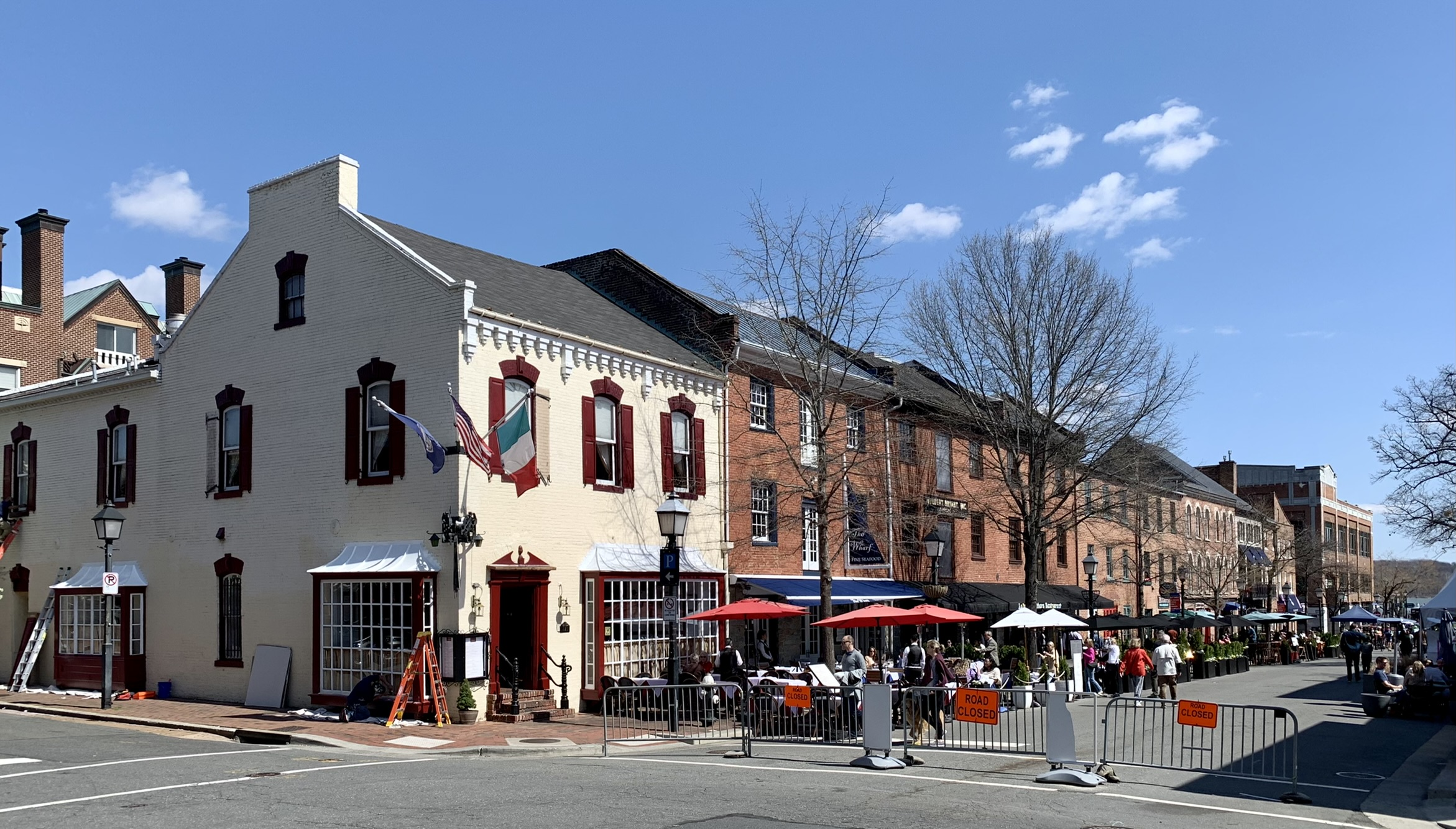
Restaurants, occupying old warehouses, with outdoor dining on King Street.

- Saint Patrick's Day Parade
- George Washington's Birthday.
- The Red Cross Waterfront Festival in June.
- The city's birthday celebration with fireworks show in July, and various ethnic heritage days at Tavern Square
- The Scottish Christmas Walk
- The "First Night Alexandria" presents many family-friendly entertainments on New Year's Eve
- Historic Homes and Garden Tour
- Springtime Art Festival
- Festival of Speed
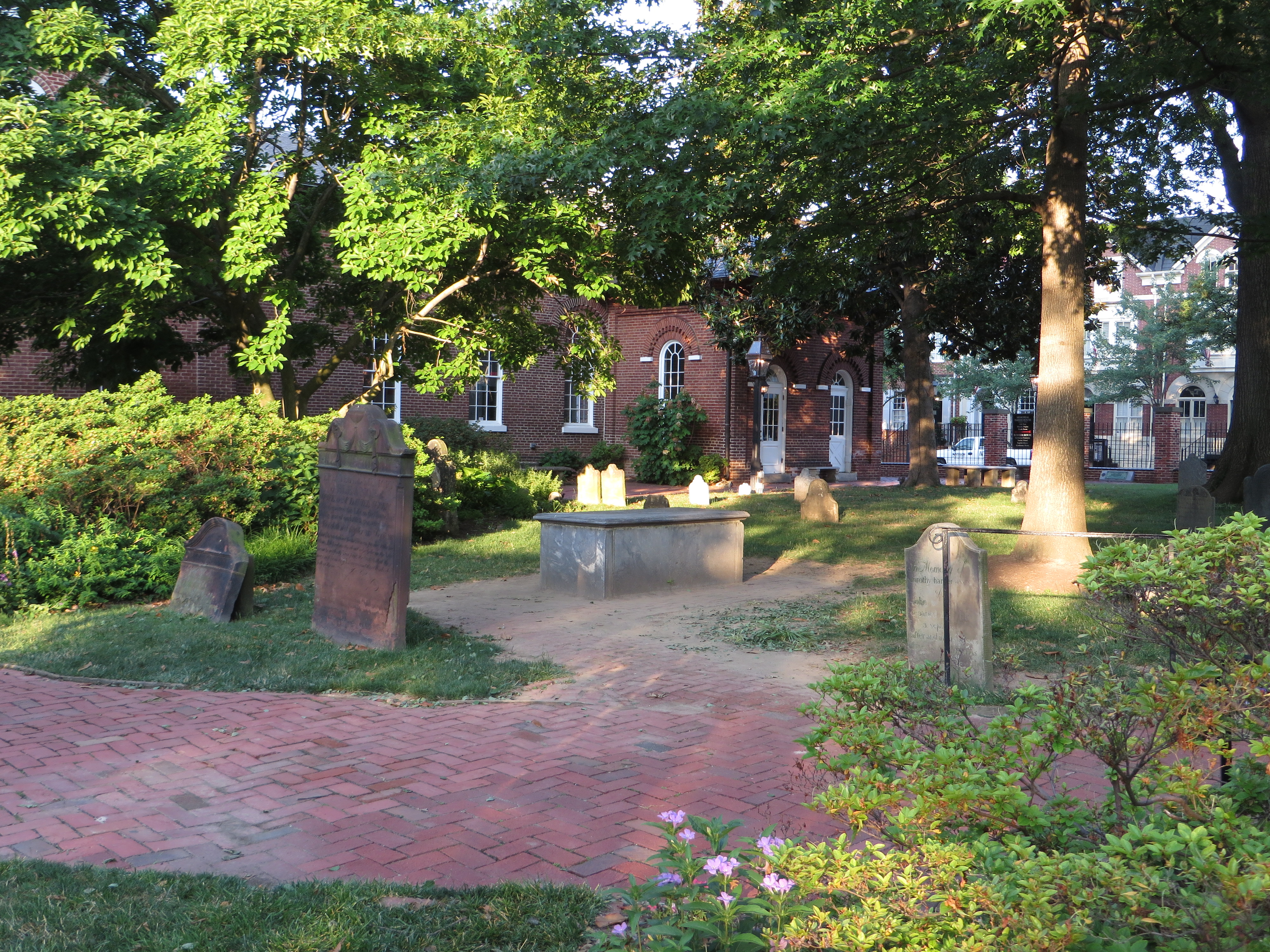
- Many early Americans as well as Civil War soldiers are buried in Christ Church's graveyard.
  Summer Festival
- Old Town Fall Art Festival
- Holiday Boat Parade of Lights

These parades and other official events are typically led by Alexandria's town crier, who, often dressed elaborately, by a tradition dating to the 18th century, in a red coat, breeches, black boots and a tricorne hat, welcomes participants.

=== Scottish Christmas Walk ===
A popular Christmas time attraction in Alexandria is the Scottish Christmas Walk, which was established in 1969. The event, which involves a parade through the center of Old Town Alexandria, celebrates the city's Scottish heritage, and is the centerpiece of a yearly holiday festival. It serves as a fundraiser for social services in Alexandria.

== Gallery ==
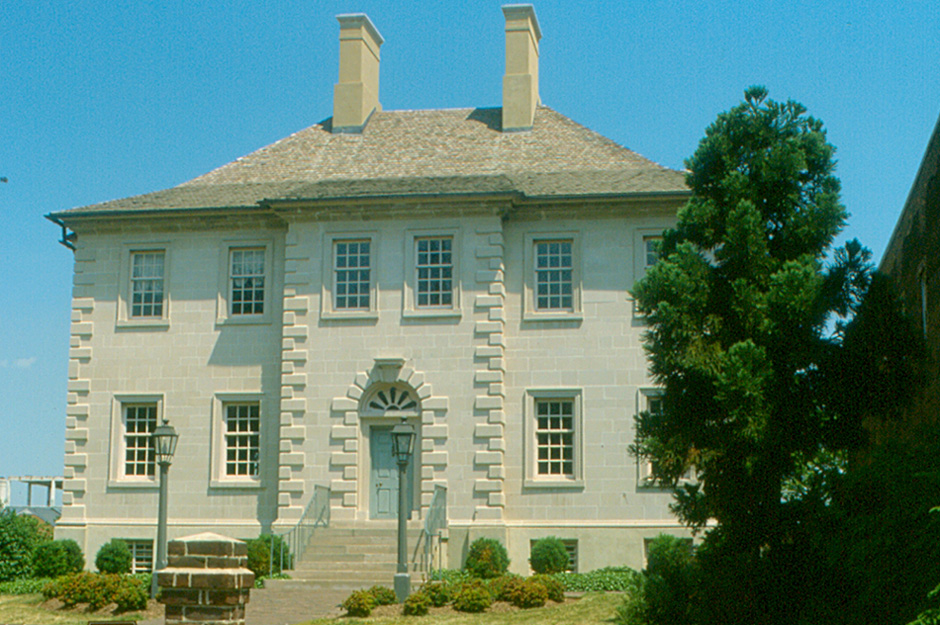
Carlyle house

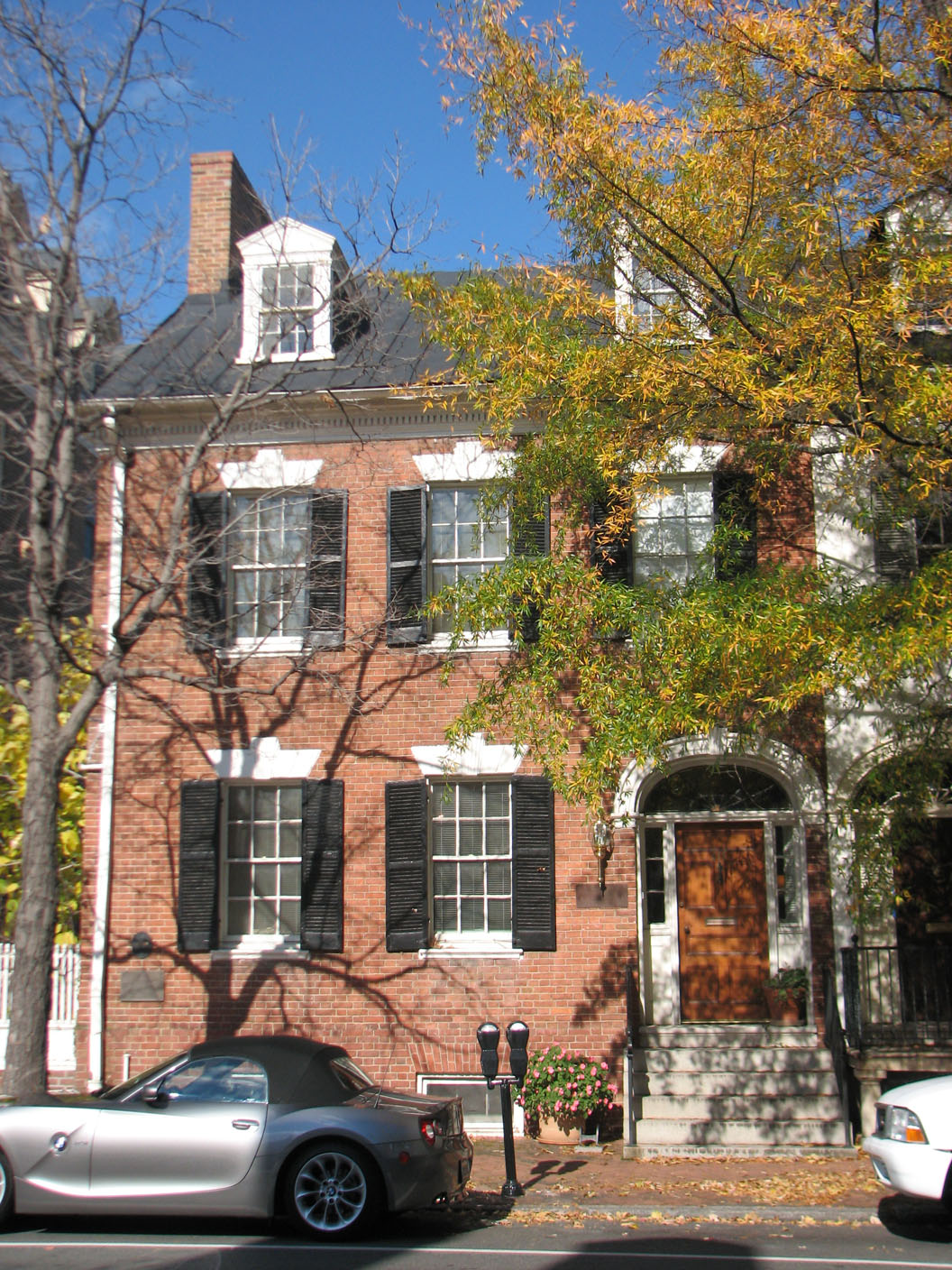
Henry Lee House

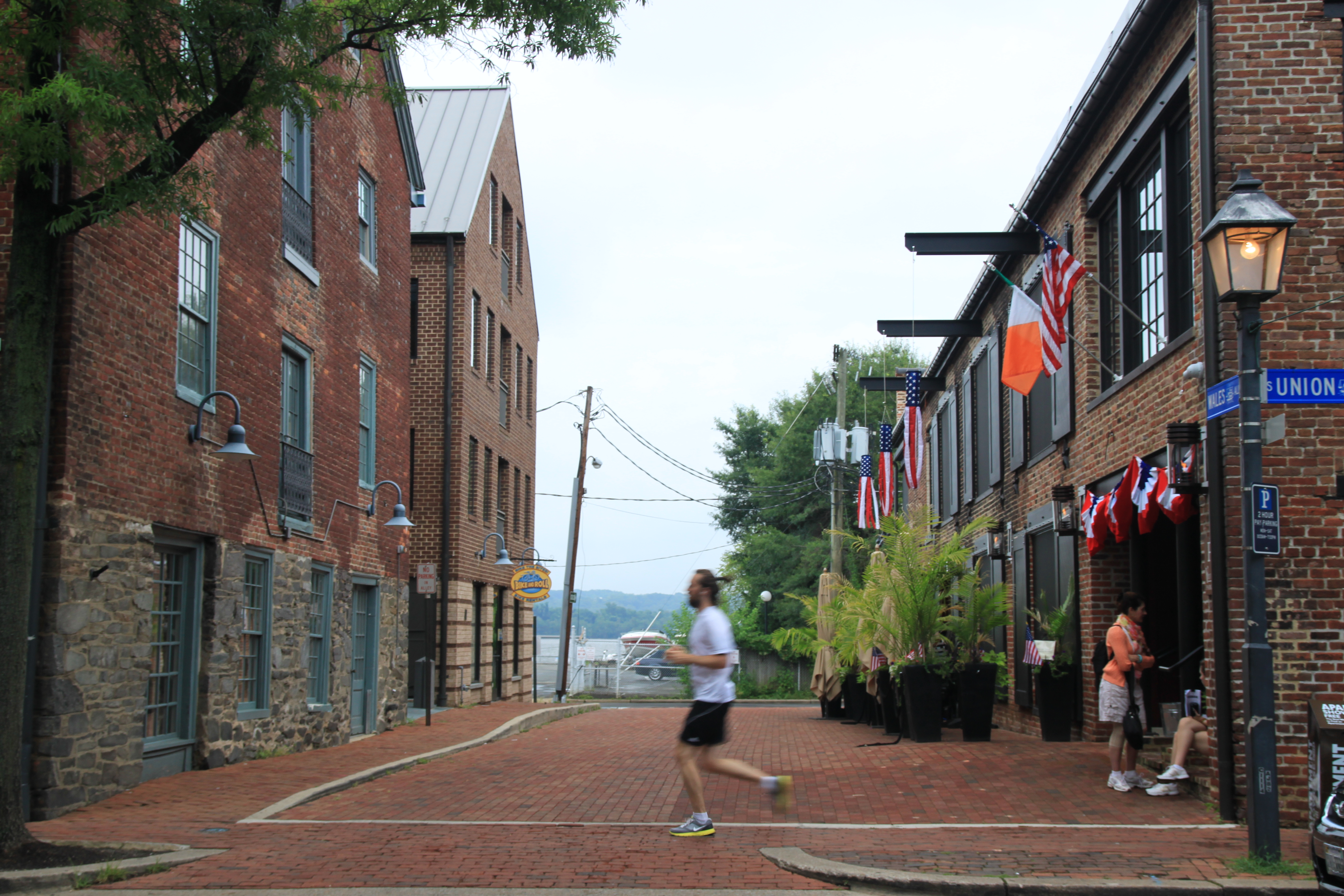
Wales Alley

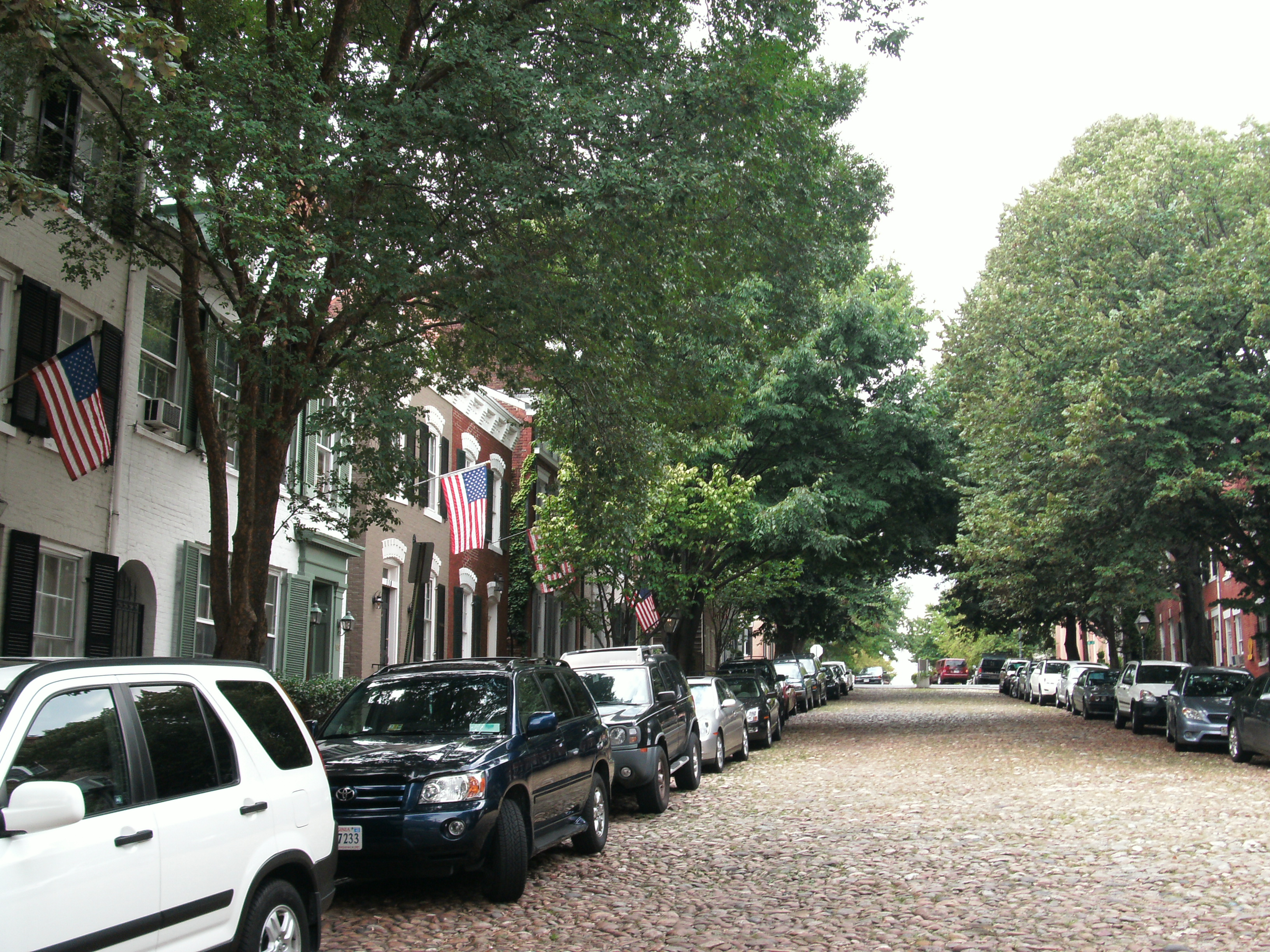
Cobblestone portion of Prince Street

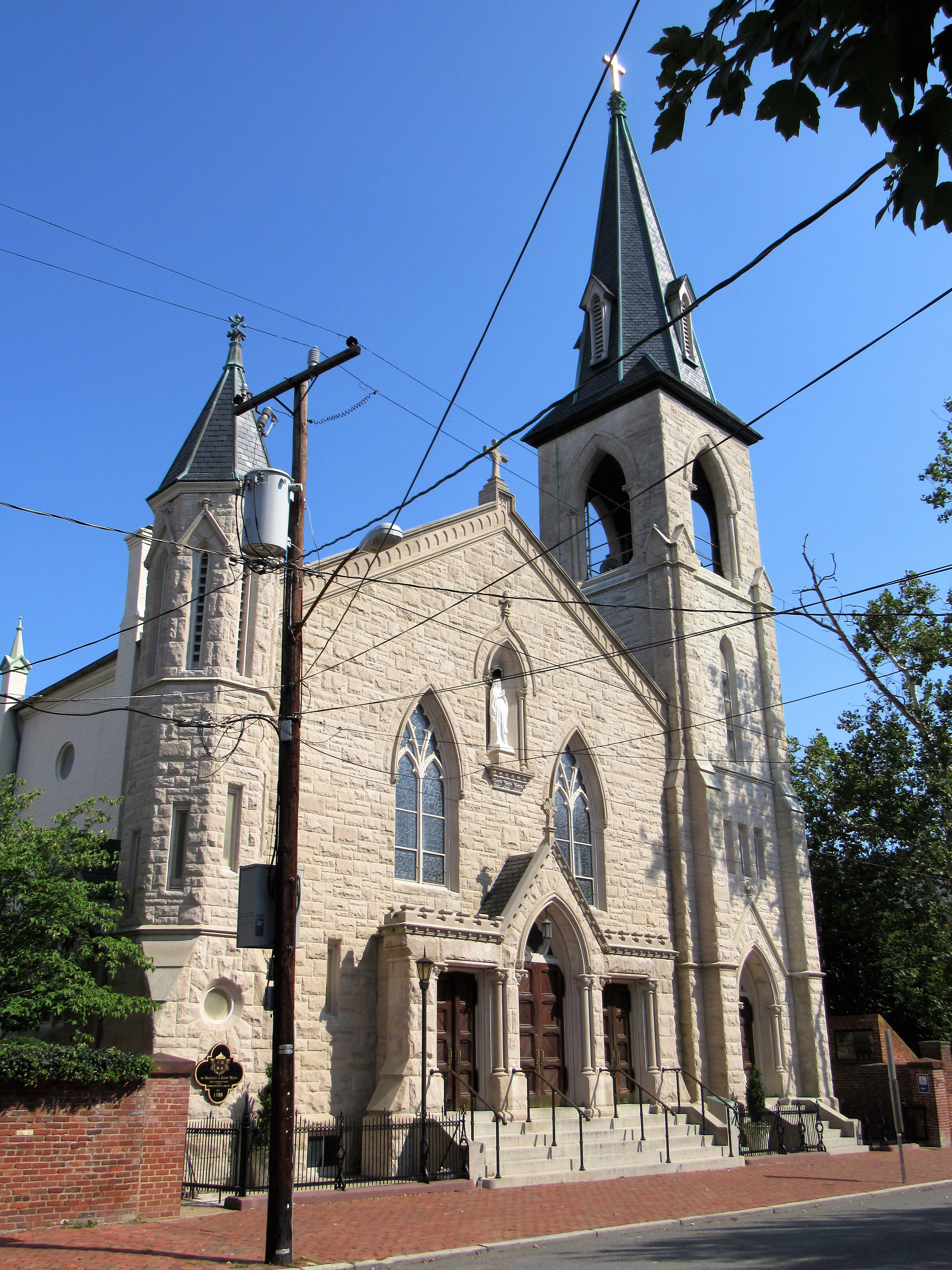
Basilica of Saint Mary (the oldest Catholic Church in Virginia)

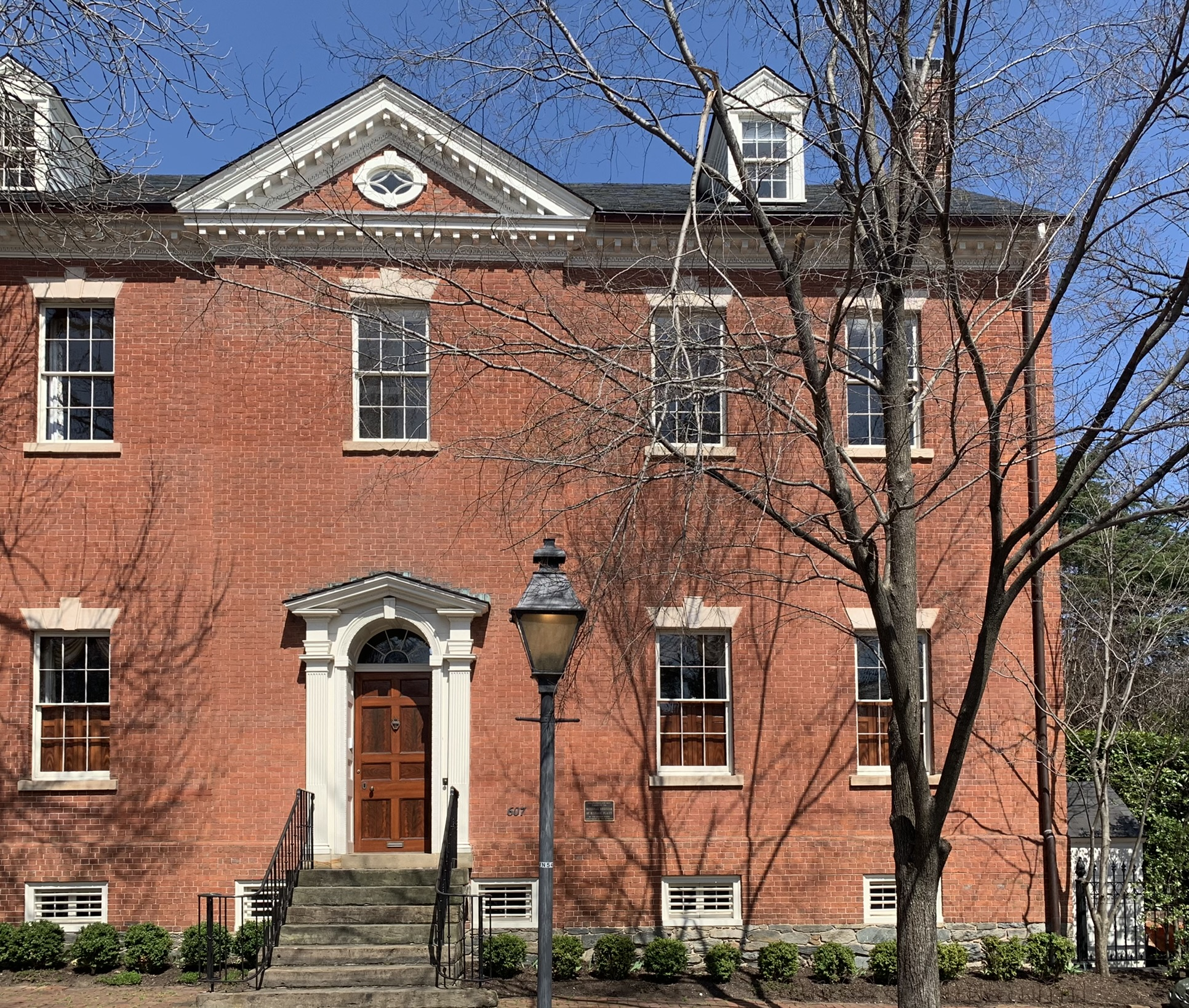
The Potts-Fitzhugh House, Robert E. Lee's boyhood home

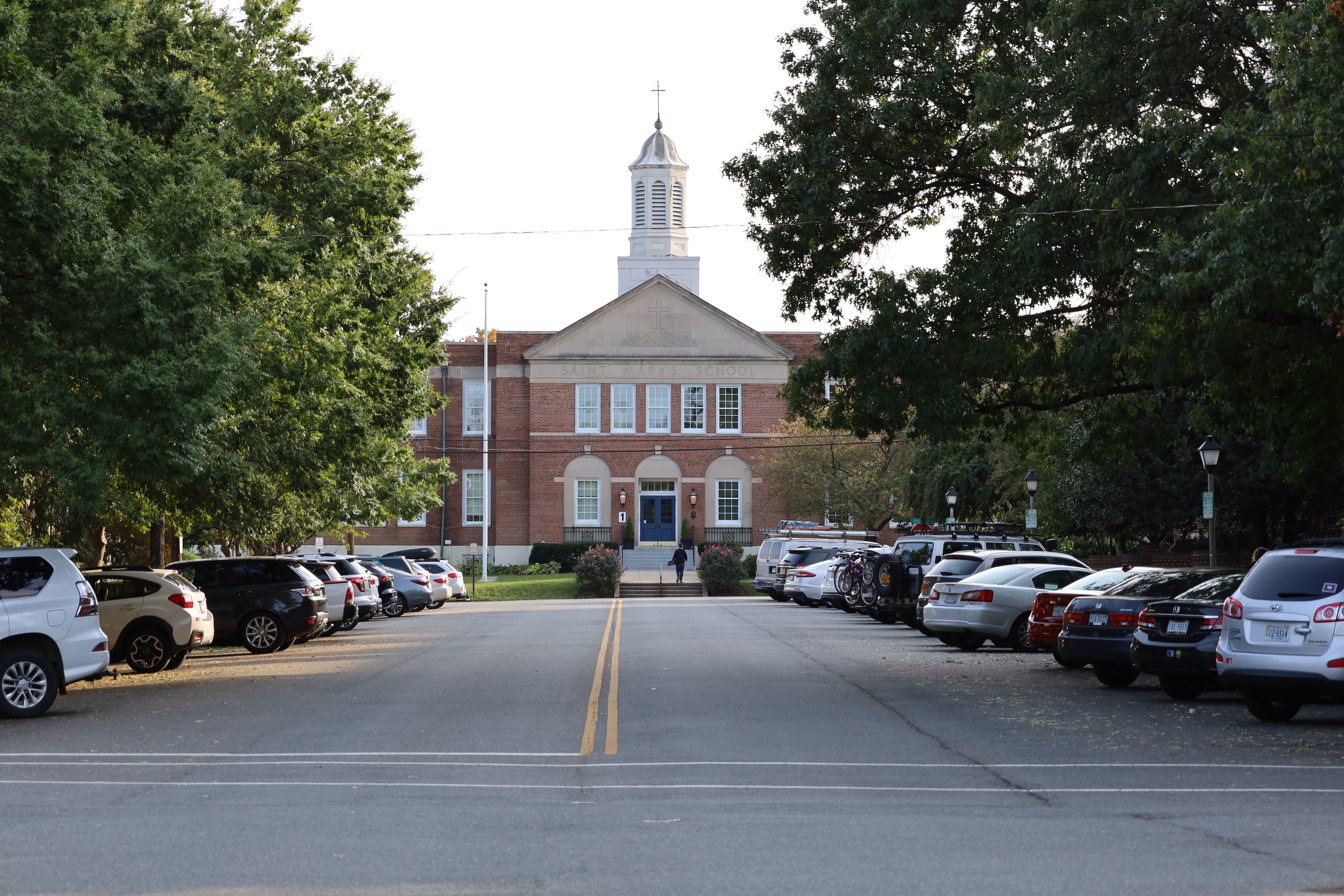
Saint Mary's School

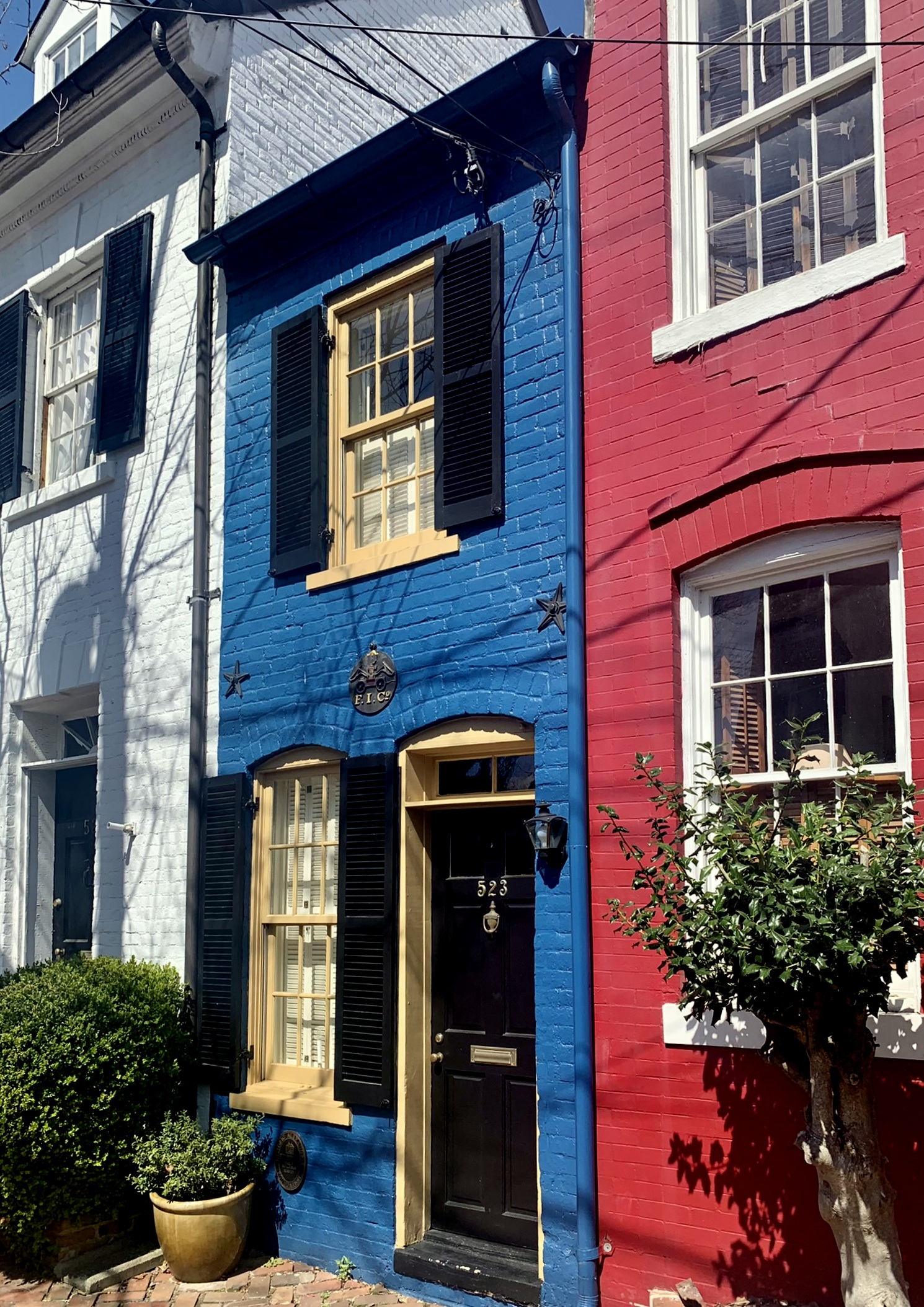
Spite House

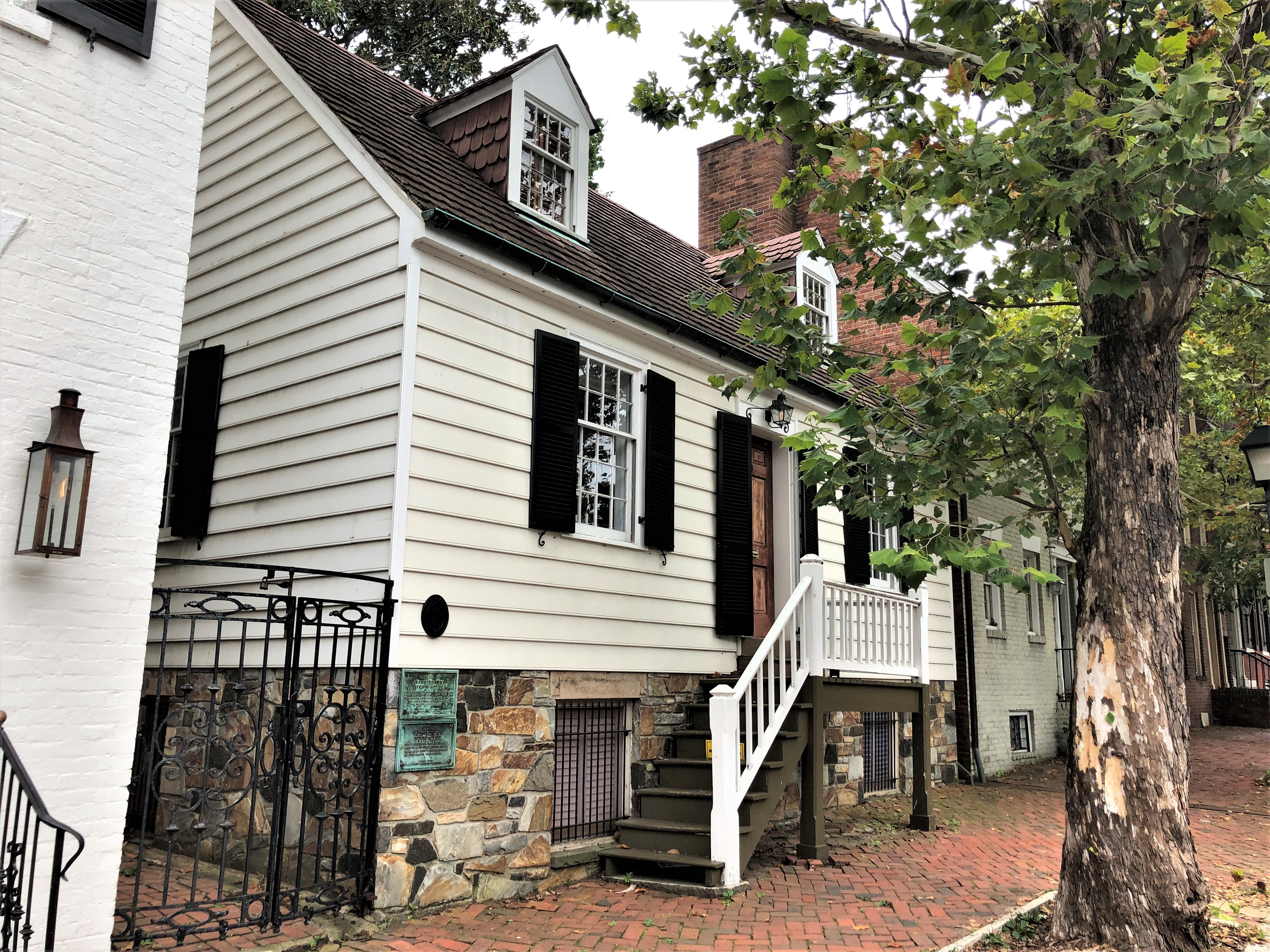
George Washington's Town House

== See also ==
- Neighborhoods of Alexandria, Virginia
