= Alexandria Archaeology Museum =

Museum in Virginia, United States

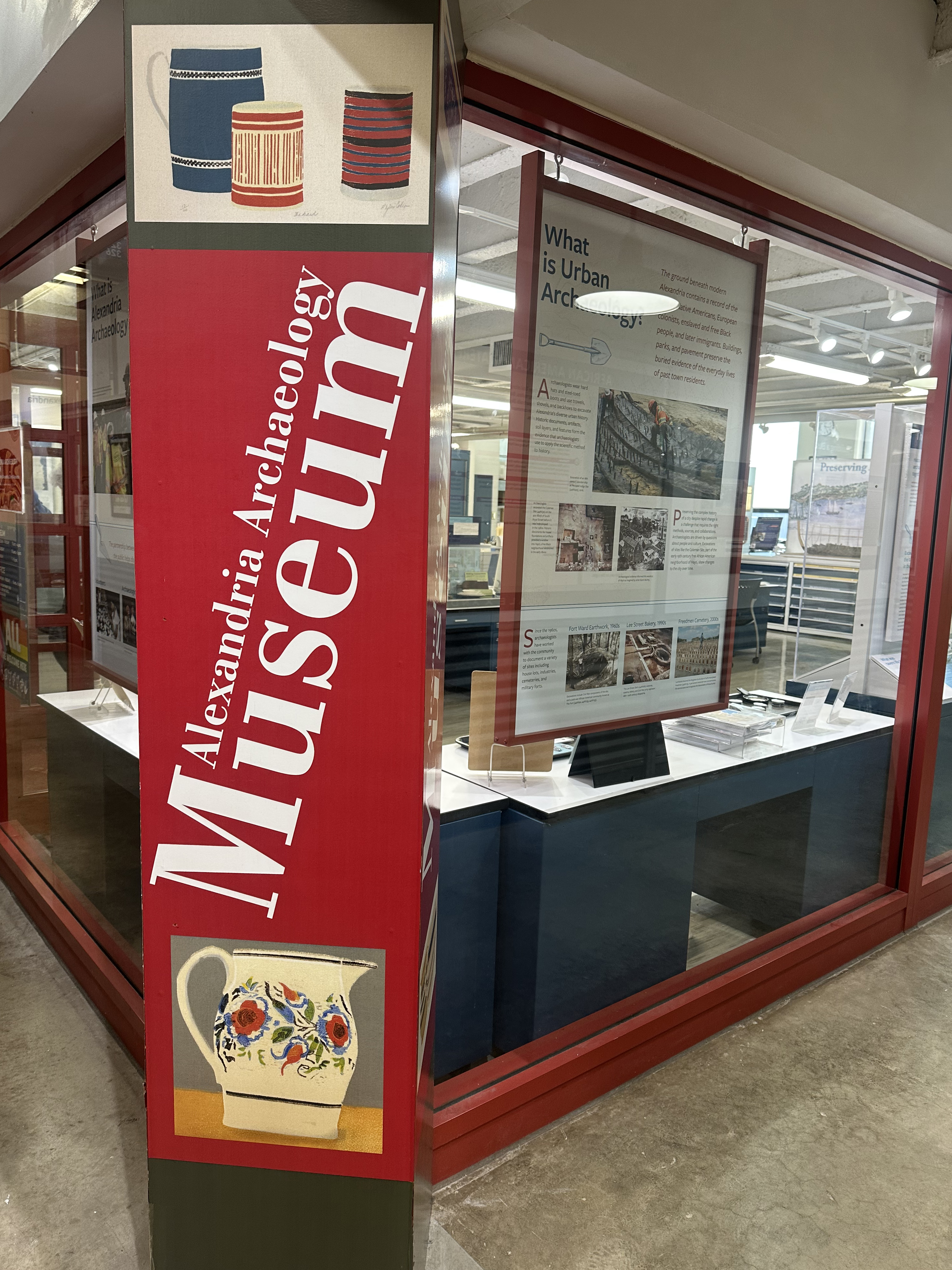
- Location: Torpedo Factory Art Center; Old Town Alexandria, Virginia, U.S.
- Coordinates: 38°48′17″N 77°02′24″W
- Type: Archaeology museum
- Collections: Archaeology of Alexandria, VA
- Public transit access: Washington Metro at King Street–Old Town
- Website: www.alexandriava.gov/Archaeology

The Alexandria Archaeology Museum is an institution dedicated to the preservation and study of the archaeological heritage of Alexandria, Virginia.

According to the National Park Service, the museum exhibits feature 10,000 years of the human history of Alexandria.

In addition to artifacts, the museum also jointly holds a collection of 160 oral histories in conjunction with two other institutions, the Black History Museum and the Lyceum.

== See also ==
- Torpedo Factory Art Center
