= Shiloh Baptist Church (Alexandria, Virginia) =

Historic church in Virginia, US

Coordinates: 38°48′14″N 77°03′19″W

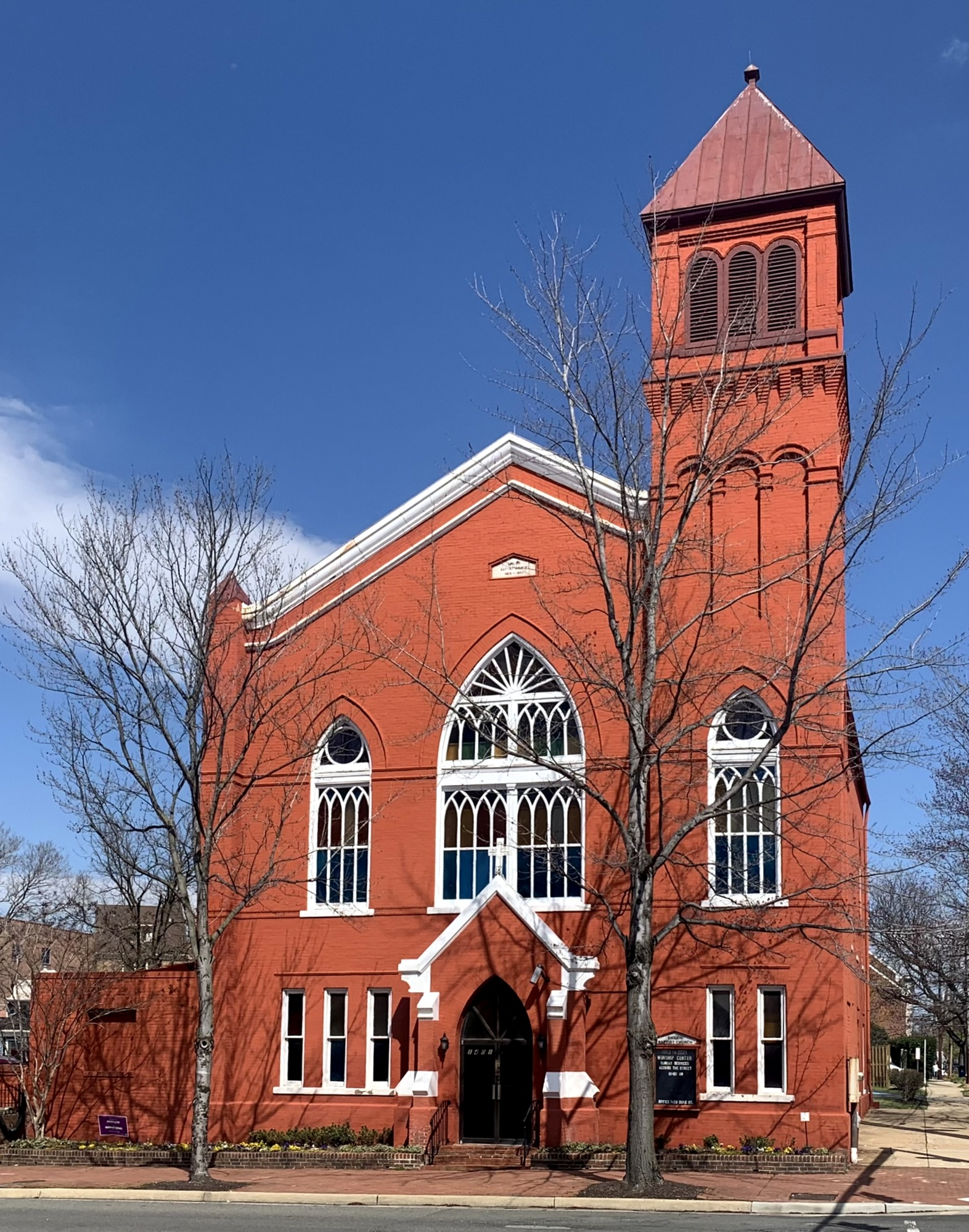
Shiloh Baptist Church, Alexandria, Virginia

Shiloh Baptist Church is a predominantly Black Baptist Church at 1401 Duke Street in Old Town Alexandria, Virginia. At the time of its dedication in 1893, the historic building had a great bell tower, eight stained glass windows, modern circular oak pews, and a large reflector with glass prisms. While this historic building continues to be used as a youth center, the church has expanded to a large new sanctuary across Duke Street.

Shiloh is one of 10 Black churches founded in Alexandria following the Civil War to support freed Black Americans as they formed new communities and associations. (Note: These include Zion Baptist, 1864; Shiloh Baptist, around 1863; Third Baptist Church, 1865; Meade Memorial, 1869; Ebenezer Baptist, 1881; Good Shepard Episcopal Chapel, 1883; Mt. Jezreel, 1890; and Oakland Baptist, 1891.) It was founded in 1863, when a group of about 50 African Americans met in the mess hall on the L’Ouverture Hospital grounds, where wounded Black Union soldiers and contraband civilians were being housed during the Civil War.

== History ==
=== Civil War and Reconstruction ===
At a time when African Americans were not treated in the same hospitals as whites, the Union forces occupying Alexandria built the separate L'Ouverture Hospital for the treatment of wounded Black Union soldiers and contraband refugees fleeing slavery in the Confederacy. As part of the hospital grounds, a contraband barracks was built on the adjacent block facing Prince St. A group of about 50 African Americans, many housed in the Prince St.Contraband Barracks, met in the mess hall on the L’Ouverture Hospital grounds, to be led in worship and prayer by white Baptist chaplains and then by the Rev. Leland Warring, himself a former slave, teacher, and Baptist minister. Rev. Warring continued to lead this church community of Black Baptists until 1889.

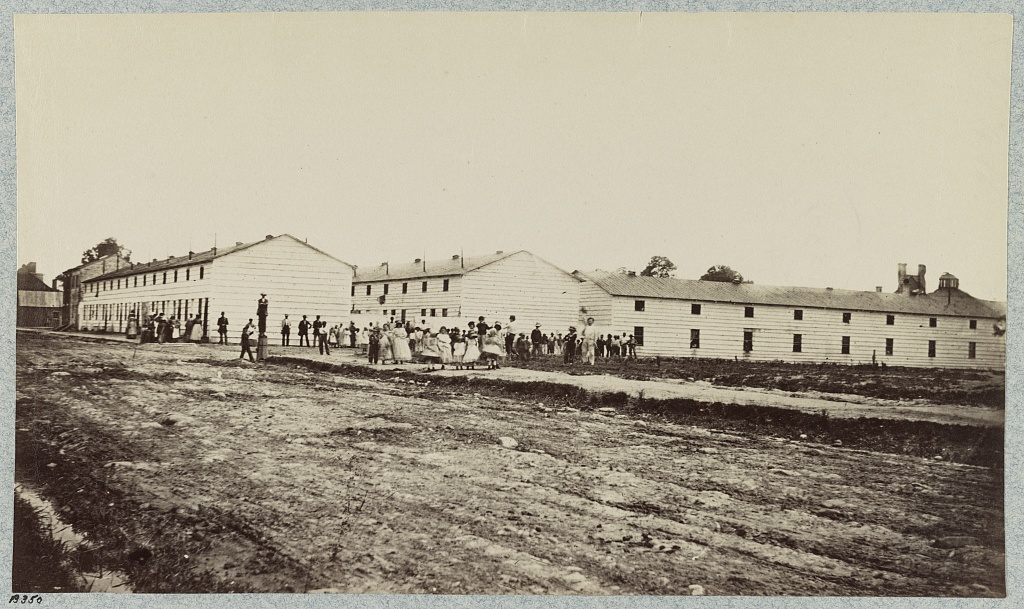
Prince St. Contraband Barracks

Just a few months after the end of the Civil War Shiloh Baptist Church was able to dedicate their first house of worship in September 1865. Contemporary sources describe this as "a frame building near the intersection of Prince and West Streets, known as Shiloh Chapel, a colored Baptist meeting house". This location was near the L’Ouverture Hospital grounds where they had first gathered for worship two years earlier. This first Shiloh Chapel was destroyed by fire in 1872.

The following year, 1873, the trustees of Shiloh Baptist Church purchased a lot on the west side of West Street, between Duke and Prince Streets for $175. This would have been at or near the site of their original chapel, destroyed by fire. The low purchase price seems to indicate that this lot was unimproved at the time of purchase. A city map dated 1877 shows a new building on this lot, labeled as "Shiloh Col’d. Bapt. Ch.,"; no further construction details are known about this new church.

In 1884 the church purchased the adjacent corner lot on West and Duke Streets for $300. In 1890, discord in the Shiloh community caused some members to leave and establish the new Mt. Jezreel Baptist Church, with a sanctuary on North Payne Street.

It took several years for Shiloh Baptist to build on their new larger corner lot facing Duke St. They hired architect and builder, and construction of their new church started in 1891. The building costs tallied $8,000, and the furniture cost another $2,000. The new Shiloh Baptist Church had a bell tower, eight stained glass windows, modern circular oak pews, and a large reflector with glass prisms hung from the ceiling. The dedication took place on October 23, 1893 with speakers and choirs from across the region. A highlight of the celebration was the Church Art and Industrial Fair. The new lecture room in the church was filled with more than 300 exhibits from Washington, D.C., Pennsylvania, New York, showcasing the skill and progress of African American craftspeople.

=== World War I and beyond ===
Like all the Black churches in Alexandria built before World War I, Shiloh marks the original site of a Black neighborhood, centered around the L’Ouverture Hospital and Freedman’s Barracks. (Note: For more on the historic Black neighborhoods of Alexandria, see Courageous Journey, page 15ff.) Over the years its members have spread across the region and into Maryland. In 1953 the Shiloh Transportation Committee was bringing worshippers from Lincolnia to attend Sunday services. The next year they purchased a vintage 1944 passenger bus for $600 to address transportation needs as the members continued to move further afield.

== Today ==
The neighborhood itself has changed with the construction of the King Str. Metro Station in the 1980’s. While maintaining their historic sanctuary, which has been repurposed as a youth center, they have expanded to a large new sanctuary across Duke Street, dedicated in 2005. Now the 1000 plus parishioners come mostly by car, and in the planning of the new larger church adequate parking was included. Shiloh Baptist Church remains in use as an active place of worship.
