= Appomattox (statue) =

Bronze statue in Virginia, United States

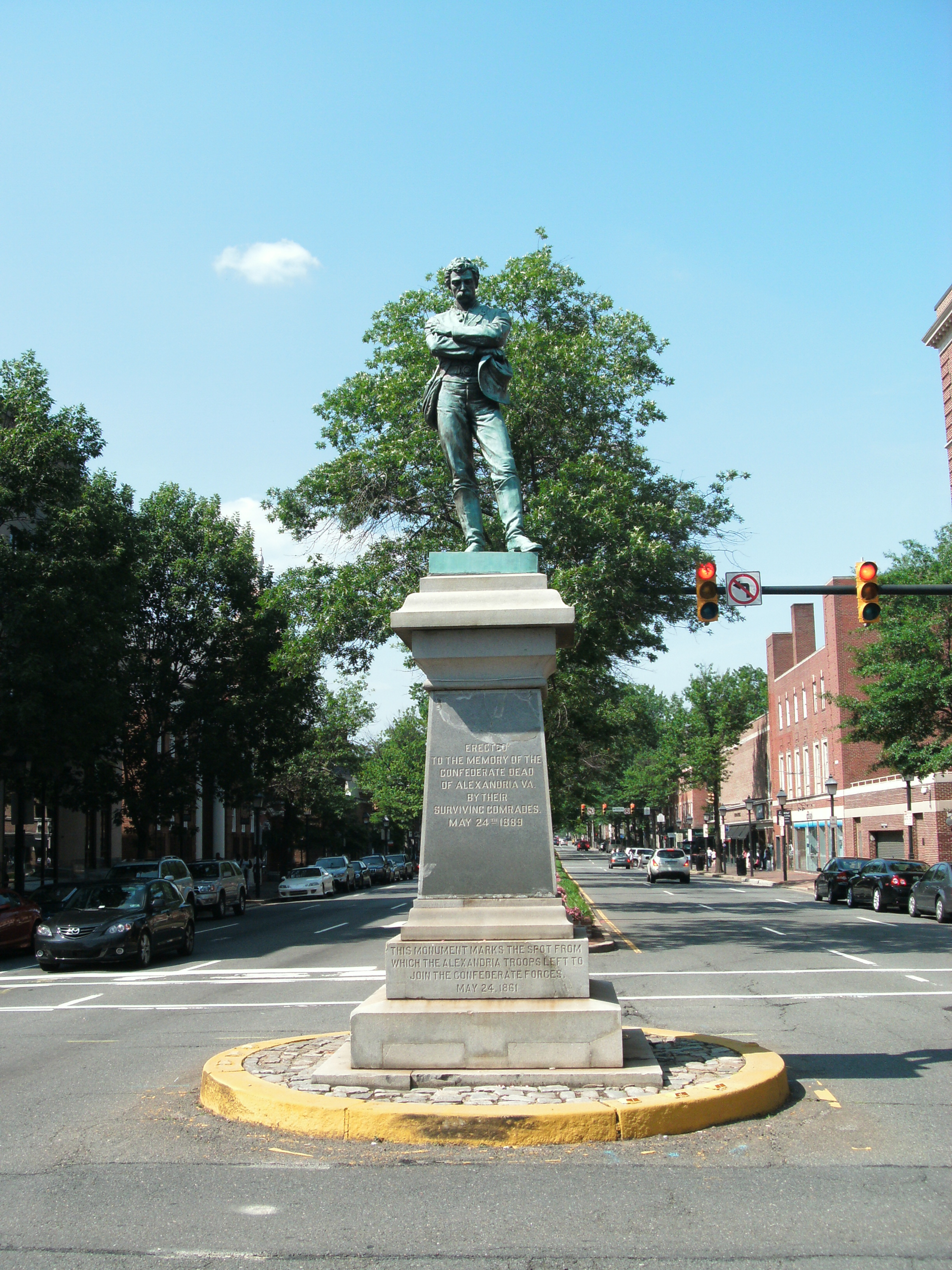
- The statue in 2010

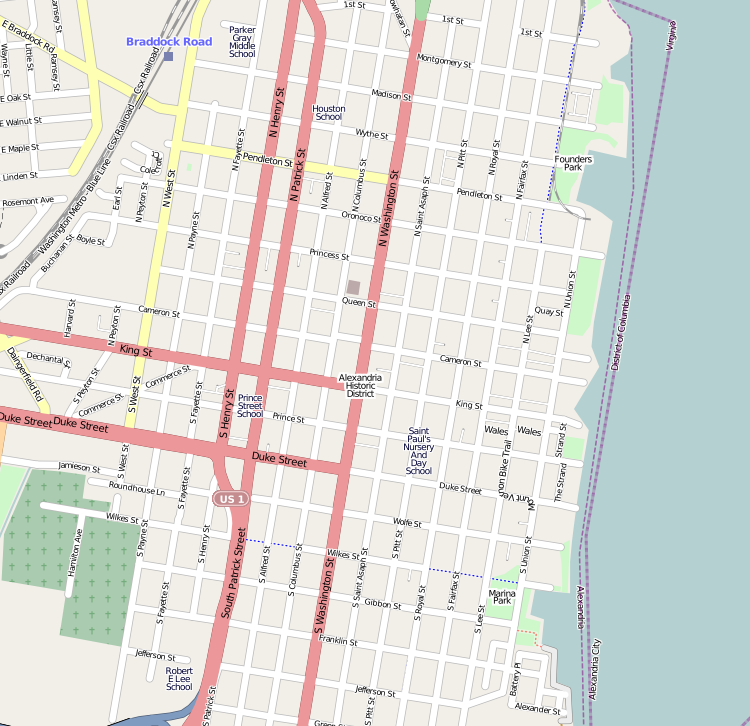
- Location within Alexandria Historical District Location within Virginia Location within the United States
- Artist: Caspar Buberl
- Year: 1889
- Location: Alexandria, Virginia, United States (formerly); 38°48′14″N 77°02′50″W
- Appomattox Statue
- U.S. National Register of Historic Places
- Virginia Landmarks Register
- Location within Virginia Location within the United States
- Location: Jct. of Prince & Washington Sts., Alexandria, Virginia
- Area: less than one acre
- NRHP reference No.: 100001066
- VLR No.: 100-0284

Significant dates
- Added to NRHP: June 12, 2017
- Designated VLR: March 16, 2017

Appomattox is a bronze statue commemorating soldiers from Alexandria, Virginia, who had died while fighting for the Confederacy during the American Civil War. The memorial was located in the center of the intersection of South Washington Street (Virginia Route 400) and Prince Street in the Old Town neighborhood of Alexandria.

The National Park Service placed the monument on the National Register of Historic Places during 2017. The statue was removed on June 2, 2020, during nationwide protests during which vandals defaced segregation-era statues following the May 2020 murder of George Floyd in Minneapolis, Minnesota.

== History ==
=== Creation ===
In 1889, sculptor M. Caspar Buberl cast the statue, which the Robert E. Lee camp of the United Confederate Veterans (UCV) commissioned and erected. The form of the soldier was designed by John Adams Elder, who modeled it after a painting of the same title that shows a lone Confederate viewing the aftermath of the battle of Appomattox Court House, where Gen. Robert E. Lee surrendered to Union general Ulysses S. Grant.

The dedication ceremony was held on May 24, 1889, and was attended by a vast crowd. It was noted that by noon of that day, a great influx of visitors had swarmed the town of Alexandria to take part in the ceremony, which was overseen by Fitzhugh Lee, who was governor of Virginia at that time. Joseph E. Johnston, former Confederate general of the Army of Tennessee, was also in attendance. The UCV foresaw the controversy that would arise over the monument. Thus, they petitioned the Virginia House of Delegates in the same year to have it protected by state law.

=== Later history ===
During the early hours of Saturday, August 20, 1988, a van crashed into the monument, toppling the statue from its base. The Alexandria City Council subsequently voted to restore the monument, despite the objections of Mayor Jim Moran and some of the city's African American residents, including the president of the city's chapter of the National Association for the Advancement of Colored People (NAACP).

The crash exposed a time capsule that had been placed at the base of the statue. A man living at a nearby YMCA then fled with the capsule, resulting in a police investigation. After a detective found the thief, the man allowed the detective to return the capsule with its contents intact to the United Daughters of the Confederacy (UDC), which owned the statue.

In September 2016, after a period of public debate, the Alexandria City Council voted unanimously to move the statue to the lawn of the Lyceum, a city history museum located in a corner of the intersection. However, at that time, state legislators declined to introduce legislation to make this possible, seeing its passage as unlikely.

On March 16, 2017, the Virginia Department of Historic Resources listed the Appomattox statue on the Virginia Landmarks Register. The National Park Service listed the statue on the National Register of Historic Places (NRHP) on June 12, 2017. The NRHP registration form, which the president of a Virginia chapter of the UDC had prepared, stated that the "property embodies the distinctive characteristics of a type, period, or method of construction or represents the work of a master, or possesses high artistic values, or represents a significant and distinguishable entity whose components lack individual distinction." The registration form further stated: "The statue was not intended to glorify an ideology, but to remember those who sacrificed all."

During August 2017, members of the Democratic Party who were serving in the Virginia General Assembly stated that they wanted to propose a bill that would permit the City of Alexandria to remove the statue. During the 2018 General Assembly session, Alexandria's Democratic Delegate Mark Levine introduced two such bills to accomplish this—one unique to Appomattox and the other allowing local control of all of Virginia's Confederate memorials—but both bills died by 6-2 votes in a legislative subcommittee.

On Saturday, December 14, 2019, an automobile crashed into the monument at approximately 2:00 a.m., shifting the statue off its base and cracking the base. Unlike the 1988 crash, the statue did not fall from the base.

=== Removal ===
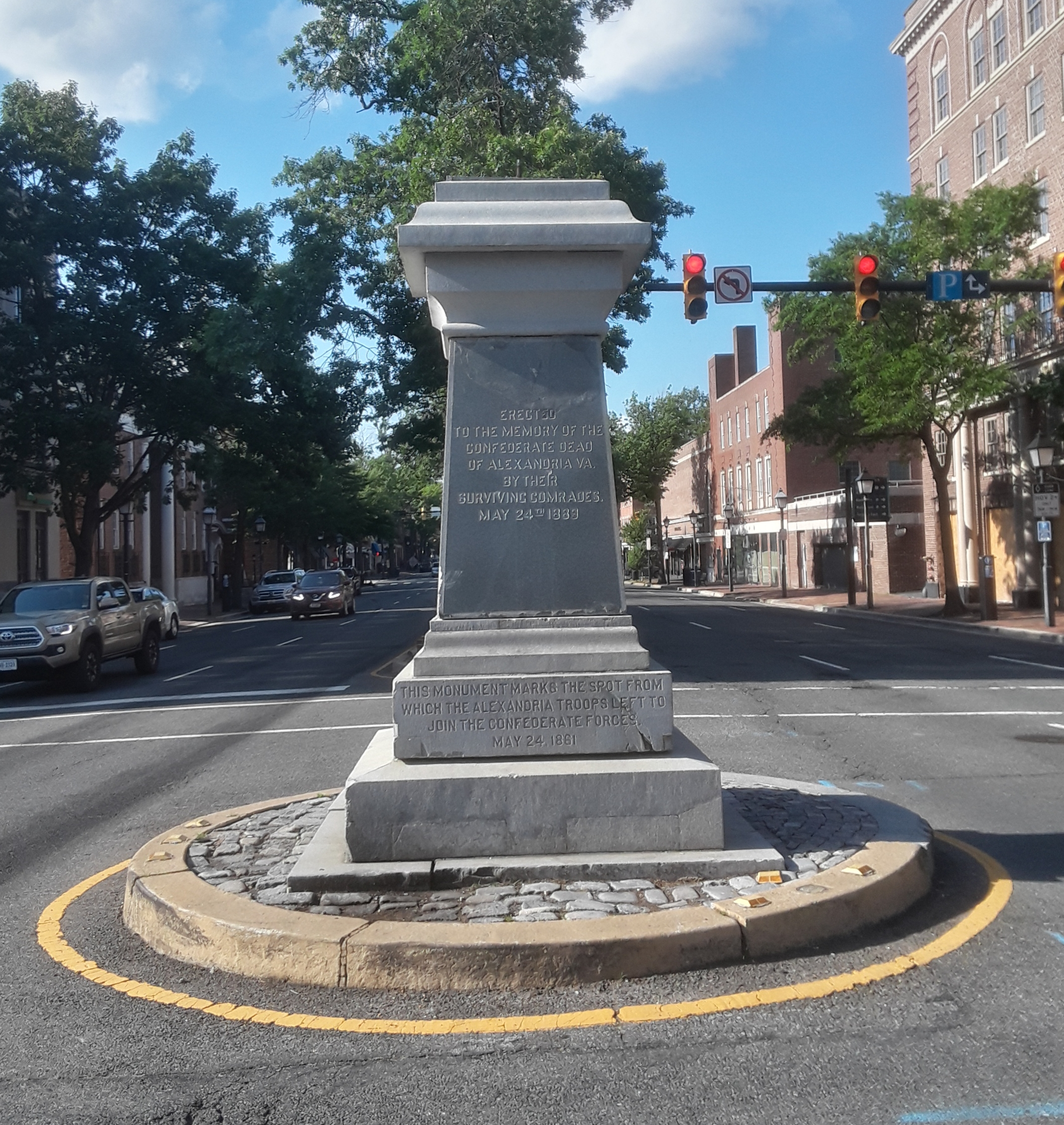
The pedestal in its original location on June 6, 2020, after the statue's removal.

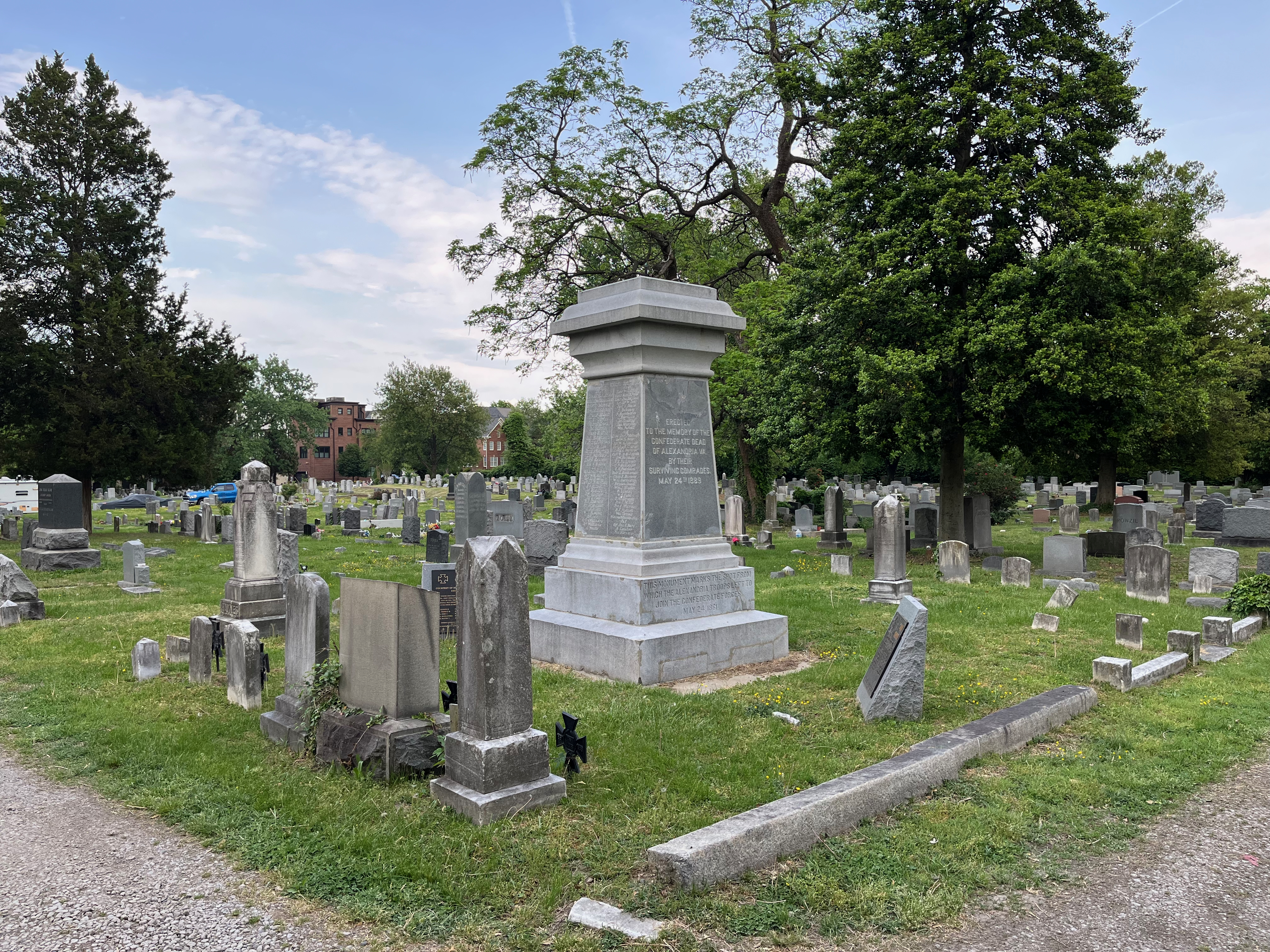
The pedestal in Bethel Cemetery in 2026

During 2020, the first year during which the Democratic Party had full control of Virginia government since 1994, Democratic delegates Delores McQuinn and Mamie Locke introduced legislation that, when enacted, enabled the governments of local jurisdictions to authorize and permit the erection of monuments or memorials for the veterans of any war or conflict, including the Civil War. The legislation also enabled those governments to remove, relocate, contextualize, or cover any such monument or memorial on the jurisdiction's public property, except for those in public cemeteries, regardless of when the monument or memorial was erected. The legislation became effective on July 1, 2020.

On June 1, 2020, the UDC requested a permit to remove the statue during the following day. Although the City of Alexandria had planned to remove the statue on July 1 (the effective date of the new law), the UDC moved the date up. On June 2, workers removed the soldier sculpture for the UDC while the City provided traffic control, but left the base intact. The UDC then took the statue to a private location, which it did not reveal to the city. The pedestal was removed at a later date and the street was altered to remove the circle in which the statue had stood.

In summer 2022, the pedestal was moved to a location in the Bethel Cemetery in Alexandria hosting several gravesites of Confederate soldiers. As of February 2023, there were plans to place the statue atop it.

== Appearance ==
The statue is cast in bronze and stood upon a square stone base with inscriptions on each side. The figure is that of a lone Confederate soldier, who stood facing south with his arms crossed. His wide-brimmed hat was clasped in his right hand and he was looking down toward the ground with a somber expression on his face. The soldier was facing south, the general direction of the battlefields of the Civil War.

The base was made of concrete and marble and bore several inscriptions. The north side of the base read, "They died in the consciousness of duty faithfully performed." The south side read, "Erected to the memory of Confederate dead of Alexandria, Va. by their Surviving Comrades, May 24th 1889." The east and west sides bore the names of those from Alexandria who died during the Civil War.

A short way from the statue's former site is a stone historic marker with a bronze plaque upon which is engraved the following:

THE CONFEDERATE STATUE

The unarmed Confederate soldier standing in
the intersection of Washington and Prince
Streets marks the location where units from
Alexandria left to join the Confederate Army
on May 24, 1861. The soldier is facing the
battlefields to the South where his comrades
fell during the War Between the States. The
names of those Alexandrians who died in service
for the Confederacy are inscribed on the base
of the statue. The title of the sculpture is
"Appomattox" by M. Casper Buberl.

The statue was erected in 1889 by the Robert E. Lee Camp
United Confederate Veterans."

== See also ==
- List of monuments and memorials removed during the George Floyd protests
