= Neighborhoods of Alexandria, Virginia =

Alexandria, Virginia, is an independent city in the Commonwealth of Virginia, located along the western bank of the Potomac River. The city of approximately 151,000 is about six miles (9.6 kilometers) south of downtown Washington, D.C.

== Overview ==
As of 2024, the City of Alexandria is divided for urban planning purposes into 19 "Small Area Plans" and 11 additional overlapping plans. These areas and their component neighborhoods include:

Planning area (Small Area Plans)	Neighborhoods/ Subdivisions	Landmarks	Parks/ Cemeteries
Central Alexandria: Old Town; Old Town North; Hunting Creek; King Street retail; Northeast; Southwest Quadrant; Waterfront	Old Town; The Berg		Old Town: Founders; Point Lumley; Waterfront; Windmill Hill; Old Town North: Montgomery; Oronoco Bay; Rivergate; Tidelock; Hunting Creek area: Jones Point
Alexandria West	Dowden Terrace; The Hamlets; Lincolnia; Park Center; Southern Towers		Holmes Run Park
Arlandia–Chirilagua	Arlandria		
Beauregard	Adams; Garden District; Greenway; Seminary Overlook; Southern Towers; Upland Park		Dora Kelley Nature Park; Winkler Botanical Reserve
Braddock Road Metro Station Area	Braddock area; Braddock Place; Colecroft; Henry Street Corridor; Parker–Gray; Uptown–Parker–Gray Historic District		
Eisenhower East and Carlyle; Eisenhower West; King Street Metro/ Eisenhower; Seminary Hill/ Strawberry Hill (part)	Eisenhower Valley: Eisenhower West; Eisenhower East; Carlyle		
Fairlington/Bradlee			
Van Dorn	Bounded by: Shirley Hwy.; Cameron Run; Holmes Run; city limits	Cameron Station; Landmark Shopping Center; West End	
North Ridge/ Rosemont	Beverley Hills; Braddock Heights; North Ridge; Historic districts: Parkfairfax; Rosemont		Ivy Hill Cemetery
Potomac West; Mount Vernon Ave. Business Area	Del Ray; Potomac; Temple Park		
Potomac Yard/ Potomac Green; North Potomac Yard	Potomac Yard		
Seminary Hill/ Strawberry Hill	Bradlee; Eisenhower Valley (part); Holmes Run, Brookville, Foxchase; Seminary Hill; Seminary Valley; Strawberry Hill	Virginia Theological Seminary	
Taylor Run/ Duke Street	Clover-College Park; Taylor Run		

=== Fairfax County ===
Many areas outside the city have an Alexandria mailing address yet are a part of Fairfax County including: Hollin Hills, Franconia, Groveton, Hybla Valley, Huntington, Lincolnia, Belle Haven, Mount Vernon, Fort Hunt, Engleside, Burgundy Village, Waynewood, Wilton Woods, Rose Hill, Virginia Hills, Hayfield, and Kingstowne. Some refer to these areas as Lower Alexandria, South Alexandria, or Alexandria, Fairfax County.

== Old Town ==
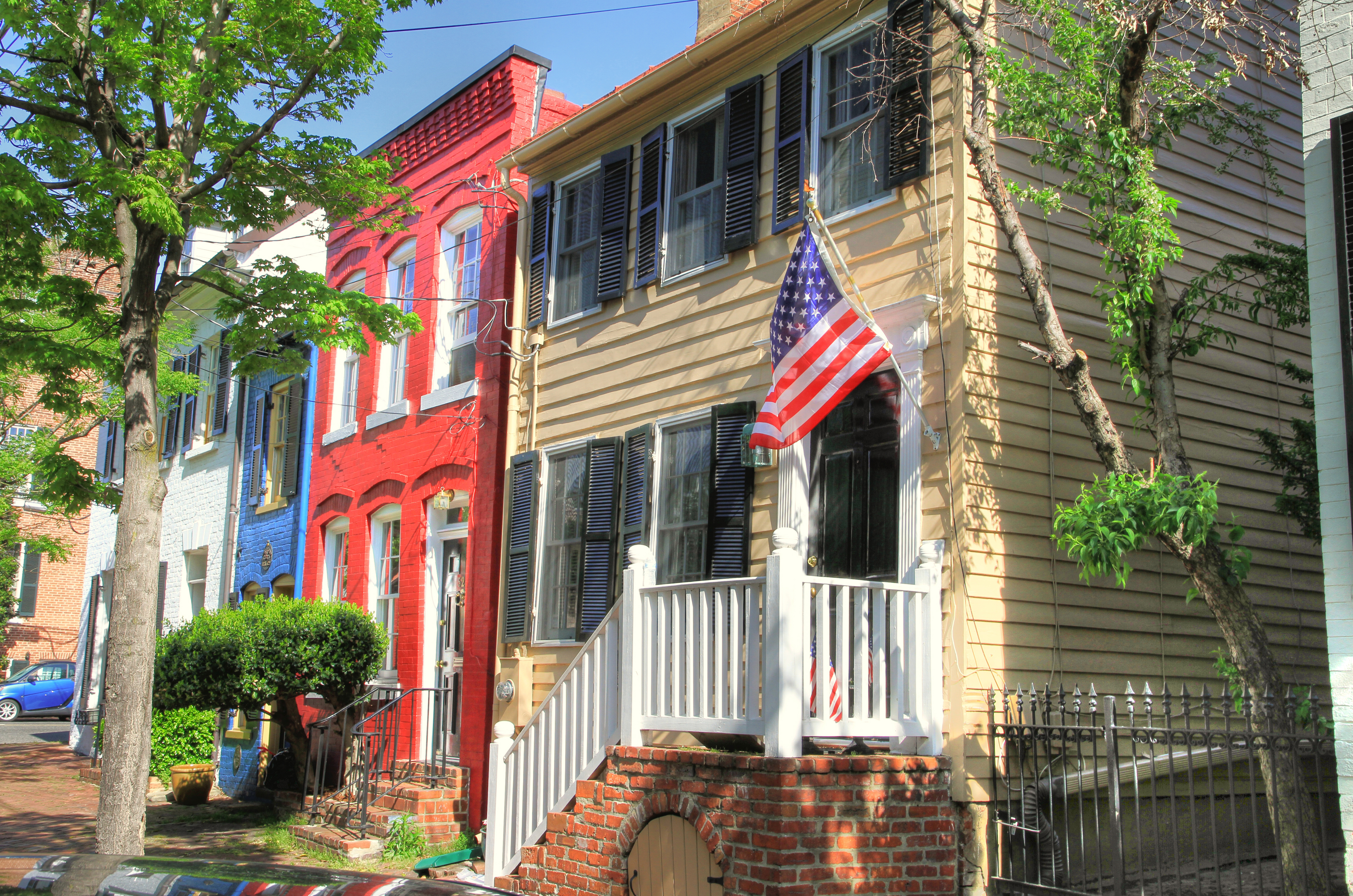
Old Town Alexandria

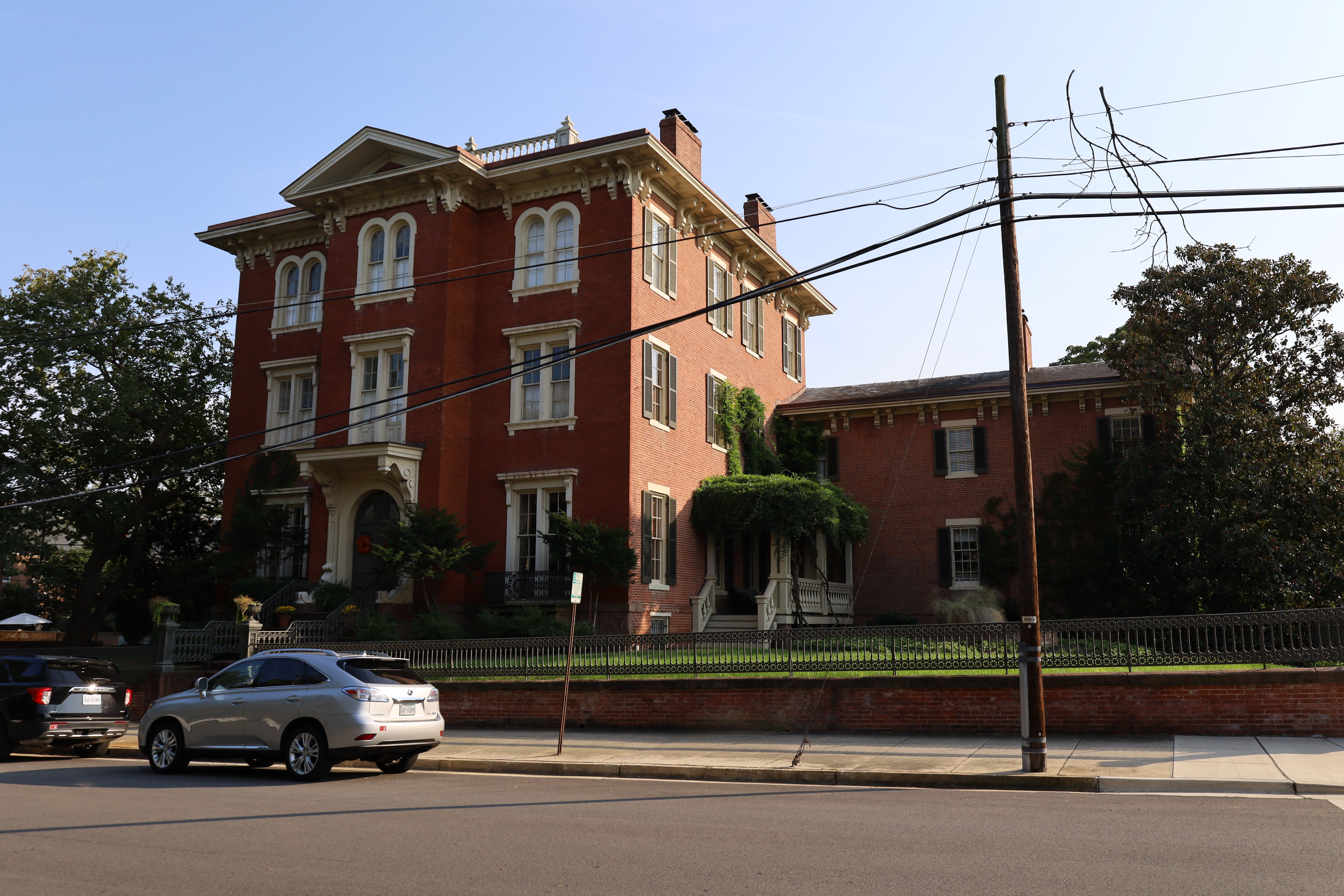
Vowell-Smith House in 2020

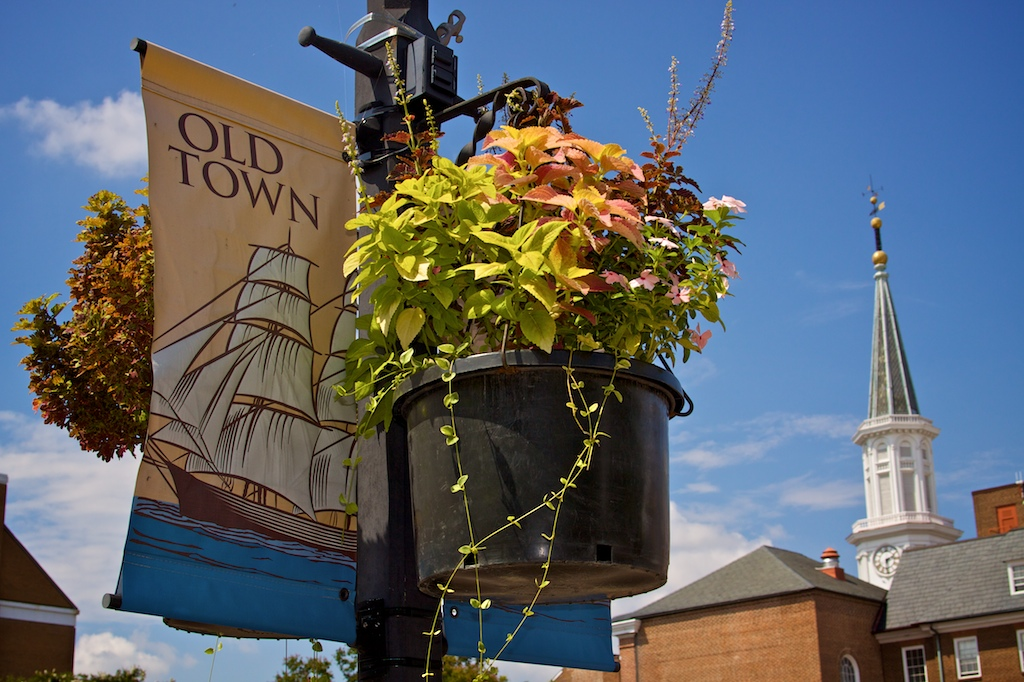
Signs hang from the lamp posts of Old Town along King Street

Located just minutes from Washington, D.C., Old Town is situated in the eastern and southeastern area of the city along the Potomac River. It was originally laid out in 1749, making it the oldest section of the City, and is a historic district. Old Town is chiefly known for its historic town houses, art galleries, antique shops, and restaurants as well as its unusual cobblestone streets and red brick sidewalks.

Some of the historic landmarks in Old Town include General Robert E. Lee's boyhood home, the Lee-Fendall House, a replica of George Washington's townhouse, Gadsby's Tavern, the Stabler-Leadbeater Apothecary Shop, the Hollensbury Spite House, and the Torpedo Factory art studio complex. River cruise boats and street entertainers frequent the large plaza at the foot of King Street; the Mount Vernon Trail also passes through. Old Town is laid out on a grid plan of substantially square blocks. The opening of the Washington Metro King Street station in 1983 led to a spurt of new hotel and office building development in western Old Town, and gentrification of townhouse areas west of Washington Street which were previously an African-American community.

Market Square in Old Town is believed to be one of the oldest continuously operating marketplaces in the United States (since 1753), and, during colonial times, was the site of a slave market. Today it contains a large fountain, extensive landscaping, and a farmers' market each Saturday morning. Alexandria City Hall, including the mayor's office, is adjacent to Market Square.

A statue of a lone Confederate soldier that marked the spot at which Confederate States of America (CSA) units from Alexandria left to join the Confederate Army at the beginning of the American Civil War stood in the center of the intersection of Washington and Prince streets for 131 years until June 2, 2020. M. Casper Buberl cast the piece, entitled Appomattox, in 1889. The United Daughters of the Confederacy, which owns the statue, had the monument removed because vandals had recently damaged other segregation-era statues during nationwide demonstrations.

== Eisenhower Valley ==
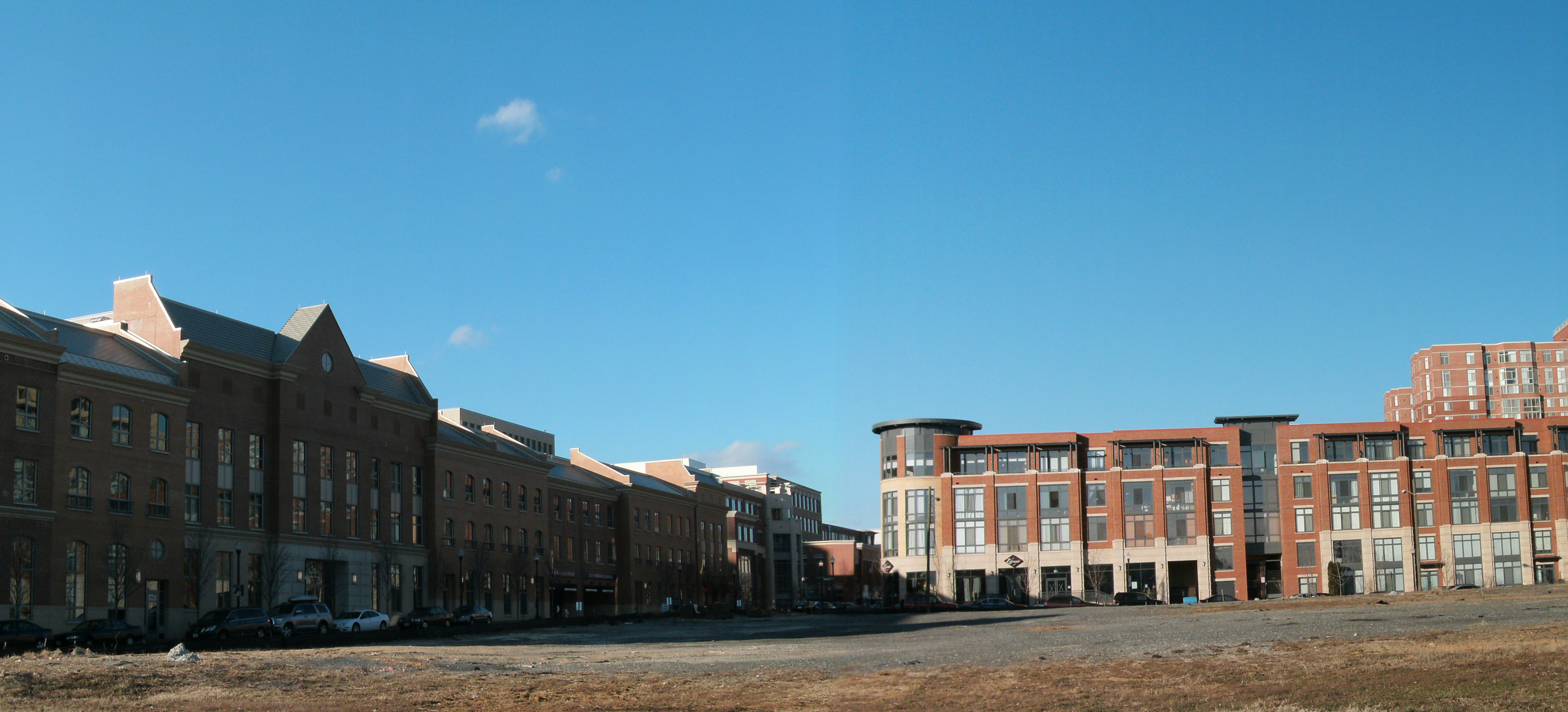
The Carlyle neighborhood seen under construction in 2009

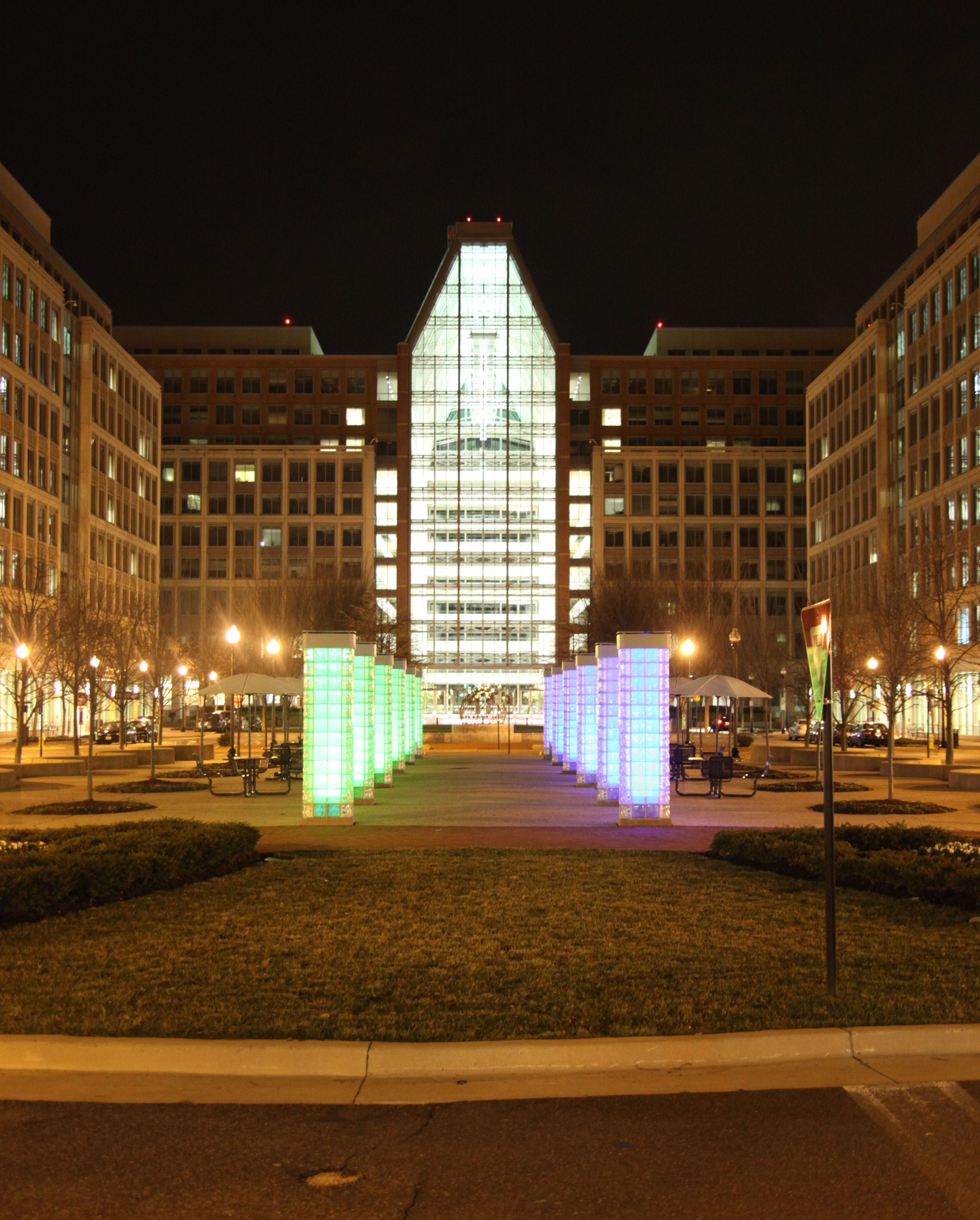
United States Patent and Trademark Office

=== History ===
Evidence of prehistoric Indian settlement in the Eisenhower Valley area has been turned up by numerous archaeological surveys. The area today known by that name was once known as the Cameron Valley, and runs along Cameron Run; it was the site of the Cameron Mills, which were built in the 1790s and produced flour, meal, and feed. The firm of Roberts and Hunt operated the twin mills, beginning in the middle of the 19th century and continuing until 1919. One of the mills was converted to a pumping station by the Alexandria Water Company in 1851, and remained active until the mid-20th century. The western mill was destroyed by fire in 1928. Portions of the corridor are among those which were annexed by Alexandria from neighboring Fairfax County in 1915 and 1952. These lands include a portion of the site of the Bush Hill plantation, which was owned by Richard Marshall Scott and his descendants for close to 200 years. The house is located along Backlick Run. It was built by Josiah Watson, but was purchased by Scott in 1797.

In 1850, a portion of the land was cleared by the Orange and Alexandria Railroad for the creation of a track line. Bush Hill remained a private residence until World War II, when the United States government leased it for the detention of Adolf Hitler's confidant Ernst Hanfstaengl. After the war, the house became a preschool, but it was burned by arsonists in 1977; the vandals were never identified. Today a historical marker notes the site of the house.

Developer Hubert N. Hoffman saw potential in the neighborhood, and had begun buying up land in 1958 in anticipation of the construction of the Capital Beltway; today a large portion of the Eisenhower East site is covered by the Hoffman Town Center development. Hoffman himself was so identified with the site that at his death in 2002 he was interred in a mausoleum behind a Holiday Inn, which he had built in the neighborhood in 1966. This was removed in 2014 when plans began to expand the hotel.

By the 1980s, the character of the valley was largely industrial. It contained a scrap yard, a rail yard, a sanitation facility, an energy plant, and a jail. Several landowners banded together to lobby for a new interchange with the Beltway, and by the mid-1990s the area had been transformed with a large amount of commercial and residential development. A small area plan was adopted by the city in 2013 to encourage further transformation of the neighborhood.

=== Areas within Eisenhower Valley ===
The far west of the Eisenhower Valley extends from the western border of the city eastward to the Alexandria National Cemetery. The main road in the area is Eisenhower Avenue, named for president Dwight D. Eisenhower.

Alexandria's Master Plan divides the city into Small Area Plans. From west to east, the Valley's plan areas are:

- Eisenhower West - between just west of Van Dorn and Holmes Run creek on the east
- A portion falling under the Seminary Hill/Strawberry Hill plan are from Holmes Run on the west to the western edge of the WMATA Alexandria Yard
- King Street Metro/Eisenhower area, which despite its name does not include the King Street metro station, includes the WMATA Alexandria Yard and stretches east to Telegraph Road (Virginia State Route 611)
- Eisenhower East including Carlyle, from Telegraph Road on the west to Four Mile Run creek, which is the western edge of the Wilkes Street Cemetery Complex.

=== Eisenhower West ===
This area's western boundary is just west of Van Dorn Street. The Animal Welfare League of Alexandria is quartered here. The area is served by the Van Dorn Street station of the Washington Metro.

==== Cancelled plans ====
The Transportation Security Administration announced plans to move its headquarters to the Victory Center (the former U.S. Army Materiel Command headquarters, built in 1973 and vacated in 2003), located in the west end of the Valley, in 2015, a move that was met with acclaim from city leaders, as it was planned that the building would become the centerpiece of an economic transformation of the neighborhood. The move was put on hold by a federal judge, however, who accused the General Services Administration of ignoring its own rules in contracting the lease; the action has caused great unhappiness among local government circles. In 2017, the TSA lease was awarded to the developer of a new building in Springfield, Virginia, officially ending the proposal for the TSA HQ to move to the Eisenhower Valley.

A large sports and entertainment complex was proposed for Hensley Park in 2013, but this was rejected by city planners.

=== Seminary Hill/Strawberry Hill ===
The part of the Valley within the Seminary Hill/Strawberry Hill planning area is the location of Cameron Run Regional Park, and adjacent to the park is a small lake, Lake Cook, named for former Director of Transportation and Environmental Services for Alexandria, Dayton L. Cook.

=== Eisenhower East and Carlyle ===
Eisenhower East and Carlyle together form an important commercial area. Carlyle is a commercial area contiguous with Eisenhower East, it is included in the same (Eisenhower East) plan.

The Alexandria African American Heritage Park and Wilkes Street Cemetery Complex are located in this area, which is served by the Eisenhower Avenue station of the Washington Metro.

Carlyle is home to the United States Patent and Trademark Office, the National Inventors Hall of Fame, and the Albert V. Bryan U.S. Courthouse, and a new home for the National Science Foundation, opened in 2017.

== Southwest Quadrant ==
=== Wilkes Street Cemetery Complex ===
Bordering the Eisenhower Valley on the east is the Wilkes Street Cemetery Complex, founded in 1804 to provide local churches a space for burials, as the city's Common Council declared a moratorium on burials within the city limits in that year. The complex grew up around the Penny Hill Cemetery, which had been in existence since being founded as a burial place for the indigent in 1795. Several church cemeteries were formed, including those associated with St. Paul's Episcopal Church and the Old Presbyterian Meeting House. These were soon joined by others formed by local cemetery associations, and today there are 13 cemeteries, many active, located in the complex. Most notable among these are Alexandria National Cemetery and St. Paul's Cemetery; the cemetery of the Agudas Achim Congregation is located here as well, as are those of Christ Church and Washington Street United Methodist Church. Other active cemeteries include Bethel Cemetery; Home of Peace Cemetery, the first Jewish cemetery in Alexandria; and Trinity United Methodist Cemetery. Abandoned and inactive cemeteries include the Black Baptist Cemetery, today the Alexandria African American Heritage Park; Douglas Memorial Cemetery, a black cemetery currently maintained by the city; and the Penny Hill Cemetery, of which few traces have survived since its closure in 1976.

== Rosemont ==
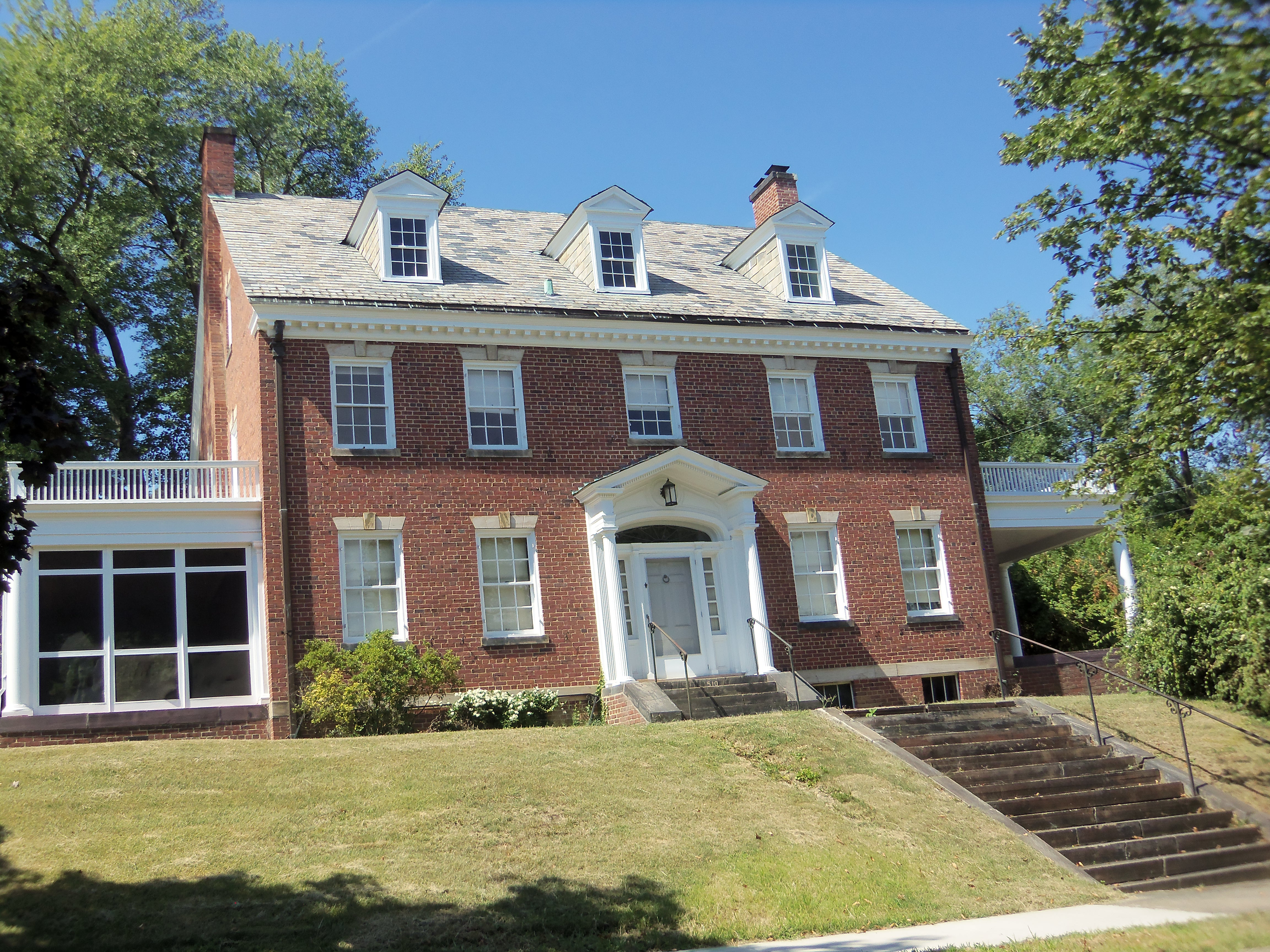
A house in the Rosemont neighborhood

Just to the west of Old Town is the city's oldest planned residential expansion. Called by its creators Rosemont in honor of a Philadelphia, Pennsylvania neighborhood of the same name, Rosemont was developed between 1900 and 1920. Rosemont extends from the foot of Shuter's Hill, crowned by the George Washington National Masonic Memorial, away to the north for a dozen blocks to the edge of Del Ray. Originally intended as a "streetcar suburb" connected to Washington, D.C. and George Washington's home at Mount Vernon by electric railroad, Rosemont, instead, became closely integrated into the life of the core of Alexandria. Much of Rosemont is included in a historic district listed on the National Register of Historic Places that was intended to focus attention on the neighborhood's role as a showcase of early 20th century home building styles. The intact original street plan reflects suburban planning ideals of the early 1900s City Beautiful movement. Television weatherman Willard Scott grew up here.

Ivy Hill Cemetery is located at the edge of the neighborhood.

Rosemont is frequently grouped with the neighboring North Ridge neighborhood.

== North Ridge ==
North Ridge, in northern Alexandria near its boundary with Arlington County, is roughly bordered by W. Glebe Road to the north, Russell Road to the east, Braddock Road to the south, and Quaker Lane to the west, although it does not contain the Parkfairfax development to its northeast. North Ridge takes its name from the high ground south and west of an escarpment that separates it from Arlandria and the Four Mile Run valley to the north, and Del Ray to the east. Within the area that comprises North Ridge are the neighborhoods of Beverley Hills, Jefferson Park, Braddock Heights, Timber Branch, Parkfairfax, Monticello Park, Beverley Estates, and Oak Crest. The North Ridge community lies within the original 10-mile (16 km) square of the District of Columbia, ceded back to Virginia in 1846.

North Ridge is a residential area with homes of numerous styles with mostly single-family two-story and basement houses that were largely developed in the period of the 1930s through the early 1960s. The Lower School of private St. Stephen's & St. Agnes School and Alexandria Country Day School are located in the Jefferson Park section of North Ridge. This neighborhood includes many houses of worship as well as one of Virginia's eight Scottish Rite temples, a Masonic order. Alexandria City Fire Station #203 is located at Cameron Mills Rd & Monticello Blvd and an Alexandria Police Satellite Facility borders North Ridge located at King St & W. Braddock Rd. On the edge of the community is a small shopping center called Fairlington anchored by a national-chain drug store and a Cadillac car dealership. North Ridge students attend George Mason, Charles Barrett and MacArthur Elementary Schools and feed into George Washington Middle School and Alexandria City High School. Parks include Monticello Park, Beverley Park and Robert Leider Park. Also within the community is the house Mount Ida, initially built by Charles Alexander between 1800 and 1808 and later home to a community of Roman Catholic nuns, the Sisters of the Holy Cross.

== The Berg ==
At the northern limits of Old Town are the remnants of a historic, predominantly African-American community known by its inhabitants as "The Berg." The area was settled in 1861 by refugees fleeing from enslavement in the area around Petersburg, Virginia and was known as Petersburg or Grantsville. In 1915 the neighborhood encompassed several blocks from 1st St. to Bashford Lane and Royal St. to the waterfront railroad line. Built in 1945, a 260-unit public housing complex in the neighborhood covers several blocks in what is now Old Town Alexandria.

Two of the Berg's most prominent landmarks are blocks of units within this complex. The James Bland Homes, built in 1954, are named after an African-American musician and songwriter. The second are the Samuel Madden Homes, named after the second African-American pastor of the Alfred Street Baptist Church.

Over the years, the origins of the Berg's name were forgotten, and many assumed it referred to the monolithic, iceberg-like buildings of this apartment complex. It was mentioned in the movie Remember the Titans, which dramatizes the integration of city public schools in the 1970s.

== Parker-Gray ==
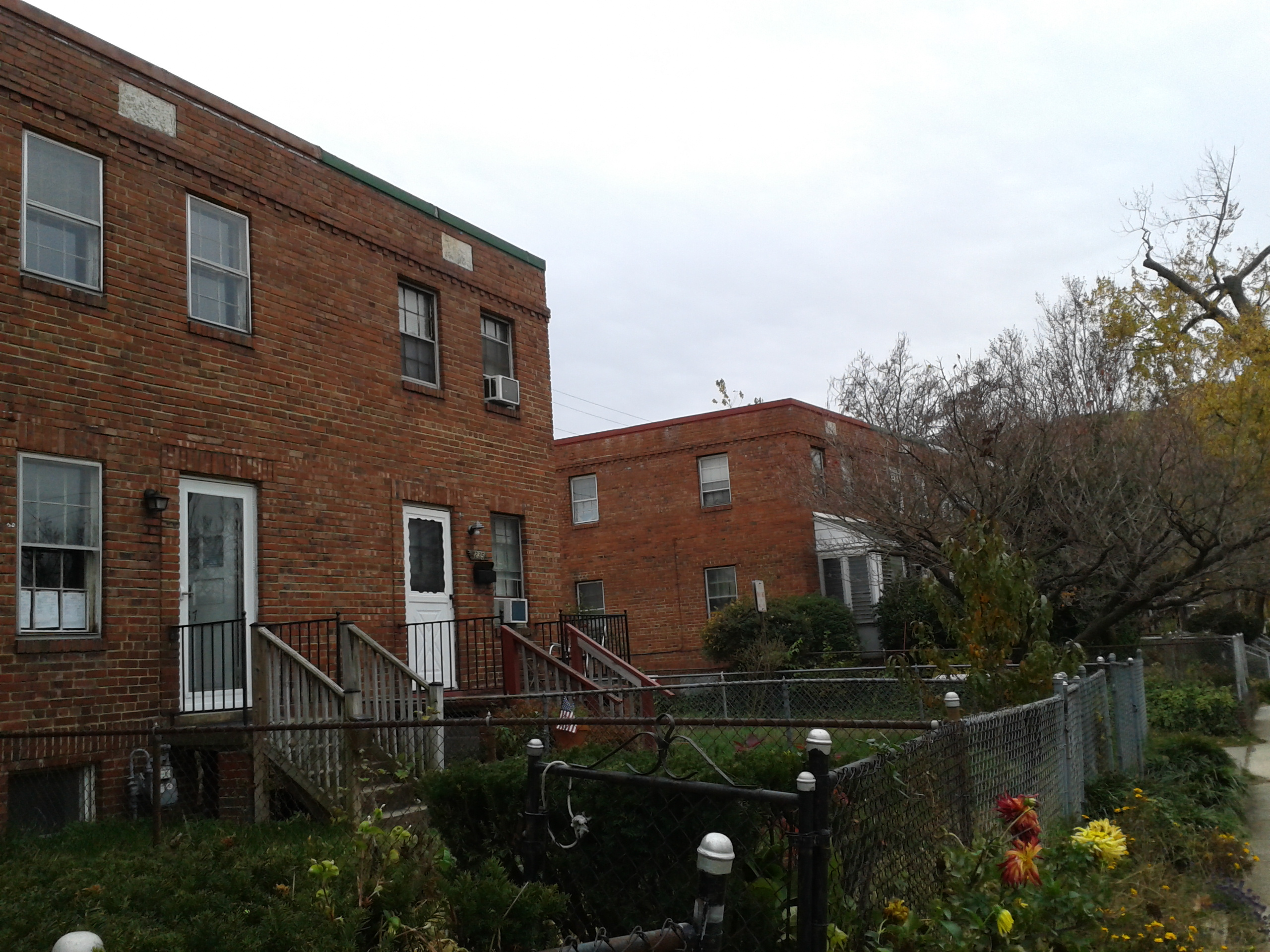
Rowhouses in the Parker-Gray neighborhood

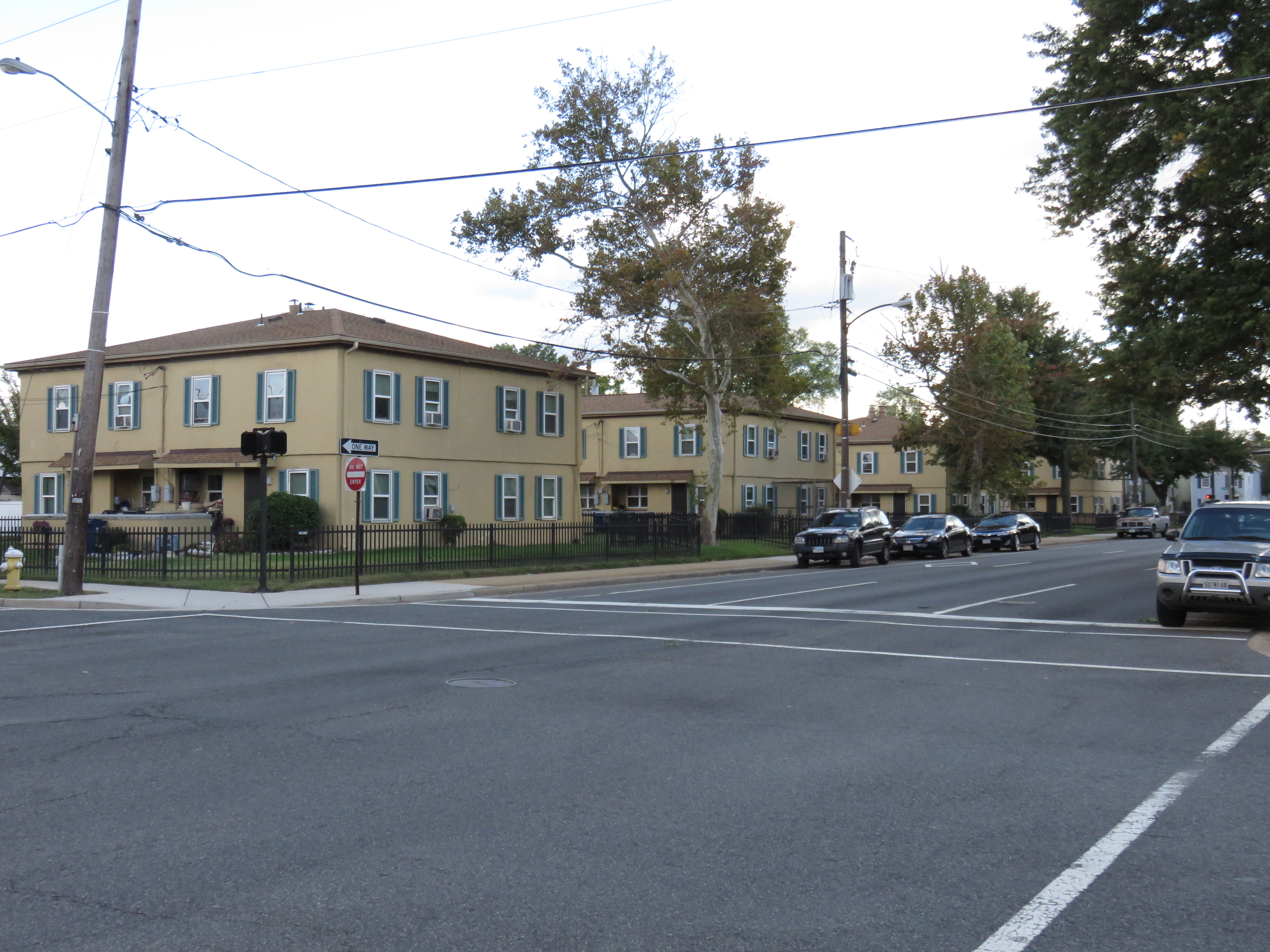
Ramsey homes demolished in 2018

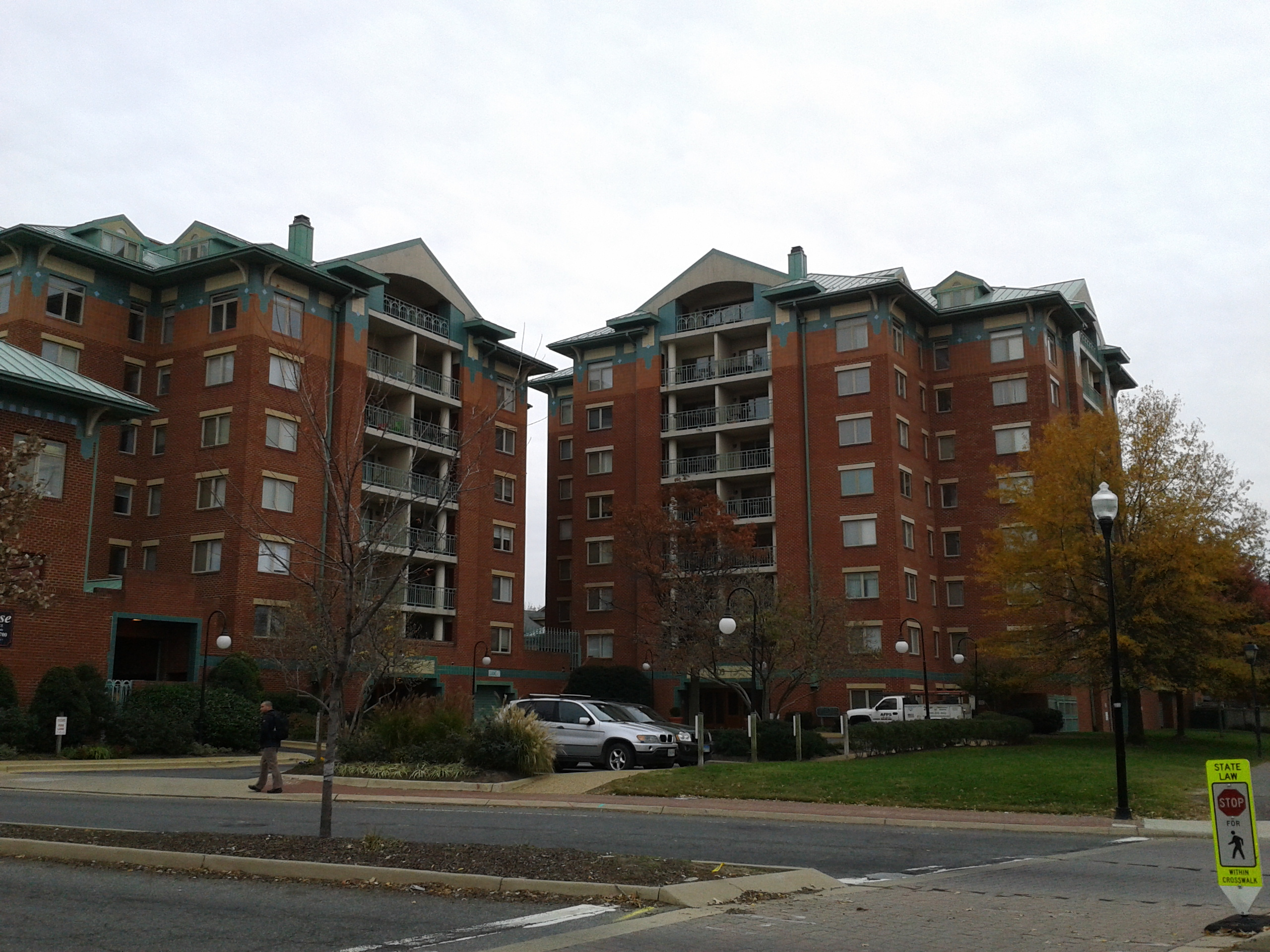
Apartment buildings near the Braddock Road Station of the Washington Metro

The Parker-Gray neighborhood is located in the northwestern quadrant of the Old Town Alexandria street grid as it was laid out in 1797. More recently known as "Uptown", it mostly consists of small row houses and town houses, but there are also many commercial buildings. It is the largest historically black neighborhood in the city.

The area takes its name from the Parker Gray School, originally an elementary school which opened in 1920 and which was named to honor Sarah A. Gray, principal of Hallowell School for Girls and John Parker, principal of Snowden School for Boys, two local segregated schools. The school later became Parker-Gray High School, the first segregated high school for black students in the city. It was opened in 1950 at the instigation of Charles Hamilton Houston; previously, black students had to travel into the District of Columbia for high school classes. After desegregation the school became Parker-Gray Middle School; it closed in 1979, and was later torn down and replaced with a row of townhouses. The site of the school is today home to the headquarters of Alexandria City Public Schools, and is marked with a plaque; a new plaque was unveiled in 2015 to correct errors on the previous one at the site.

Buildings in Parker-Gray are representative of a number of popular 19th-century architectural styles including Greek Revival and Queen Anne. There are also many units of public housing, built between the early 1940s and 1959 as Colonial Revival-style row houses. Many of the structures are residential, but there are also a large number of commercial buildings, including a number of warehouses; several churches are also listed within the district boundaries. More recent architectural styles visible in the neighborhood include Art Deco and Streamline Moderne.

Parker-Gray was primarily rural for much of the eighteenth century; one of the few structures which stood there was the powder magazine for the city of Alexandria, built far away from the center of town as a potential fire hazard; this was demolished around 1818 as more buildings began to be constructed in its vicinity. A handful of houses were built at the beginning of the nineteenth century. The most prominent of these was Colross, which has since been moved to Princeton, New Jersey; no trace of it, or any of the other houses, remains visible. Railroad tracks had been laid through the neighborhood by the time of the American Civil War, during which the Union Army made use of many vacant sites for a variety of purposes. No trace of these remains, either. During and after the war what is today Parker-Gray became a haven for freed blacks and escaped slaves. By the middle of the twentieth century, it had become a well-respected middle-class neighborhood. Samuel Wilbert Tucker led a sit-in at the Kate Waller Barrett Library in the neighborhood in August 1939; Tucker's house still stands in the district. More recently, a large new public housing development was built in the neighborhood in 1988. Parker-Gray saw much growth beginning in the mid-1980s; many of the newer buildings were constructed in a style which blends in with the older structures which surround them.

Portions of the neighborhood were added to the National Register of Historic Places as the Uptown–Parker–Gray Historic District in 2010; the district contains close to one thousand contributing buildings and structures. The Parker-Gray District Board of Architectural Review oversees historic preservation efforts in the community. The neighborhood was initially designated a local historic district in 1984; residents, concerned that the designation would severely limit their ability to repair and remodel their homes, successfully petitioned the United States Department of Housing and Urban Development for redress. The Alexandria Black History Museum is located in the neighborhood, in the old Robert Robinson library building, constructed in 1940 as a result of the 1939 sit-in.

Basketball player Earl Lloyd, the first black player in the National Basketball Association, was a native of Parker-Gray. More recently, a number of champion boxers have trained at the Charles Houston Recreation Center.

The area around the Braddock Road station of the Washington Metro has been the subject of heavy development in recent years. It is currently the subject of a redevelopment plan from the city. The neighborhood is also served by the Fayette station of the Metroway. A portion of the area slated for redevelopment has been referred to as "Black Rosemont".

== Del Ray ==
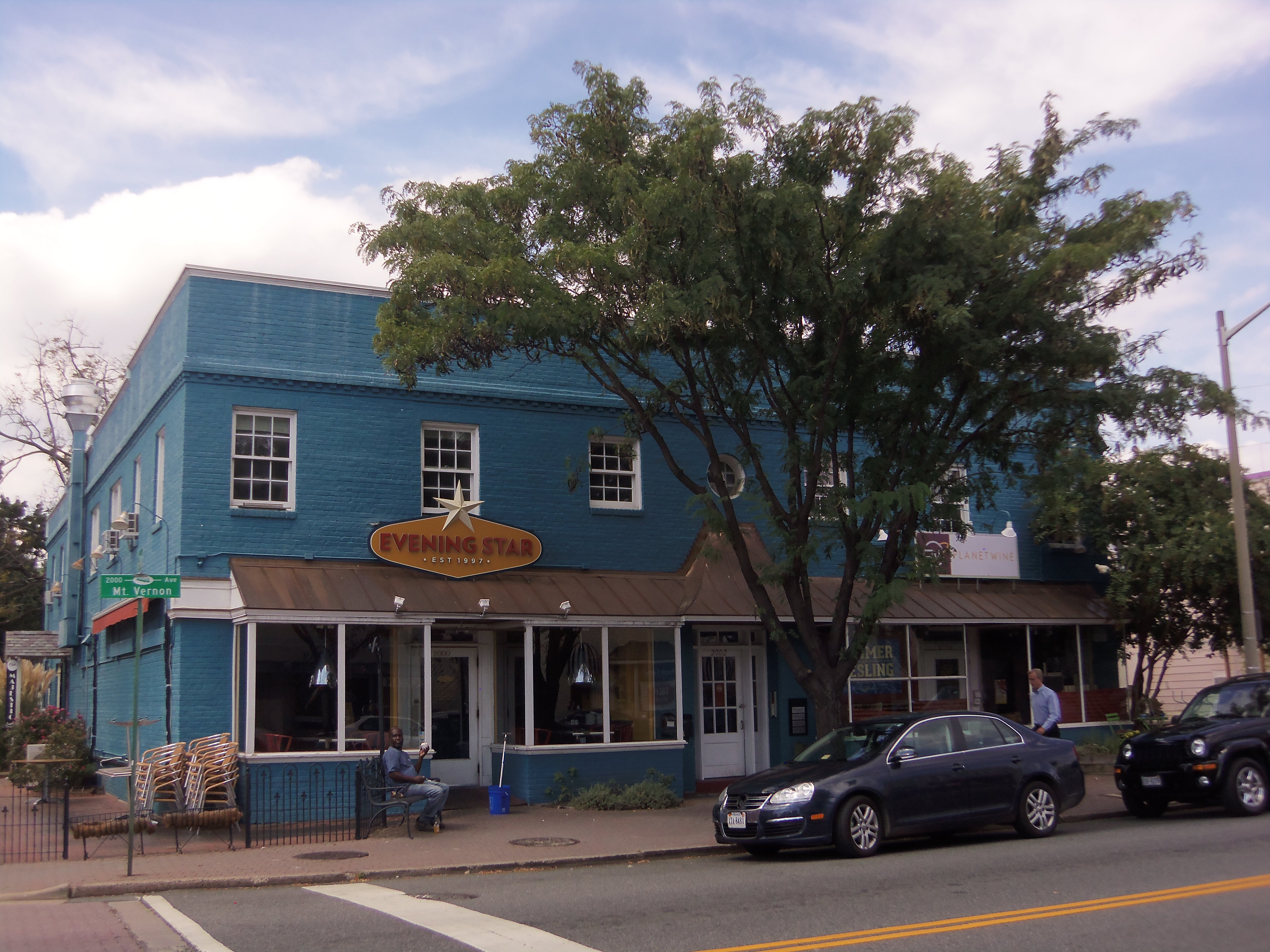
A restaurant in Del Ray in 2013

The area to the northwest of Old Town, much of which was once in the separate town of Potomac, is today known as Del Ray. The "Del Ray" name originally belonged to one of several subdivisions (including Hume Springs, Mount Ida, and Saint Elmo's) that are considered part of modern Del Ray. Del Ray is defined by its local citizens association as the area bounded on the south by Braddock Road, on the west by Russell Road, on the north by East Glebe and West Glebe Roads, on the east by U.S. Route 1, and on the southeast by the CSX rail tracks between Route 1 and Braddock Road.

The historic communities of Del Ray and St. Elmo's originated in early 1894, when developer Charles Wood organized them on a grid pattern of streets running north–south and east–west. Wood had purchased the 254 acres (103 ha) comprising Del Ray for $38,900, while the 39 acres (16 ha) of St. Elmo were purchased for $15,314. Del Ray originally contained six east–west streets and five north–south. All were identical in width, except Mt. Vernon Avenue, which was approximately twenty feet wider. St. Elmo's, a smaller tract, was laid out in a similar pattern, but with only four east–west streets and one running north–south. Between the two neighborhoods was the St. Asaph Racetrack, a once-controversial gambling establishment that shut down after a 1904 raid; the location of the racetrack caused some deviation from a pure-grid street pattern, which remains to this day.

By 1900, Del Ray contained approximately 130 people, and St. Elmo's 55. In 1908, the tracts of Del Ray, St. Elmo's, Mt. Ida, and Hume Springs were incorporated into the town of Potomac, which by 1910 had a population of 599; by 1920 it contained 1,000; by 1928 it had 2,355 residents. Now more than 20,000 people live in Del Ray.

The community, while still diverse, has experienced substantial gentrification since the development of the nearby Potomac Yard Shopping Center in the mid-1990s. Del Ray draws tens of thousands of people from around the Washington, D.C. region during its annual Art on the Avenue main street festival the first Saturday in October.

Southern Del Ray is served by the Braddock Road Metro station, while the Potomac Yard station now serves more northern portions of the area. The Metroway, a bus rapid transit system connecting the Braddock Road Metro station with Crystal City station in Arlington with stops along the Potomac Yard/Route 1 corridor adjoining Del Ray, opened in 2014 and has seen much use since.

Mount Vernon Community School, grades K-5, and George Washington Middle School, grades 6-8, are located in Del Ray. Both are part of the Alexandria City Public Schools system.

Del Ray was the site of the Congressional baseball shooting, during which a gunman opened fire on a baseball field where the Republican Party team was practicing for the annual Congressional Baseball Game, injuring five people including U.S. Representative Steve Scalise.

== Potomac Yard ==
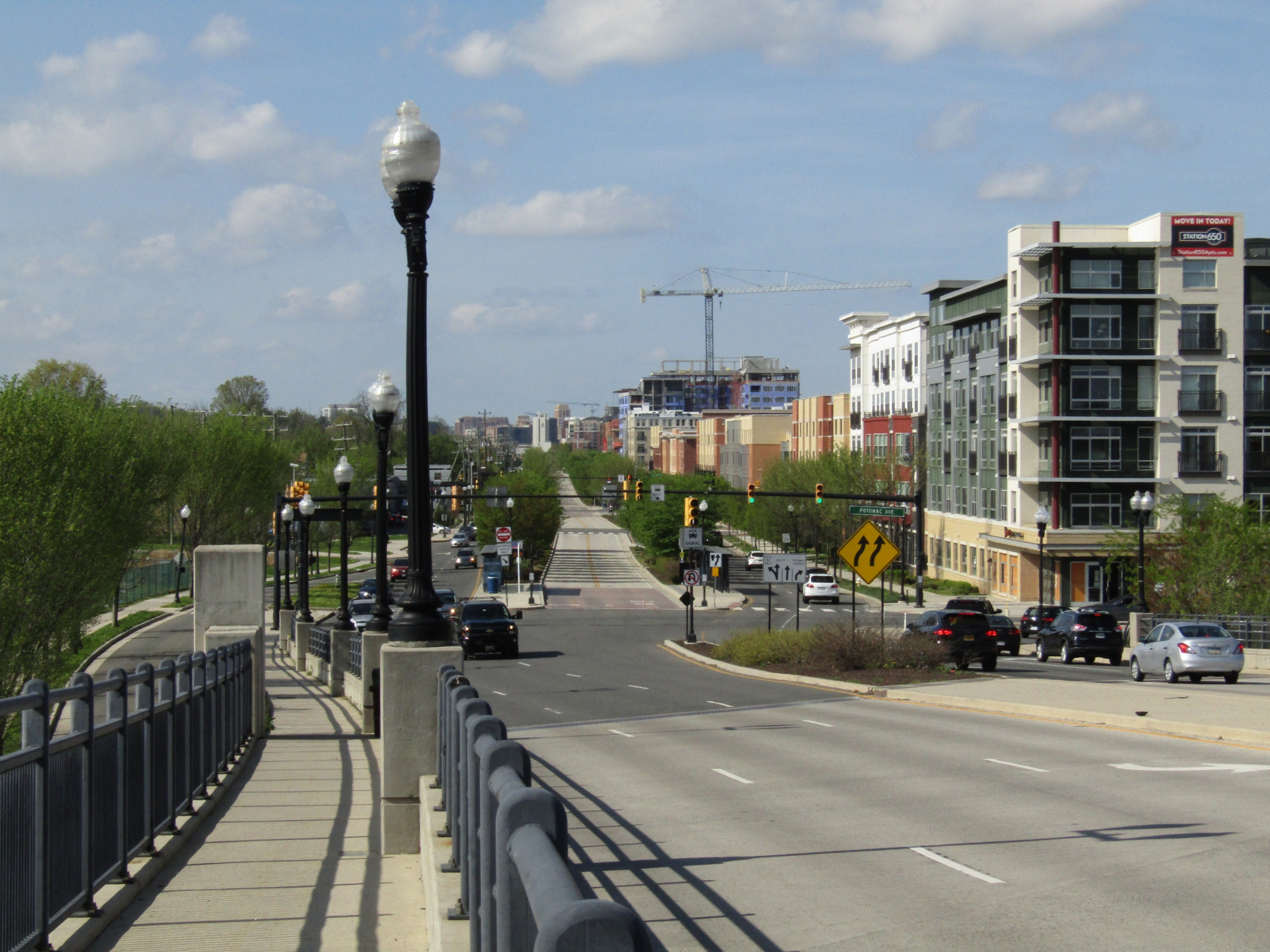
Potomac Yard with recently-built residential buildings to the right and the Crystal City skyline visible in the distance.

Located across U.S. Route 1 from Del Ray is the Potomac Yard area, formerly home to one of the busiest rail yards on the Eastern Seaboard of the United States. Today, it includes a large shopping center and mixed-use and residential development. A Potomac Yard Metro station is planned to open in 2021. Potomac Yard was included as one of the components of "National Landing" (along with parts of southeastern Arlington), a re-branding that was unveiled in 2018 when Arlington was announced as the location for part of the Amazon HQ2 corporate headquarters project. At the same time, Virginia Tech announced plans for an Innovation Campus to be opened in the Oakville Triangle parcel, located on Route 1 between the residential areas of Del Ray and the commercial area of Potomac Yard.

== Arlandria ==
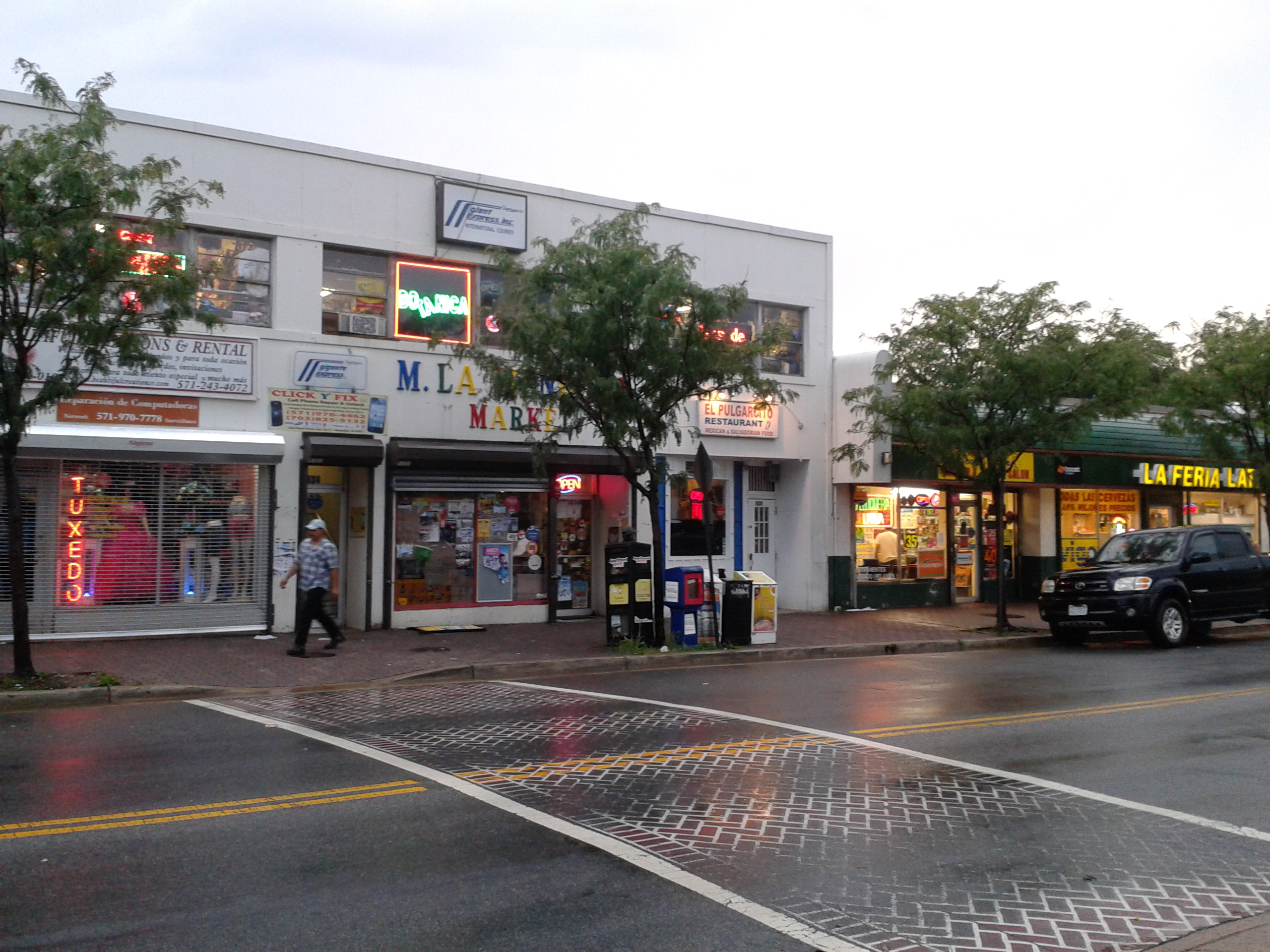
Storefronts along Mount Vernon Avenue in the Arlandria section of Alexandria reflect the large Hispanic population in the area

Arlandria is a neighborhood located in the north-eastern portion of Alexandria, adjacent to Del Ray. Its name is a portmanteau of the words "Arlington" and "Alexandria," reflecting its location on the border of Arlington County and Alexandria. The neighborhood's borders form a rough triangle bounded by Four Mile Run in the north, West Glebe Road to the south and south-west, and Route 1 to the east. Centered around Mount Vernon Avenue between Four Mile Run and West Glebe Road, it is home to many Hispanic, Thai, and Vietnamese-owned bakeries, restaurants, salons, and bookstores. An influx of Salvadorean immigrants into the neighborhood in the 1980s has earned it the nickname "Chirilagua," after the city on the Pacific coast of El Salvador. More development began in 2000, when the park at Four Mile Run was expanded. The area has long been viewed as working-class; recent efforts to change its character have led to fears of gentrification on the part of some residents. Arlandria is home to the Birchmere concert hall, the Alexandria Aces of the Cal Ripken Collegiate Baseball League, and St. Rita Roman Catholic Church, dedicated in 1949 and constructed in Gothic style from Virginia fieldstone and Indiana limestone.

Arlandria is the subject of a collection of city plans implemented by Alexandria's government beginning in 2003 to encourage development, and a handful of mixed-use projects have since been proposed. A Latino festival is held yearly at Four Mile Run Park celebrating the local community.

The song "Arlandria" by the American rock band Foo Fighters takes its name from the neighborhood, where the band's frontman, Dave Grohl, once lived. A reference to Arlandria also appears in the Foo Fighters song "Headwires."

== Clover-College Park ==
Clover-College Park is the neighborhood east of Quaker Lane, west of West Taylor Run, north of Duke Street and south of Janneys Lane. The neighborhood came to prominence when long time resident and future president Gerald R. Ford was selected as Vice President of the United States while still residing there. The Ford family continued residence there for several days after the Presidential swearing-in on August 9, 1974, while the Nixon family's possessions were moved from the White House. Many streets in the neighborhood are named for colleges and universities. Bishop Ireton High School, a Roman Catholic high school founded in 1964 by the Oblates of St. Francis DeSales, and named in honor of Peter Leo Ireton, Bishop of Richmond, is located in Clover-College Park, and members of the community's civic association conduct meetings there.

== West End ==
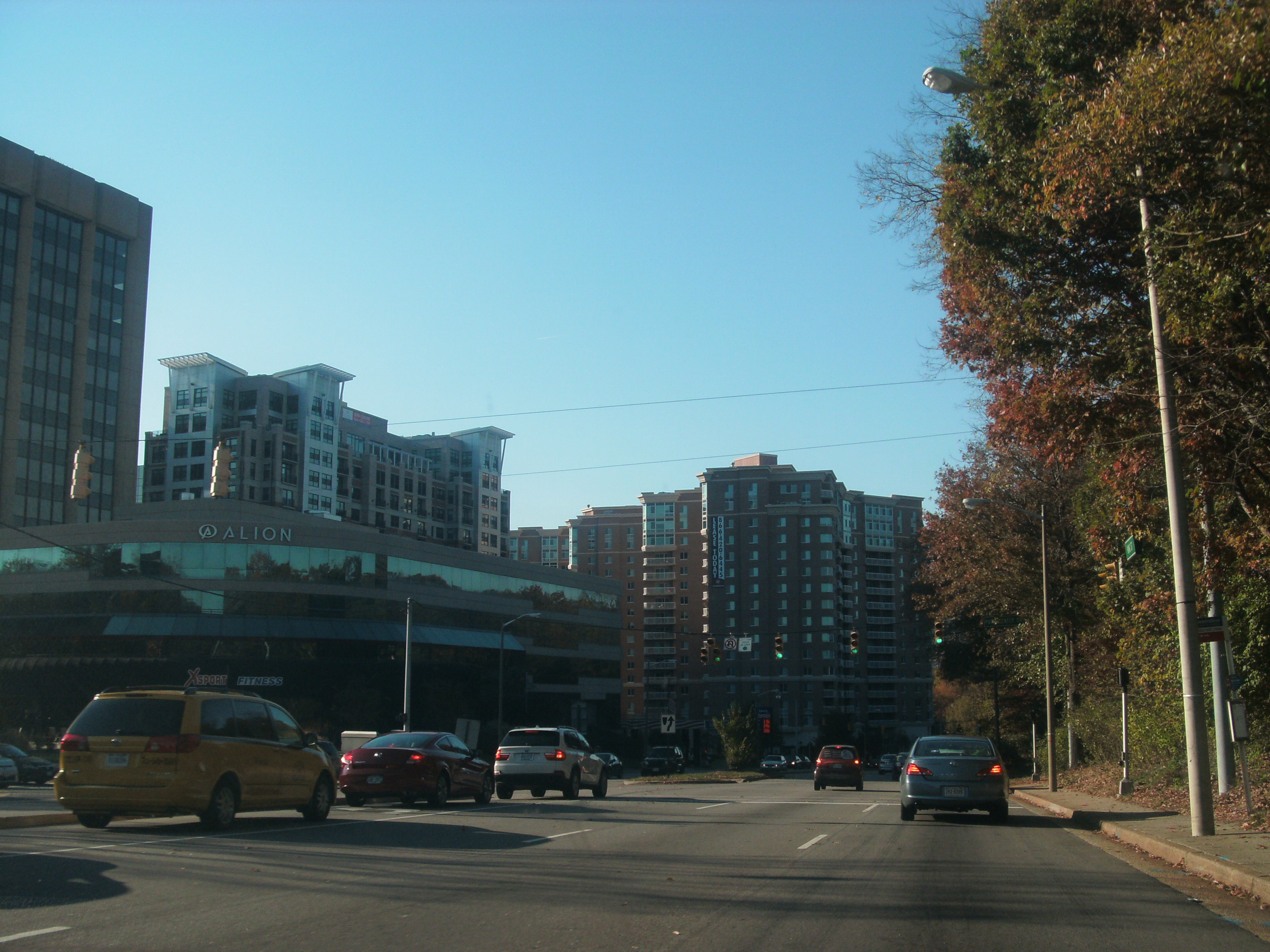
Skyscrapers in the West End of Alexandria

Alexandria's West End includes areas annexed from Fairfax County in the 1950s. It is the most typically suburban part of Alexandria, with a street hierarchy of winding roads and cul-de-sacs. The section of Duke Street in the West End is known for a high-density residential area known to locals as "Landmark" due to its close proximity to nearby Landmark Mall, and for its concentration of strip and enclosed shopping malls. Parts of Alexandria's West End have received an influx of immigrants from Ethiopia, Eritrea, Afghanistan and Pakistan, who have settled in the areas surrounding Seminary Road west of I-395.

The main areas of the West End all are west of Quaker Lane, a major north–south artery through the western side of Alexandria.

=== Seminary Hill ===
Seminary Hill is a mostly residential, single-family dwelling area near the Virginia Theological Seminary, Episcopal High School and St. Stephen's & St. Agnes School off of Seminary Road, ending in the area just west of the Inova Alexandria Hospital.

Alexandria City High School is located near the Seminary Hill neighborhood, and the school's desire to add spotlights to its football field has caused some controversy among its neighbors.

=== Lower Alexandria ===
South of the Duke Street corridor, Lower Alexandria is a collection of communities of small homes, rowhouses, and townhouses along with commercial and retail real estate, including the Foxchase Shopping Center. The section between Wheeler Ave. and Jordan St. is also known as the "Block." In the 1960s and 1970s, this section of Alexandria was also known because of Shirley Duke, a complex of 2,214 low-priced rental apartments, which became the Foxchase development in the early 1980s after five years of stagnancy. There are also areas of industrial businesses south of Duke Street, primarily off Wheeler Ave., South Pickett St., and South Van Dorn St. In the very southern part of this area is the Eisenhower Ave. corridor running parallel to the Capital Beltway (I-95/I-495) and west of Telegraph Rd, which is primarily industrial and commercial in nature. There has been development in apartments and townhouses in the area west of Telegraph Rd and east of Clermont Ave along with Class 1 Offices and national brand hotels. The Van Dorn Metro Station here provides access to Washington, D.C.

The city opened a new fire station on Eisenhower Ave. in 2015 to serve the West End, but did not staff it with firefighters because of a lack of funds. Norfolk Southern opened an ethanol transloading facility in the area in 2008, and has asked for approval from the city to expand its operations, a request which has generated some controversy among neighbors.

Several large development projects were announced for the portion of Lower Alexandria nearest Van Dorn St. station in the 2010s.

=== Cameron Station ===
Cameron Station is a planned community of Colonial-style townhouses and condominiums adjacent to the Landmark area of Alexandria. It is built on top of the remains of a United States Army installation, constructed as a quartermaster depot in 1942, which had previously housed the Defense Logistics Agency, and which closed in 1995. The site was chosen for its proximity to the Southern Railway tracks, and was at the time of construction outside the Alexandria city limits; its creation was overseen by Brigadier General Brehon B. Somervell. The former depot required decontamination prior to transfer; once cleanup was complete, much of the land was taken over by the United States Department of the Interior, which transferred it to the city of Alexandria. The city had planned to develop the area as a residential community after receiving the land, but a private group applied to use the former facility to construct a homeless shelter and job center; the proposal was opposed by a coalition led by local Congressman Jim Moran, and was denied by the United States Department of Health and Human Services. Work on the site, including the destruction of much of the military infrastructure, began in 1996.

Cameron Station is bounded by Duke Street to the north, and is otherwise surrounded by parks run by the city, including Ben Brenman park, which contains athletic fields, a dog park, and a picnic area, and which is home to the West End Farmer's Market; Armistead L. Boothe Park, named for an Alexandria native, which contains sports facilities and a picnic area; and Cameron Station Linear Park. Samuel W. Tucker Elementary School and Backlick Run adjoins the neighborhood. A small mixed-use business development contains retail space. Many streets in the neighborhood honor people who were associated with the former military installation, including General Somervell.

=== Landmark ===
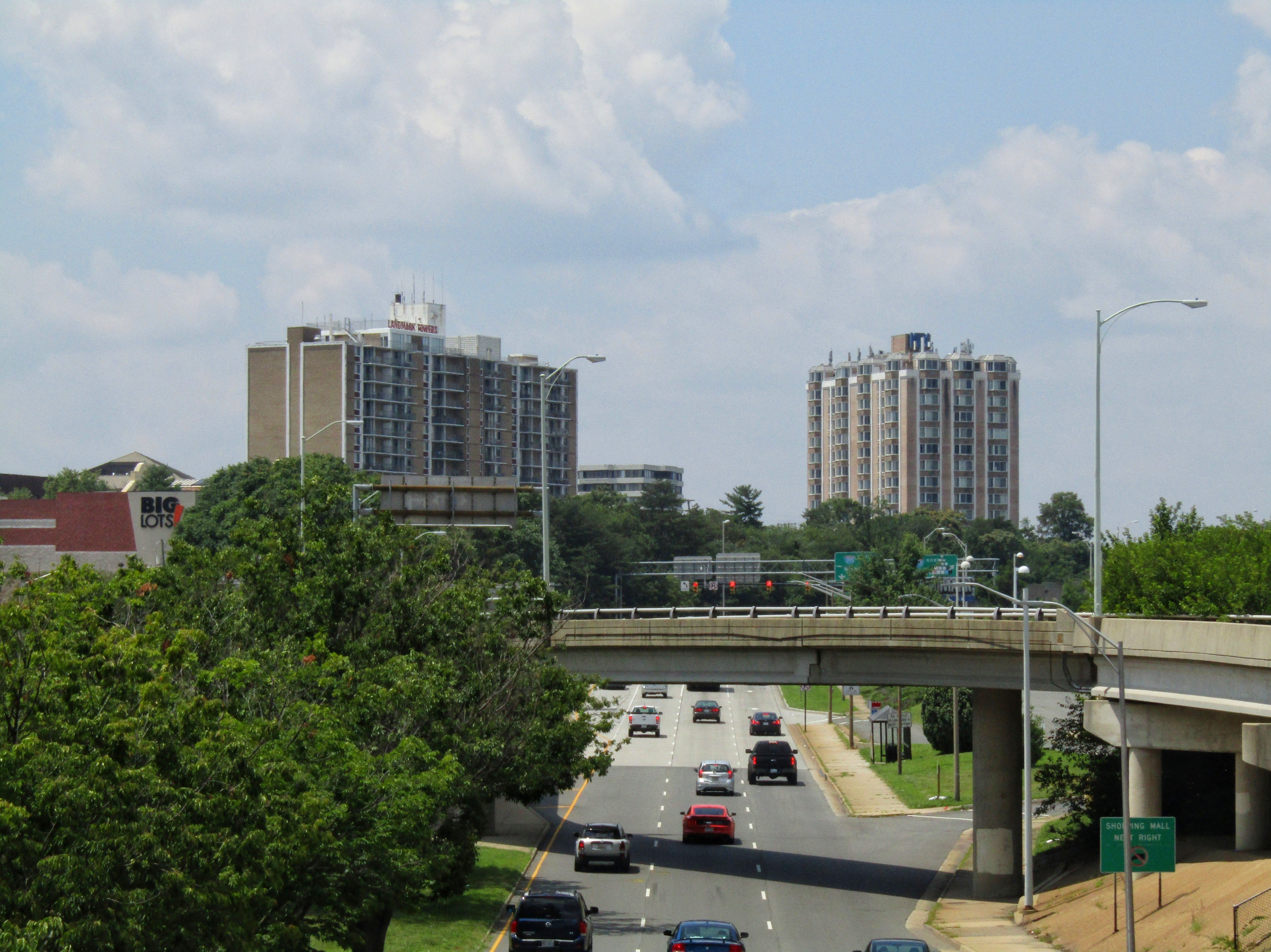
A pair of high-rise apartments in the Landmark area

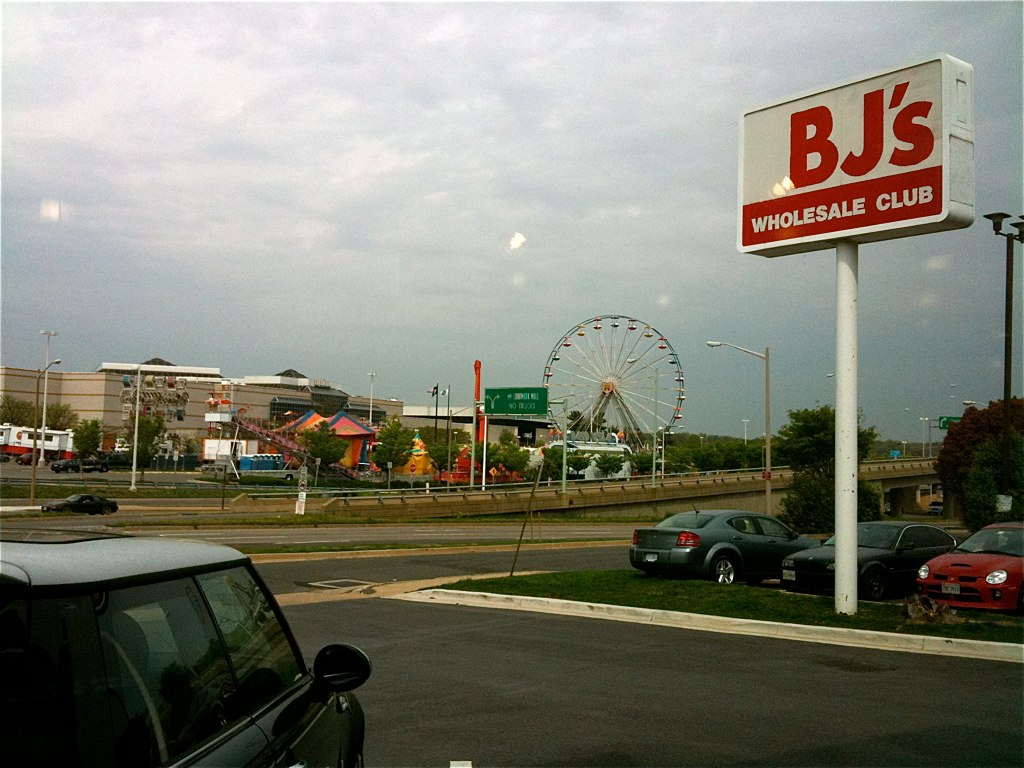
Landmark Mall (closed 2017), seen from across Duke Street in 2011

The Landmark area, which includes Seminary Valley, a large single family area developed in the 1950s, consists largely of garden-style apartments and condo-converted apartment high-rises as well as a number of townhome developments from the 1970s is west of North Pickett Street bordered by I-395/Van Dorn Street on the west and Seminary Road on the north. Other well known communities include Seminary Valley & Brookville (BVSV) and Cameron Station. The area is developed around the main branch of the Alexandria Library, the Charles E. Beatley Central Library, named for Alexandria's two-time mayor in the 1970s and early 80s, Chuck Beatley.

Landmark Mall, developed in the mid-1960s and redeveloped in the 1980s, was Alexandria's primary retail area for decades. The mall closed its doors in January 2017 and is currently awaiting redevelopment.

The city has adopted a small area plan dedicated to the redevelopment of Landmark Mall and the surrounding neighborhood. The plan calls for the addition of retail, residential, office and hotel development, and would provide for the construction of much mixed-use development in the neighborhood. It would also provide transportation connections to the Van Dorn Street Metro station and other locations. A flyover ramp from the I-395 Express Lanes to the northbound main lanes was built in the neighborhood in 2014.

=== Alexandria West ===
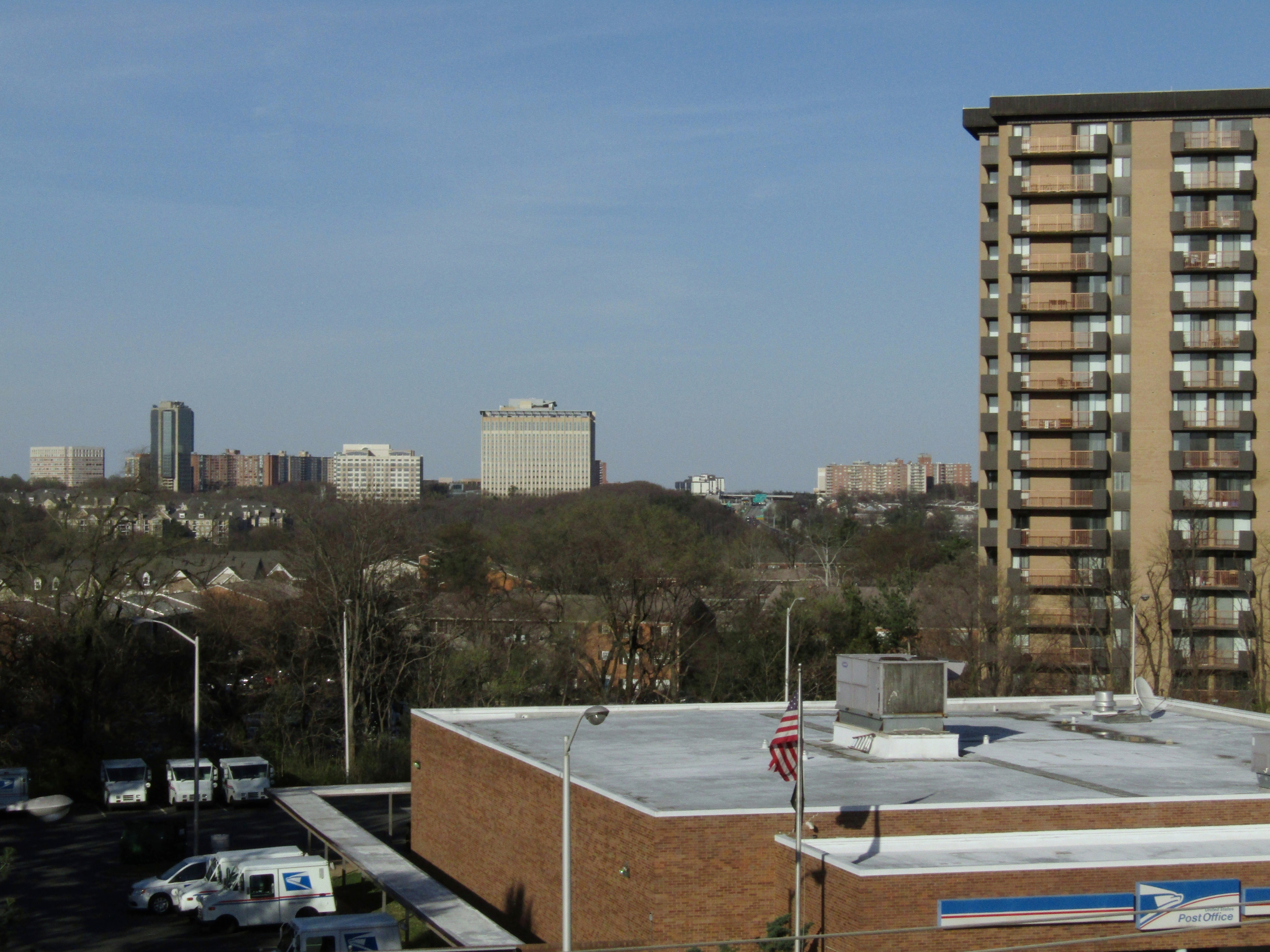
Alexandria West featuring a skyline in the background that includes the Mark Center Building, located just left of Interstate 395

Alexandria West refers to neighborhoods west of I-395 but within the city limits of Alexandria. Beauregard Street is the primary artery running north to south from King Street to Little River Turnpike (Duke Street's name changes west of I-395). Alexandria West includes a mix of development from town home communities, single family neighborhoods, three large senior citizen living centers, garden and high-rise apartments and condominiums. The Mark Center office development is a large commercial area in this community, which also includes the Alexandria Campus of the Northern Virginia Community College and its Rachel M. Schlesinger Concert Hall and Arts Center. The Mark Center is a 1,000,000-square-foot (93,000 m^{2}) office tower complex developed for the US Department of Defense and its Base Realignment and Closure initiative. It is an annex of US Army post Fort Belvoir. 6,300 federal office workers were expected to occupy the buildings.

There are two nature preserves that welcome visitors in Alexandria West. The 44-acre Winkler Botanical Reserve is a regional park operated by NOVA Parks, and the 50-acre Dora Kelly Nature Park along with its Buddy Ford Nature Center is Alexandria City's largest natural area for strolling, hiking and biking and provides year-round programs and exhibits on Alexandria's human and natural history. Also located in the Alexandria West area are the Hillwood and Stoneridge neighborhoods. The Stonegate development along West Braddock Road is the site of prehistoric settlement ranging from 3,500 to 1,000 B.C., making it the oldest known inhabited site in Alexandria; its discovery in 1992 led to the creation of the city's first archaeological preserve.

The Alexandria West area is slated for a great deal of redevelopment under a recent plan approved by the city of Alexandria. The plan, called the Beauregard Corridor Plan, has met with opposition from a number of local residential groups; concerns include the addition of density to the neighborhood and the loss of a large portion of the city's stock of affordable housing. Bus rapid transit is also slated to be added to the neighborhood, and will connect it to other neighborhoods both in the city and in surrounding jurisdictions.
