= Rosemont =

Rosemont may refer to:

== People ==
Rosemont is a surname. Notable people with this surname include:

- David A. Rosemont, American television producer
- Franklin Rosemont (1943–2009), American poet, artist, historian
- Norman Rosemont (1924–2018), American film producer
- Penelope Rosemont (born 1942), American visual artist, writer, publisher
- Romy Rosemont (born 1964), American actress

== Places ==
=== Canada ===
- Rosemont–La Petite-Patrie, a borough of Montreal, Quebec, Canada
- Rosemont—La Petite-Patrie (federal electoral district), a federal electoral district in Montreal, Quebec
- Rosemont (provincial electoral district), a provincial electoral district in Quebec
- Rosemont, Calgary, a neighbourhood in Calgary, Alberta, Canada

=== United States ===
- Rosemont, California
- Rosemont, Illinois
- Rosemont, Baltimore, a neighborhood in Baltimore, Maryland
- Rosemont, Maryland, in Frederick County
- Rosemont, Nebraska
- Rosemont, Hunterdon County, New Jersey
- Rosemont, Mercer County, New Jersey
- Rosemont, Ohio
- Rosemont, Pennsylvania

== Historic buildings ==
=== Australia ===
- Rosemont (Woollahra), a heritage-listed residence in New South Wales

=== United States ===
- Rosemont (Wilmington, Delaware), listed on the U.S. National Register of Historic Places
- Rosemont (Woodville, Mississippi), listed on the NRHP in Mississippi
- Rosemont (Briarcliff Manor, New York), an NRHP contributing property
- Rosemont Plantation, Waterloo, South Carolina, listed on the NRHP in South Carolina
- Rose Mont (Gallatin, Tennessee), listed on the NRHP in Tennessee
- Rosemont House (Waxahachie, Texas), listed on the NRHP in Ellis County, Texas
- Rosemont Historic District (Alexandria, Virginia), listed on the NRHP in Virginia
- Rosemont (Powhatan, Virginia), listed on the NRHP in Virginia
- Rosemont Historic District (Martinsburg, West Virginia), listed on the NRHP in West Virginia

== Other ==
- Rosemont (horse), an American Thoroughbred racehorse
- Rosemont College, a college in Rosemont, Pennsylvania
- Rosemont High School, a high school in Sacramento, California
- Rosemont Theatre, a concert hall in Rosemont, Illinois
  - Allstate Arena, a sports & entertainment arena in Rosemont, Illinois (formerly known as the Rosemont Horizon, or informally as Rosemont)

== See also ==
- Rosemont Historic District (disambiguation)
- Rosemont station (disambiguation)
- Rosemount (disambiguation)
- Rosenberg (disambiguation), the German analogue corresponding to red or rose + hill/mountain
