= Rosenberger =

Rosenberger is a Germanic-language family name derived from a toponym Rosenberg + the ending er, with the principal meaning "one from Rose Mountain". However, as a toponym Rosenberg (Rose Mountain), may have originally meant "death mountain" or simply "red hill", from rot + berg.

Today there are many people around the world whose central European ancestors adopted the surname, including many Germans. It is, additionally, used by many Ashkenazi Jews.

== People ==
- Adolf Rosenberger (1900–1967), German businessman and race car driver
- Carol Rosenberger (born 1933), classical pianist
- Cliff Rosenberger (born 1981), member of the Ohio House of Representatives
- Ian Rosenberger (born 1981), contestant on the American television series Survivor: Palau
- Ferdinand Rosenberger (1845–1899), German historian of physics
- Iris Rosenberger (born 1985), German-Turkish female swimmer
- James Rosenberger (1887–1946), U.S. Olympic athlete, 1912 Summer Olympics
- Jasmin Rosenberger (born 1985), German-Turkish female swimmer
- John Francis Rosenberger (1918–1977), American comic book artist
- Joseph Rosenberger (died 1996), founder of the first shatnes laboratory in America
- Joseph R. Rosenberger (1925–1993), author of nearly one hundred action-adventure books, including the Death Merchant series
- Katharina Rosenberger, Swiss composer and sound artist
- Martina Rosenberger, specialist in the waldzither
- Otto August Rosenberger (1800–1890), German astronomer
- Waldemar Rosenberger (1848–1918), Russian director of the Volapük Academy
- Johann Andreas Rosenberger (1847-1915), German surgeon

== Other uses ==
- Rosenberger (crater), lunar impact crater
- Rosenberger Building, a historic commercial building in Colfax, Indiana
- Rosenberger v. University of Virginia, Supreme Court of the United States case
- Rosenberger Hochfrequenztechnik (German: Rosenberger Hochfrequenztechnik), a German manufacturer high-frequency coaxial connectors

== See also ==
- Rosenberg (disambiguation)
