= Hume Springs, Virginia =

The Hume Springs neighborhood in Alexandria, Virginia, United States is a subdivision of red-brick row houses built in 1942. It has roughly 175 homes situated on four streets, East Reed Avenue, Dale Street, Edison Street, and Mark Drive. The neighborhood is bordered on the north and east by Four Mile Run Park, a 48.22-acre park that is the largest suburban park in the DC area. Directly north of Hume Springs is Four Mile Run stream and Arlington, Virginia. Directly east of Hume Springs is the Cora Kelly Recreation Center, and 1/2 mile further is Route 1 and Potomac Yard (location of the newest yellow line Metro station). Directly west of Hume Springs is Arlandria (also nicknamed Chirliagua), largely a Latino El Salvadorian community since the 1980s, and home to the Birchmere concert hall, the Alexandria Aces baseball team, Four Mile Run Farmers and Artisans Market, and St. Rita's Church, built in 1949 of stone Gothic architecture. To the south of Hume Springs is the historic Del Ray neighborhood with numerous restaurants, sidewalk seating, annual festivals and a popular farmer's market.

The homes of Hume Springs, along with other subdivisions in the area, were originally built to house the growing federal workforce during WWII. Many incoming migrants were living in trailer parks along Route 1, and included workers at Alexandria's Torpedo Factory and the United States Department of War employees who would later occupy The Pentagon, which was being built at the same time, less than 3 miles north of Hume Springs.

== History ==
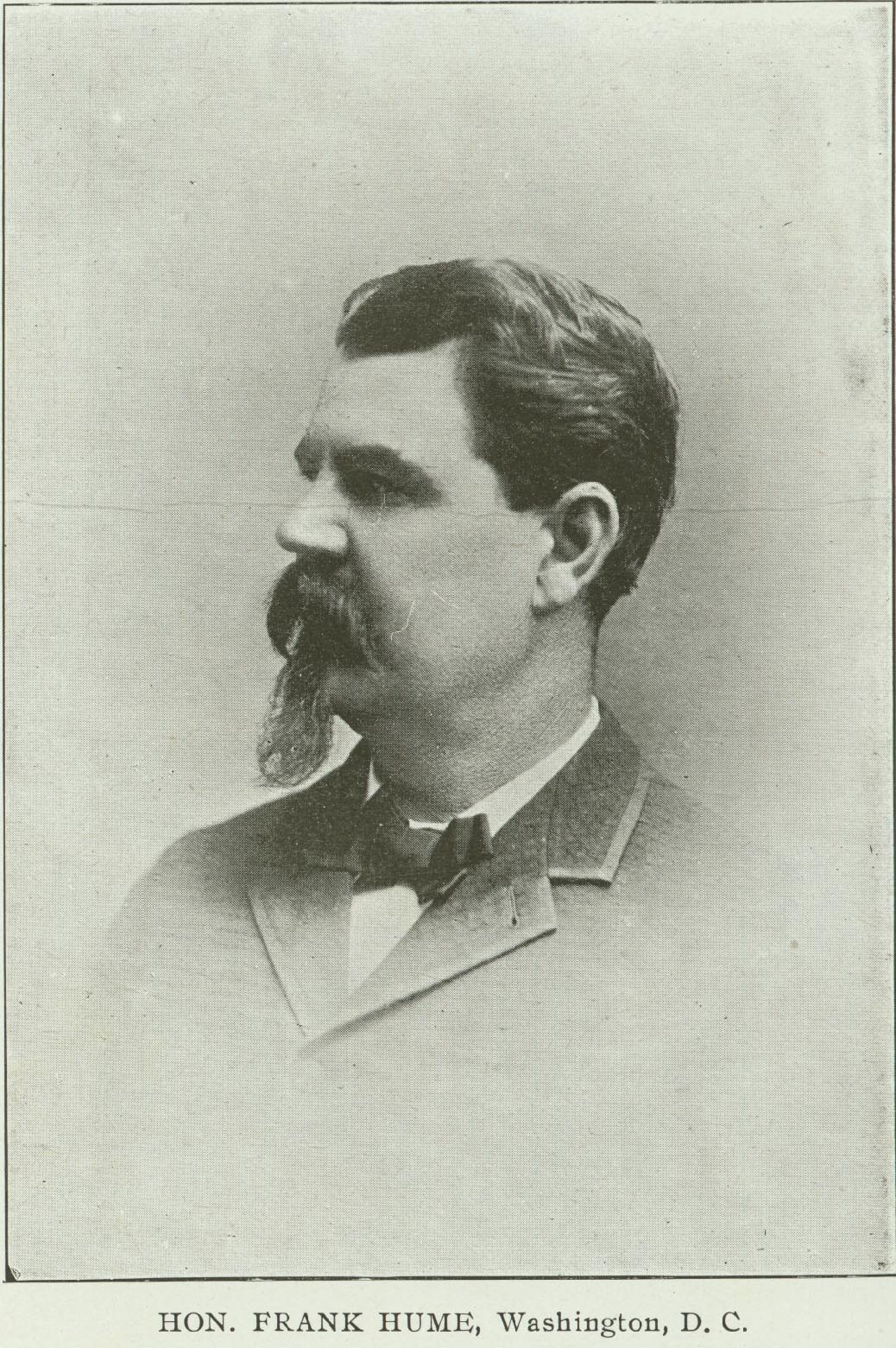
Frank Hume (1803–1906), namesake of Hume Springs

Hume Springs is named for one-time owner of the land Frank Hume (1803–1906). He was a confederate soldier and spy, and then a very successful grocer and liquor merchant in Washington who became a popular philanthropist.

Hume owned the Warwick Estate and surrounding land, where a spring was located and adorned with a large stone gazebo that was often visited in summer by wealthy guests from the City of Washington. The famous spring was located in the middle of old Mount Vernon Avenue at or very near the intersection with present-day Reed Avenue, but was eventually destroyed for road expansion and commercial development in the area.

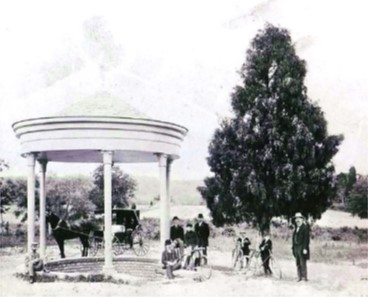
Hume Spring

Warwick Estate was especially popular for its Fourth of July celebrations that included fireworks and cannon fire overlooking the Potomac River. Frank Hume is also the namesake of the historic Hume School built in 1891 and located on Arlington Ridge, the oldest school building in Arlington County.

The land of the Hume Springs neighborhood was included in the area of land selected by George Washington to become the District of Columbia in 1791; part of the original diamond shape of the city. In 1846 the land comprising today's Alexandria and Arlington (including Hume Springs) was returned to Virginia governance for economic reasons and concerns over the continuance of slavery. This was known as retrocession. Twenty-four years later, in 1870, when the City of Alexandria became independent of the county (now called Arlington County), the Hume Springs land remained with the county.

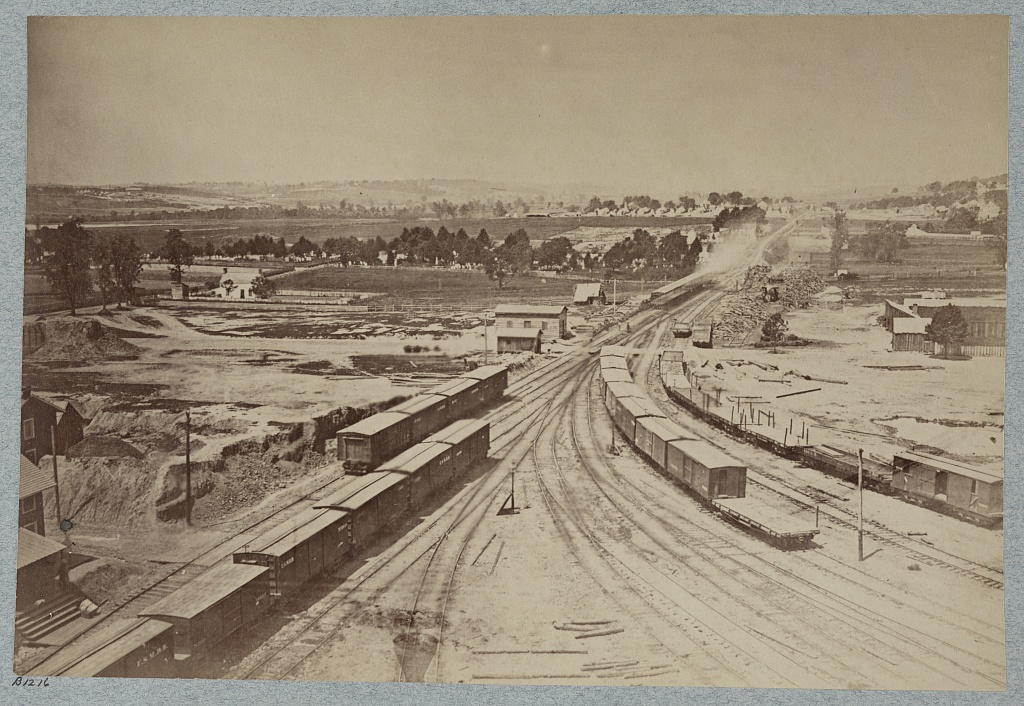
Outskirts of Alexandria, c.1861-1865

In 1908 the Town of Potomac, including the Hume Springs marshland, was incorporated as a town in what is now Arlington County. It was not until 1920 that the County changed its name from Alexandria to Arlington. Then in 1930 the Town of Potomac was annexed by the City of Alexandria, thus finally bringing Hume Springs under the governance of the City of Alexandria as it is today.

== Surrounding wetlands ==
Hume Springs' proximity to the expansive Four Mile Run Park and historic 11-acre tidal freshwater wetland and headlands of the nine-mile stream have lent defining characteristics to the neighborhood. The wetland is part of the watershed for the nearby Potomac River and the Chesapeake Bay. In the 1970s, two acres of it was mostly filled in when the stream channel was dredged in hopes of discontinuing flooding that the surrounding area was prone to. The Hume Springs neighborhood had been built on filled-in sections of tidal marsh.

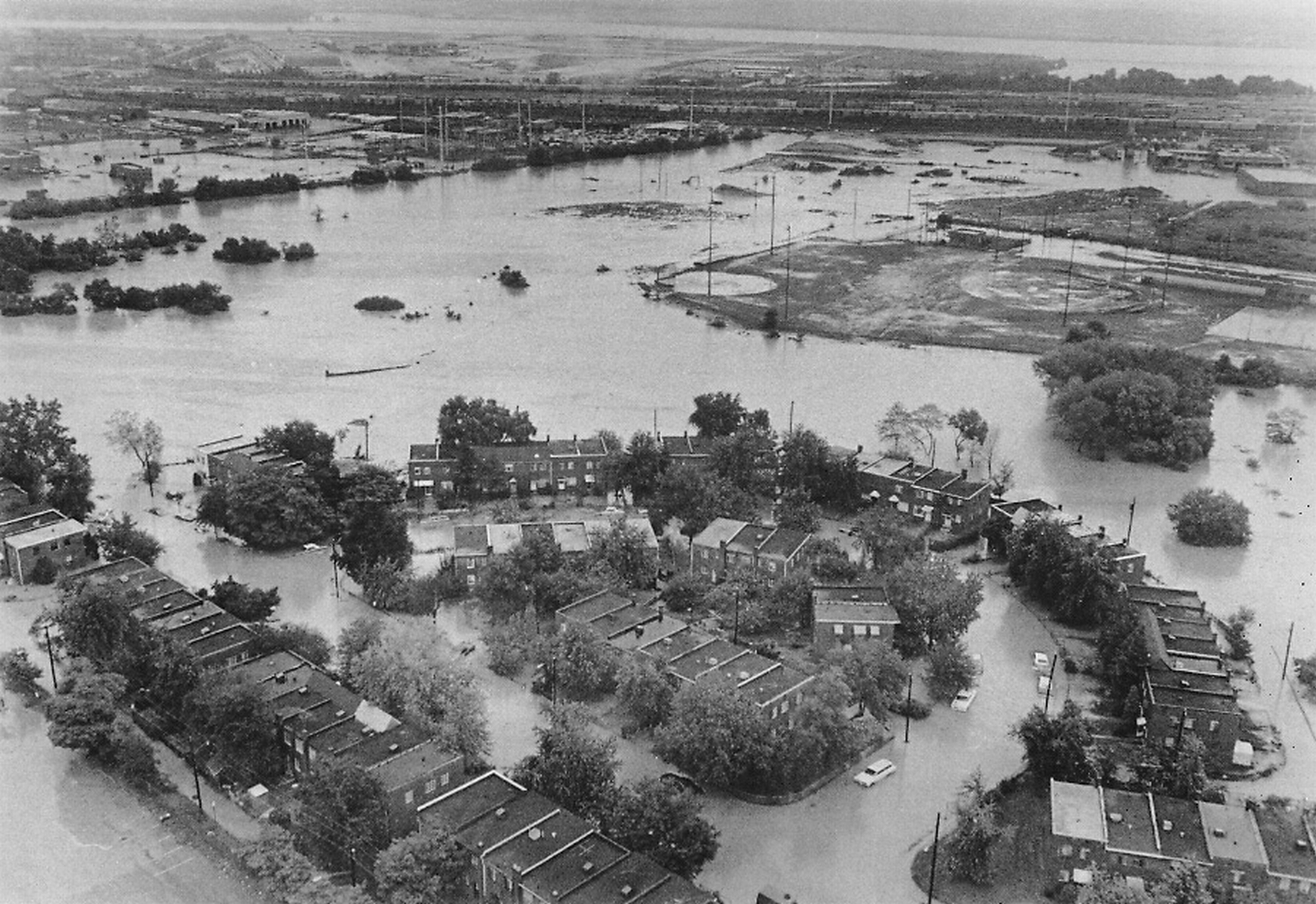
Hume Springs after Hurricane Eloise

Also because of the highly urbanized nature of the Four Mile Run watershed, the neighborhoods and businesses adjacent to the lower portion of the stream were subjected to repeated flooding, beginning in the 1940s. Alexandria and Arlington forged a partnership in the 1970s with the US Army Corps of Engineers (USACE) to build a flood-control channel in the lower portion of Four Mile Run. Construction of that hardened flood control channel - or levee corridor - took place during the 1970s and early 1980s. Today, however, Alexandria and Arlington are jointly working to restore this lower section of the stream's natural banks and vegetation by "greening" it, along with installing new paths, crossovers and other amenities that will serve the population around the future Potomac Yard metro station. This is part of the Joint Four Mile Run Restoration Master Plan, a $261 million plan to transform the stream corridor. Throughout 2015 and 2016, the media and government officials highlighted the completion of the $1.8 million Four Mile Run Tidal Restoration Demonstration Project that restored the historic 2-acre tidal wetland where the water levels fluctuate with the daily tidal cycle along Four Mile Run.

== 1990s to 2010s ==
In the 1990s the Hume Springs neighborhood was known as "the Hole", a place to purchase illegal drugs from what turned out to be a highly efficient drug ring. Starting in 1993, some residents of Hume Springs banded together to pressure crack dealers and discourage visiting buyers. Finally, in the late 1990s, with law enforcement investigations and the ensuing "Operation Dirty Dozen" drug crackdown, there was mostly success in ejecting the negative elements.

In 2015, Hume Springs gathered media attention with the highly publicized refurbishment of the Hume Springs Playground Park, a partnership between RunningBrooke non-profit and the City of Alexandria. Also with its proximity to Four Mile Run Park, the area was highlighted during the December 2015 stabbing death of 22 year old Eduardo Almendarez found in Four Mile Run Park.

The Hume Springs neighborhood has seen changes in the ethnic and racial make-up of residents as increasing numbers of young white professionals seek more affordable housing closer to Old Town Alexandria, downtown DC, Crystal City and The Pentagon. As well, the aging of established residents has influenced turn-over. In 2010, the residents were roughly 50% Latino (mostly from El Salvador), 20% African American and 30% White/other.
