= Rosemont Historic District =

Rosemont Historic District may refer to:

- Rosemont Historic District (Alexandria, Virginia)
- Rosemont Historic District (Martinsburg, West Virginia)

== See also ==
- Rosemont Crest Historic District, a National Register of Historic Places listing in Dallas County, Texas
