= Rosenberg =

Rosenberg, Rosenburg or Rozenburg may refer to:

== Places ==
=== Germany ===
- Rosenberg (Baden), a municipality in the district of Neckar-Odenwald, Baden-Württemberg, Germany
- Rosenberg (Ostalb), a municipality in the district of Ostalbkreis, Baden-Württemberg, Germany
- Sulzbach-Rosenberg in the district of Amberg-Sulzbach, Bavaria, Germany

=== Poland ===
- Susz, in Poland (Rosenberg in Westpreußen, West Prussia)
- Olesno, in Poland (Upper Silesia)

=== United States ===
- Rosenburg, Nebraska, an unincorporated community in the U.S.
- Rosenberg, Texas, Fort Bend County, U.S.

=== Elsewhere ===
- Rosenberg Glacier, a glacier in Antarctica
- Rosenburg-Mold, a town in the district of Horn, Austria
  - Rosenburg, a castle in the town
- Rožmberk nad Vltavou with Rožmberk Castle in the Czech Republic
- Rozenburg (island), Netherlands
  - Rozenburg, a town and submunicipality
- Ružomberok, in Slovakia
- Rosenburg (Winterthur), a quarter in Switzerland

== People ==
- Rosenberg (surname), includes Rozenburg
- Julius and Ethel Rosenberg, a couple convicted of spying for the Soviet Union that was executed by the federal government of the United States in 1953

== See also ==
- Rosenberg Trio, a musical group
- Rosenberg's Department Store, a historic building in Santa Rosa, California
- Rosenberg Brothers Department Store, a historic building in Albany, Georgia, United States
- Rosenberger (disambiguation)
- Rosenborg (disambiguation)
- Rosemont (disambiguation), the French analogue corresponding to rose + hill/mountain
