= Sarah A. Gray =

American educator

Sarah A. Gray (c. 1847 – January 8, 1893) was an American educator from the state of Virginia.

== Biography ==
Sarah A. Gray was born in Alexandria, Virginia to parents William and Laura Dundas Gray. As her father was free and her mother was emancipated, she was able to attend St. Francis School in Baltimore (an opportunity which was not afforded to most African Americans at the time, under slavery). She began teaching at age 14.

As the Civil War progressed, many former slaves fled to Alexandria. To address the educational needs of their children, Gray and colleague Jane A. Crouch founded the St. Rose Institute, which remained open throughout the war. Gray established the Excelsior School in 1867, and became a teacher at Alexandria's first public school for black girls, Hallowell School, in 1870. She was named Hallowell's principal in 1883. During her tenure, she traveled to Northern states to study new educational methods and added high school classes to Hallowell's curriculum.

She retired in 1892 for health reasons, and died in 1893.

== Honors ==
In 1920, Hallowell School for Girls was consolidated with Snowden School for Boys. The combined institution was named Parker-Gray School, in honor of Sarah A. Gray and fellow African American educator John F. Parker. After this closed, a new Parker-Gray High School was established in 1950. This remained open until 1965, when all Alexandria schools were integrated. In 1983, T. C. Williams High School's stadium was renamed Parker-Gray Memorial Stadium. The original school also lent its name to the surrounding neighborhood.

In 2016, Sarah A. Gray was honored by the Library of Virginia's Virginia Women in History program.
