= Rosemount =

Rosemount may refer to:

== Place names ==
=== Australia ===
- Rosemount, Queensland

=== Canada ===
- Rural Municipality of Rosemount No. 378, Saskatchewan

=== Ireland ===
- Rosemount, County Westmeath, an area in the Southwest of Westmeath

=== United Kingdom ===
- Rosemount, Aberdeen, an area of the Scottish city of Aberdeen
- Rosemount, County Down, a townland in County Down, Northern Ireland
- Rosemount, Derry, an area of Derry, Northern Ireland
- Rosemount, Perth and Kinross, a location in Scotland

=== United States ===
- Rosemount (Forkland, Alabama), a plantation in Forkland, Alabama, listed on the NRHP in Alabama
- Rosemount Museum, a historic house museum in Pueblo, Colorado, listed on the NRHP
- Rosemount, Minnesota
- Rosemount, Ohio

== Other uses ==
- Rosemount (wine), an Australian brandname owned by Treasury Wine Estates
- Rosemount Inc., a manufacturer of industrial process measurement devices, and Rosemount Engineering, the original name of the company
- Rosemount International School, Singapore
- Rosemount Primary School, in Rosemount, Ohio
- Rosemount Rec F.C., a football club in Northern Ireland

== See also ==
- Rosemont (disambiguation)
