= Rosemont station =

Rosemont station may refer to:

- Rosemont station (CTA), a Chicago "L" station
- Rosemont station (Metra), a commuter rail station in Rosemont, Illinois
- Rosemont station (Montreal Metro), a Montreal Metro station in the borough of Rosemont–La Petite-Patrie
- Rosemont station (SEPTA), a SEPTA Regional Rail station in Rosemont, Pennsylvania
- Roberts Road station, formerly Rosemont station, a SEPTA rapid transit station in Rosemont, Pennsylvania

== See also ==
- Rosemont (disambiguation)
