= Rosenborg =

Rosenborg may refer to:

== Places ==
=== Denmark ===
- Rosenborg Castle, a castle in Copenhagen, Denmark

=== Norway ===
- Rosenborg, Trondheim, an area in the city of Trondheim, Norway
- Rosenborg (station) of the Oslo Tramway
- Rosenborg (old station) of the Oslo Tramway

== Sports ==
- Rosenborg BK, an association football club based in the city of Trondheim, Norway
- Rosenborg IHK, an ice hockey club based in the city of Trondheim, Norway

== Other ==
- Rosenborg (cheese), a variety of the Castello brand produced by Arla Foods

== See also ==
- Rosenberg (disambiguation)
