= Joseph Rosenberger =

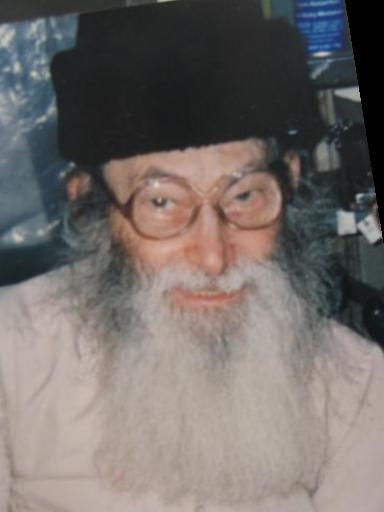
Joseph Rosenberger

Joseph Rosenberger (יוסף בן משה הלוי) (died November 2/3, 1996) was an Austrian Jewish garment worker who, by founding the first shatnes laboratory in America, single-handedly introduced shatnes-checking in the United States. The lab he founded still exists at 203 Lee Avenue in Williamsburg, Brooklyn.

== Biography ==
=== Refugee ===
Rosenberger arrived in the United States in 1940 after having spent 5 months in the Dachau concentration camp. From the time he arrived in America until 1944, he lived in a refugee home sponsored by the Zeirei Agudah at 616 Bedford Avenue in Williamsburg, Brooklyn.

Rosenberger's father had a clothing store in Austria and he was interested in fabrics from a very early age.

Rosenberger was approached by Mordechai Neumann to find out how to best check garments for shatnes, a biblically forbidden mixture of wool and linen according to Jewish law. Rosenberger sought out garment dealers in both Williamsburg and the Lower East Side of Manhattan but found that there was both little knowledge and little interest in this area of Jewish law.

Armed with a passion, Rosenberger enrolled in Manhattan's Textile High School in order to learn all he could about linen. He coupled this with taking menial jobs in the garment industry in order to find the many uses that linen had in clothing manufacturing. He also searched the New York Public Library for information on testing for the presence of linen, but found that all current tests were either too slow or too expensive for him to employ with any hopes of encouraging others to accept his recommendations.

He still had to overcome the hurdle of convincing the Orthodox Jewish community of the importance of checking for shatnes. Rosenberger was often booted out of synagogues and assembly halls with derision by the public who did not believe him to be genuine. Rosenberger introduced a method of sample testing, which enabled one to certify a garment to be free of having shatnes, without thoroughly testing the garment. This included the ability to use unskilled persons across the United States of America who were coined with the term "sample testers", as they were able to take samples and send them to Rosenberger to verify them as being free of shatnez even though they were relatively untrained. With the later introduction of garments being imported from abroad with diverse and unsystematic standards, the "sample testing system" together with these "sample testers" has virtually disappeared.

=== Educating the public ===
Things changed when Rosenberger met Mike Tress, who was in charge of Orthodox Youth Magazine. Tress was impressed with Rosenberger's willingness and offered him free advertising space in the magazine, along with free use of the office phones and copy machine. Rosenberger taught himself to type so as to be able to produce posters and other forms of reading material about the importance of checking for shatnes.

Tress also introduced Rosenberger to Rabbi Herbert S. Goldstein, spiritual leader of the West Side Institutional Synagogue, who had many congregants involved in the garment industry, including Alex Levy, owner of Crawford Clothes. Goldstein convinced Levy to lend Rosenberger $250 for advertising space in The Jewish Morning Journal. The advertisements states that free shatnes checking would be available at Crawford Clothes. Although only five customers came to have their garments checked that first week, Crawford Clothes' competitors feared that customers would see them as not providing the same level of service at Crawford. They sought out Rosenberger and arranged for him to check their customers' merchandise as well, and when people saw that the clothiers could no longer guarantee their clothes were free of shatnes, Rosenberger's dream was realized; people became very interested in making sure that their clothing should not contain shatnes.

Goldstein used his connections to network Rosenberger with the most influential Orthodox Jewish organizations of the time, such as the Agudas Israel and the National Council of Young Israel. Goldstein also penned a letter of endorsement in 1941 under the auspices of the Orthodox Union addressed to hundreds of congregational rabbis stressing the importance of informing their congregants of the need to have their garments checked for shatnes.

Rosenberger died on the 7th day of the Jewish lunar month of Cheshvan.

== Williamsburg shatnes laboratory and beyond ==
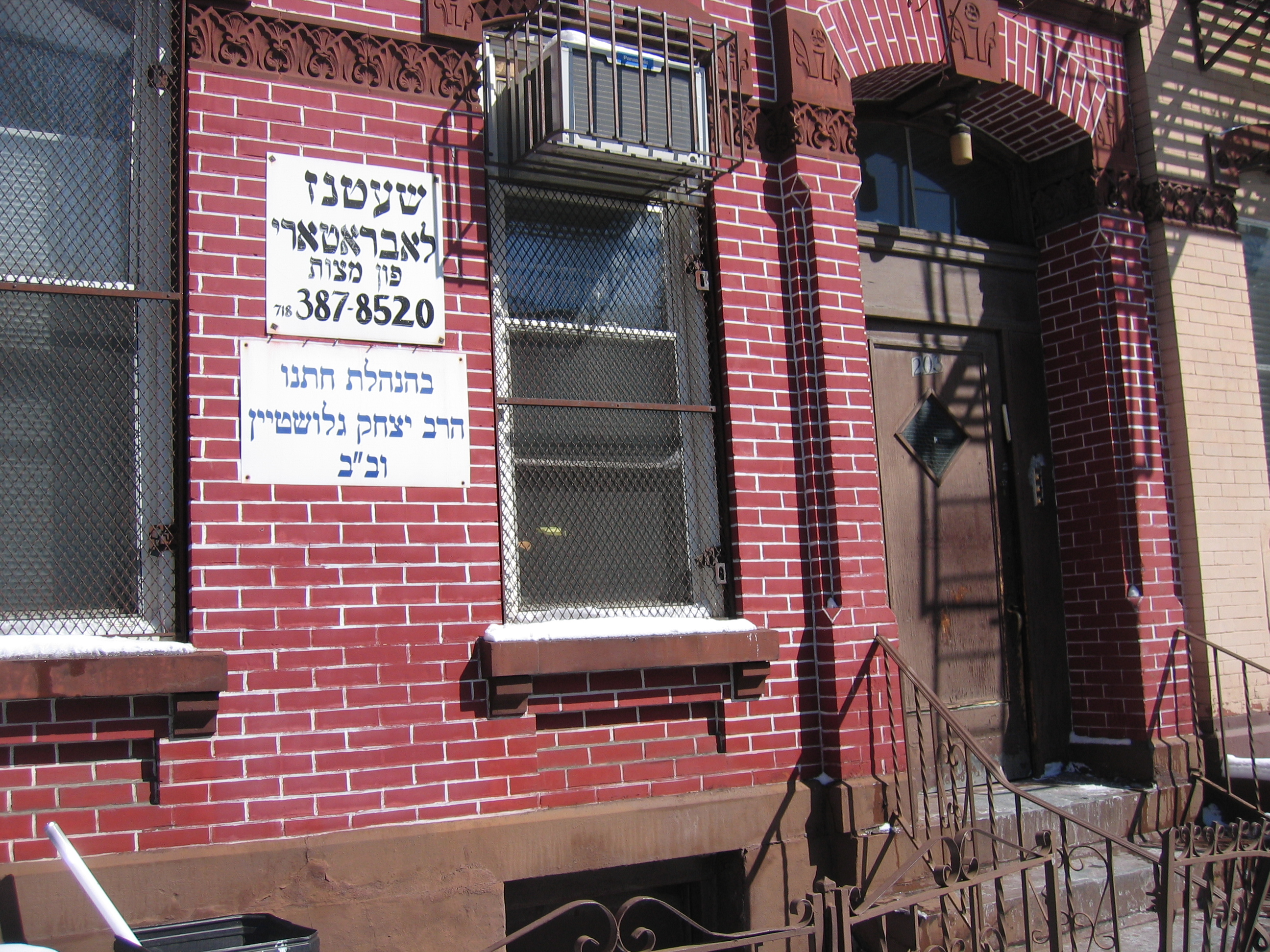
The Williamsburg shatnes lab at 203 Lee Avenue on the corner of Heyward Street. The upper sign states "Shatnes Laboratory of Mitzvot" and the phone number.

In 1941, Rosenberger opened the first shatnes laboratory in North America in the Williamsburg section of Brooklyn.

In his later years, Rosenberger had various assistants at his laboratory among them Yoel Schockett and Aron Drebin, who both later opened laboratories of their own. Schockett currently leads a shatnes laboratory in Lakewood, New Jersey and Drebin currently leads a shatnes laboratory in the Flatbush neighborhood of Brooklyn.
