= Ferdinand Rosenberger =

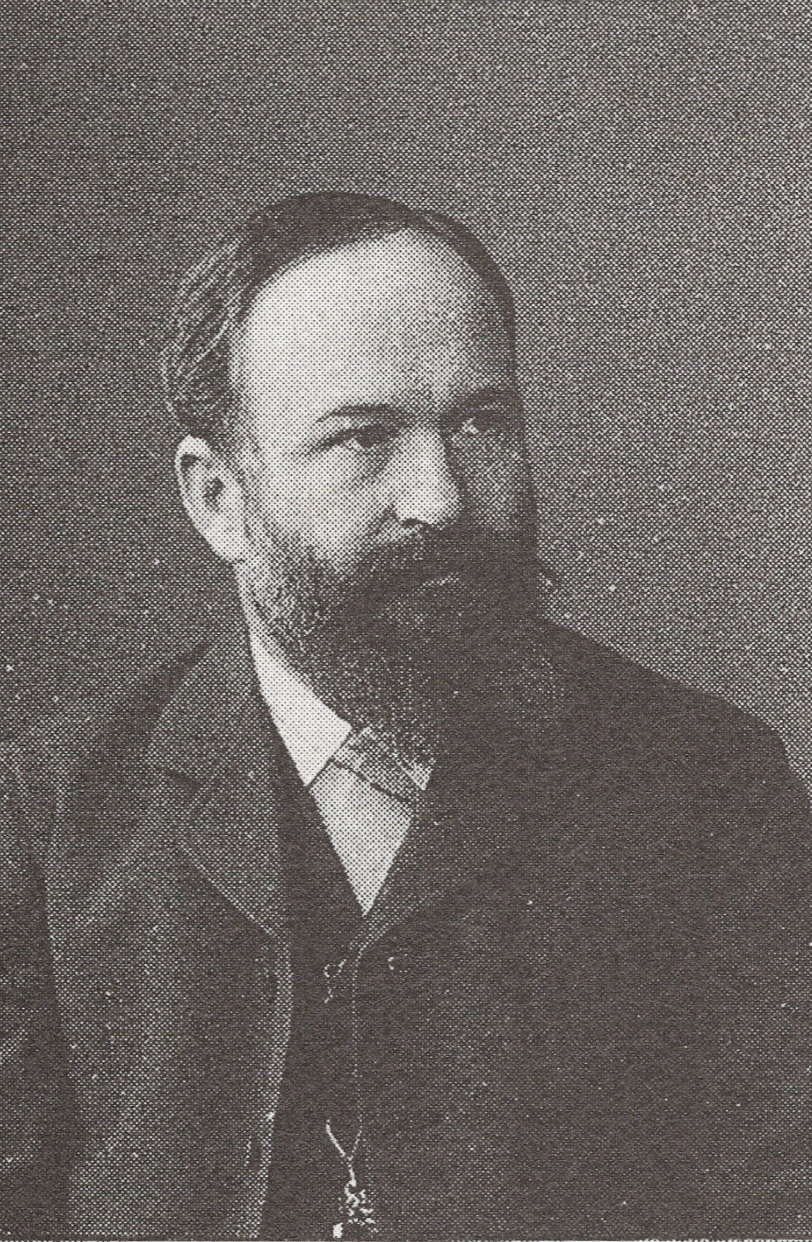

Johann Karl Ferdinand Rosenberger (29 August 1845 – 11 September 1899) was a German science historian who specialized in the history of physics.

Rosenberger was born in Lobeda near Jena and although interested in music, trained as a teacher and taught at an elementary school before taking up higher studies at the University of Jena. After receiving a PhD in 1870 he taught mathematics and natural science at private schools before moving to Frankfurt am Main in 1877 to teach at the Realgymnasium. He was made professor in 1893 and continued to work here until his death. He was elected member of the Leopoldina Academy in 1892. He began to study the history of mathematics in 1876 and later physics. He published only a few works including three volumes on the history of physics and on Isaac Newton's ideas. He was able to identify that Newton's inverse square law on forces was automatically linked itself to the curves of the conic section form although Newton himself did not attempt to demonstrate it. Rosenberger noted that the progression of the sciences took place from speculative philosophy to the use of experimental techniques and then into mathematical formulations. He believed that Newtonian approaches with mathematics and experimental approaches had reduced the role of philosophy and that the role of philosophy needed to be understood by scientists.
