= Potomac, Virginia =

- Town of Potomac
- U.S. National Register of Historic Places
- U.S. Historic district
- Virginia Landmarks Register
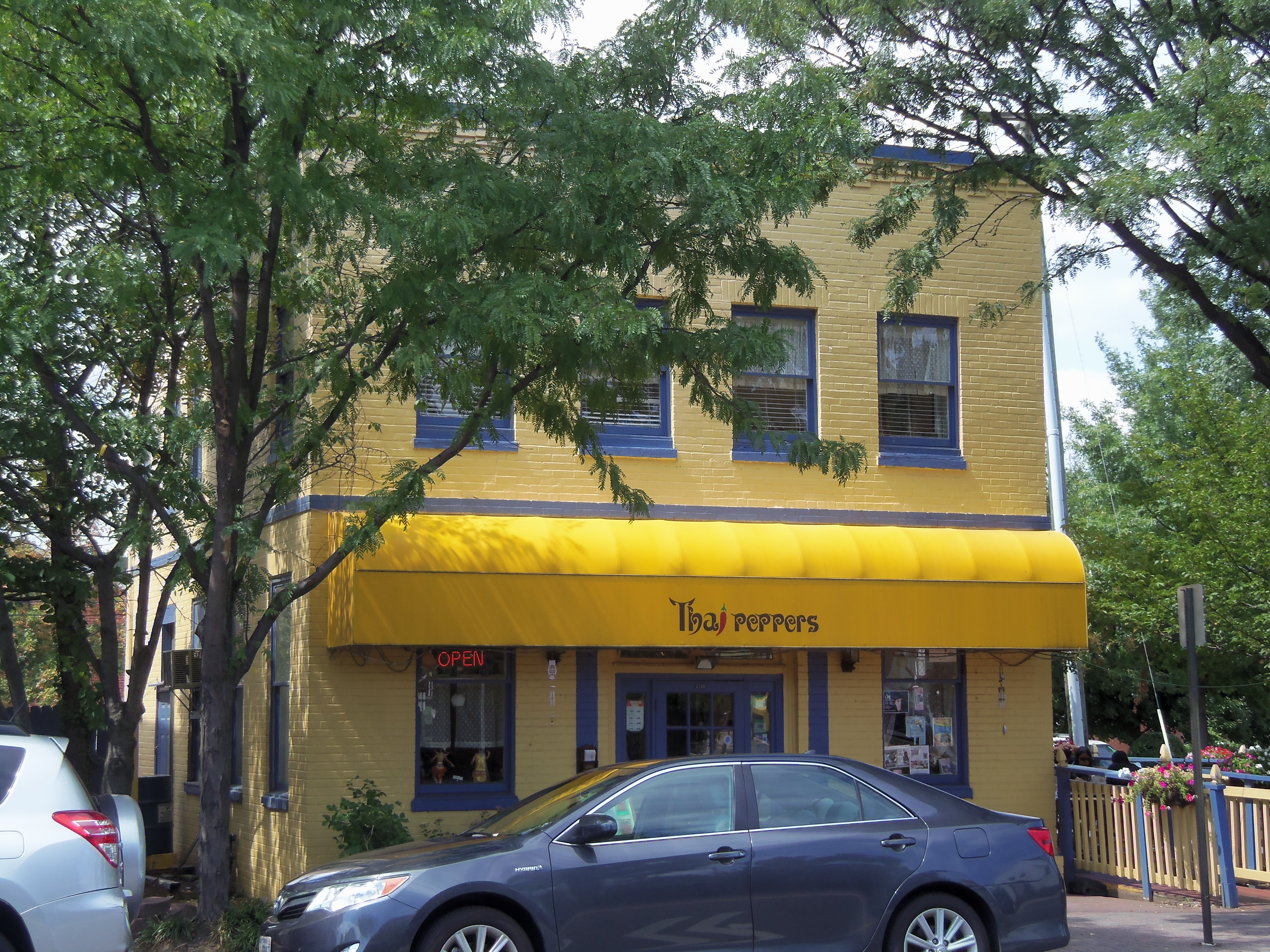
- Commercial building on Mt. Vernon Ave.

- Location within Alexandria Location within Northern Virginia Location within Virginia Location within the United States
- Location: Roughly bounded by Commonwealth Ave., US 1, E. Bellefonte Ave. and Ashby St., Alexandria, Virginia
- Coordinates: 38°49′37″N 77°3′24″W
- Area: 184 acres (74 ha)
- Built: 1894
- Architect: Multiple
- Architectural style: Colonial Revival, Bungalow/Craftsman, Queen Anne
- NRHP reference No.: 92001186
- VLR No.: 100-0136

Significant dates
- Added to NRHP: September 10, 1992
- Designated VLR: December 11, 1991

Potomac (/pəˈtoʊmək/) was an incorporated town formerly located in Arlington County, Virginia (then called Alexandria County). Today the dissolved town's former territory is located within the City of Alexandria after municipal annexation in 1930. As a planned community, its proximity to Washington D.C. made it a popular place for employees of the U.S. government to live. Potomac was located adjacent to the massive Potomac Yard of the Richmond, Fredericksburg and Potomac Railroad.

== History ==
The area was developed beginning in 1894 as the communities of Del Ray, St. Elmo, Mt. Ida, and Hume, following a grid plan independent of that of Old Town Alexandria. Potomac was incorporated as a town in 1908. In 1928, the town had 2,355 residents.

The Town of Potomac was annexed by the independent city of Alexandria in 1930. Today, the Town of Potomac Historic District in Alexandria designates this historic portion of the city, and includes 1,840 acres (7.4 km^{2}) and 690 buildings.. The Town of Potomac was added to the National Register of Historic Places in 1992.

As of 2016, the United States Postal Service still recognizes "Potomac, VA" as an acceptable alternate address for ZIP code 22301, although "Alexandria, VA" is preferred.

== See also ==
- Former counties, cities, and towns of Virginia
