= Rosemont Historic District (Martinsburg, West Virginia) =

Historic district in West Virginia, United States

- U.S. National Register of Historic Places
- U.S. Historic district
- Location within West Virginia Location within the United States
- Location: Tennessee, Illinois, Georgia, Kentucky Aves., Martinsburg, West Virginia
- Coordinates: 39°27′27″N 77°58′39″W
- Built: 1910
- Architect: Compton, M.L.; et al.
- Architectural style: Queen Anne, Colonial Revival
- NRHP reference No.: 02001524
- Added to NRHP: December 12, 2002

Rosemont Historic District in Martinsburg, West Virginia, is a historic district that was listed on the National Register of Historic Places in 2002.
