= Uptown–Parker–Gray Historic District =

Historic district in Virginia, United States

- Uptown-Parker–Gray Historic District
- U.S. National Register of Historic Places
- U.S. Historic district
- Virginia Landmarks Register
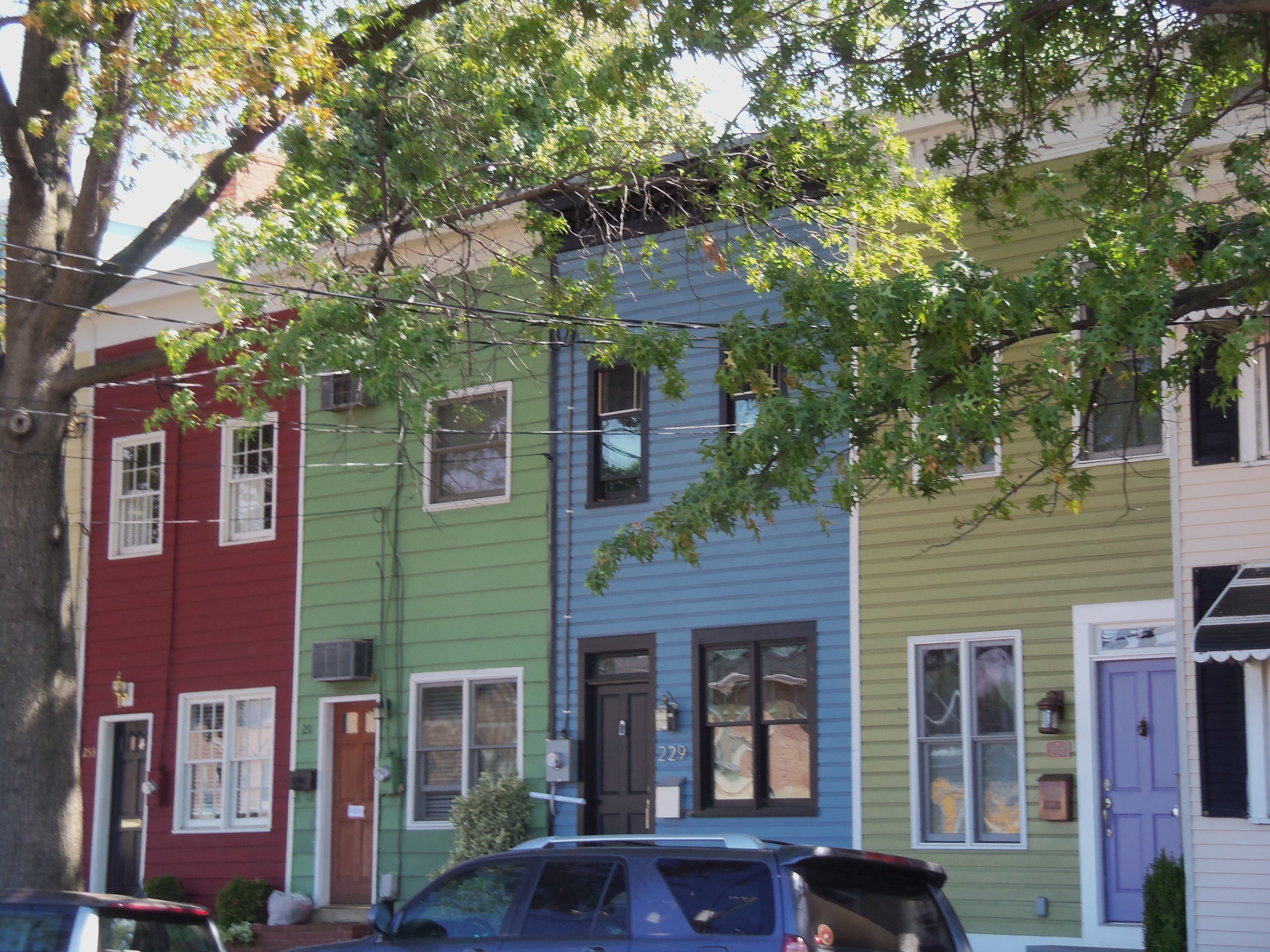

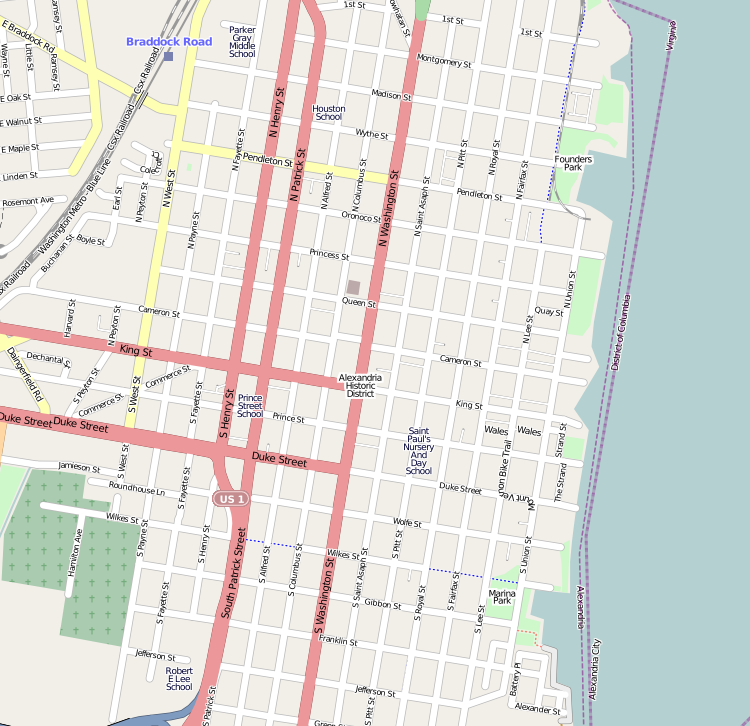
- Location within Alexandria Historical District Location within Northern Virginia Location within Virginia Location within the United States
- Location: Roughly Cameron St. north to 1st St. and N. Columbus St.; west to the following streets forming west line: Buchanan St. and N. West St., Alexandria, Virginia
- Coordinates: 38°48′41″N 77°03′02″W
- Area: 201.6 acres (81.6 ha)
- Architect: Banks & Lee Inc.; et al.
- Architectural style: Greek Revival, Queen Anne, Colonial Revival
- NRHP reference No.: 09001232
- VLR No.: 100-0133

Significant dates
- Added to NRHP: January 12, 2010
- Designated VLR: June 19, 2008

Uptown–Parker–Gray Historic District is a national historic district located at Alexandria, Virginia. The district encompasses 984 contributing buildings in the northwestern quadrant of the Old Town Alexandria street grid as it was laid out in 1797. It mostly consists of small row houses and town houses, but there are also many commercial buildings. The buildings are representative of a number of popular 19th-century architectural styles including Greek Revival and Queen Anne. Also included are more than 200 units of public housing, built between the early 1940s and 1959 as Colonial Revival-style row houses.

It was added to the National Register of Historic Places in 2010.
