= Rosemont Historic District (Alexandria, Virginia) =

Historic district in Virginia, United States

- U.S. National Register of Historic Places
- U.S. Historic district
- Virginia Landmarks Register
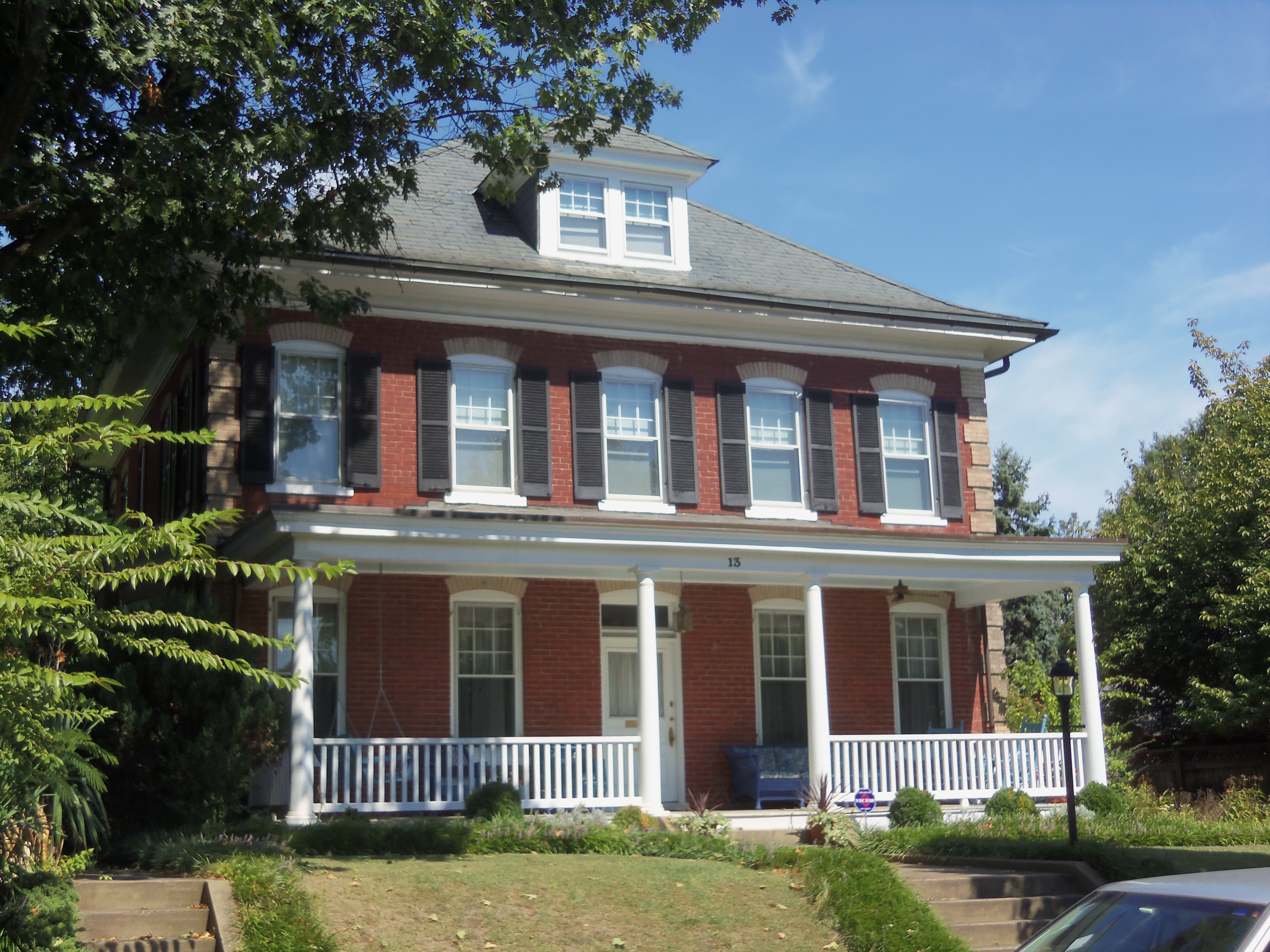

- Location within Alexandria
- Location: Roughly bounded by Commonwealth Ave., W. Walnut St., Russell Rd., Rucker Pl. and King St., Alexandria, Virginia
- Coordinates: 38°48′38″N 77°3′50″W
- Area: 84 acres (34 ha)
- Built: 1908–1941
- Architect: Multiple
- Architectural style: Colonial Revival, Bungalow/Craftsman
- NRHP reference No.: 92001275
- VLR No.: 100-0137

Significant dates
- Added to NRHP: September 24, 1992
- Designated VLR: December 11, 1991

The Rosemont Historic District is a historic district located in Alexandria, Virginia. It was added to the National Register of Historic Places in 1992.

Rosemont is a lushly planted residential area occupying some 84 acres in northwest Alexandria, located adjacent to Alexandria Union Station (ALX). It was developed between 1908 and 1914 by a group of Washington, Alexandria, and Philadelphia investors. The houses were built near the trolley line, allowing residents to work in Washington and live in a suburban neighborhood. Rosemont's more than 450 residences are a prime example of the era's middle-class architecture. House styles range from the American Craftsman, American Foursquare and Arts and Crafts movement to the sedate composition of Colonial Revival homes. The intact original street plan reflects suburban planning ideals of the early 1900s City Beautiful movement.

There are 456 contributing buildings, including 336 houses and apartment buildings, one school, one commercial building, and 118 private garages. One contributing structure and one contributing object were previously listed in the National Register as part of the Boundary Markers of the Original District of Columbia Multiple Property Submission: Southwest # 2 Boundary Marker. The historic district is bounded on the southeast by the Richmond, Fredericksburg and Potomac Railroad line.

During the 1940s, the Rosemont neighborhood used restrictive covenants to exclude Asian-Americans, African-Americans, and any person of the "Hebrew or Jewish Race."
