= Gerry Bertier =

American high school football player and Paralympian (1953–1981)

No. 42 – T. C. Williams Titans
- Position: Linebacker

Personal information
- Born: August 20, 1953; Alexandria, Virginia, U.S.
- Died: March 20, 1981 (aged 27); Charlottesville, Virginia, U.S.

Career information
- High school: Hammond (Alexandria, Virginia); T. C. Williams (Alexandria, Virginia)

Awards and highlights
- Virginia state champion (1971); National Prep School Player of the Year (1971); T. C. Williams Defensive Player of the Year (1971); First-team All-American (1971); First-team All-State (1971); First-team All-Region (1971); T. C. Williams Athletic Hall of Fame; T. C. Williams No. 42 retired

Gerry Bertier (/ˈɡɛri/ GHERR-ee; August 20, 1953 – March 20, 1981) was a high school American football player and Paralympian. He became known for his participation on the 1971 Virginia State Champion football T. C. Williams High School team, and their portrayal in the Disney film Remember the Titans. Bertier was also the nephew of Howie Livingston. After the conclusion of the 1971 season, Bertier was involved in an automobile crash that left him paralyzed from the chest down. Despite this injury, Bertier attended Northern Virginia Community College and remained an active athlete, participating in the Paralympics. In 2006, Bertier's family started the "Bertier #42 Foundation", dedicated to raising money for research on spinal cord injuries. There is also a gymnasium at Alexandria City High School (formerly T.C. Williams High School) that bears his name.

== Early life ==
Bertier's parents divorced when he was around age eight and he was raised primarily by his mother until she remarried Robert Agnew. As a child and young man, Bertier was described as an amiable, goal-oriented individual. Growing up, he frequently discussed his lifetime goal of winning a gold medal in the Olympics, and, as an active participant in various athletics, seemed to be on track for this goal.

== Playing career ==
=== Hammond High School ===
==== 1968–1970 seasons ====
Bertier began his high school career at Hammond High School and joined the football team. He became a key player, soon becoming the backbone of the defense. As a sophomore, Bertier was starting linebacker, a position for which he won many honors. However, Bertier was only able to play three seasons, when Hammond H.S. was merged with two other Alexandria high schools to form T.C. Williams High School.

=== T. C. Williams High School ===
==== 1971 season ====
The consolidation meant there were many new faces on the football team and the coaching staff, which caused racial tension between team members. This new mixture of Titans was forced to come together as a single successful team, dealing with the issue of racial prejudice, a difficult battle for many members of the team. As a captain, Bertier, along with friend and teammate defensive end Julius Campbell, supported their teammates through this struggle. Even though the team struggled with prejudice as the season opener rolled around, the strife was not evident in how the T.C. Titans began the 1971 season. The Titans went 13–0, including nine shutouts, and went on to win the Virginia State Championship. During the Titans' undefeated season, they also outscored their opponents by a 357-45 margin. Bertier's stats during the season included 142 tackles and 42 sacks. Bertier was named team Defensive Most Valuable Player. He was named National Prep School Football Player of the Year and received First Team All-Region, All-State, and All-American honors. As he prepared to move to the next level, Bertier received many football scholarship offers from prominent colleges like Notre Dame and University of Alabama.

== Post-playing career ==
=== First car crash ===
On December 11, 1971, Bertier had been at a banquet honoring the players of the 1971 T.C. Williams Titans football team for their undefeated season. After the banquet, Bertier borrowed his mother's Chevrolet Camaro. Bertier lost control of the Camaro and crashed. He was moved to the operating room when he was stabilized. Although doctors tried to relieve pressure on his spine to help him regain some feeling, it was unsuccessful.

=== Community work ===
Bertier coordinated with junior colleges in Alexandria to set up a "Walk for Mankind," and he encouraged students, adults, and company executives to donate. Bertier occasionally met with others who survived similar injuries, helping them with their rehabilitation. Outside of his hometown, Bertier made speeches across the country for the rights of the disabled. He addressed subjects such as making buildings accessible to disabled people. Bertier worked for Abbey Medical selling medical equipment to disabled people, a position that allowed him to attend wheelchair sporting events held nationally.

=== Paralympics ===
After Bertier recuperated from his injuries, he once again became a competitive athlete. According to his sister, Becky Britt, "During Gerry's childhood he had mentioned being in the Olympics. His long-term goal was to receive a gold medal." He decided to occupy himself in Wheelchair Track and Field, the Wheelchair Basketball League, and the United States Paralympics, setting state and national records.

=== Second car crash and death ===
On March 20, 1981, Bertier was critically injured in a car crash while returning home from a business trip. Driving alone, his southbound 1980 Oldsmobile collided with a northbound car that crossed over the center line on Route 20 in Charlottesville, Virginia. Bertier died afterwards from his injuries in the University of Virginia hospital. A man from Schuyler, Virginia, was charged with manslaughter and driving under the influence of alcohol in connection with the accident.

== Honors and memorials ==
=== Remember the Titans ===
In 2000, Bertier was portrayed in the Disney film Remember the Titans by actor Ryan Hurst. While some elements of the film have a historical basis, certain aspects of Bertier's portrayal are not completely factual. The crash that left him paralyzed happened after the State Championship game, on the night of a banquet celebrating the team's success, rather than a few days before the final game. The name of Bertier's girlfriend, and Bertier and Campbell's relationship, were misrepresented. Bertier's on-the-field portrayal in the film, however, is almost entirely correct. As the team's defensive captain, Bertier was a dominating force on the linebacking corps and received All-American honors following the team's championship season. Although heralded as an exceptional leader on and off the football field, Bertier's duties never included cutting a fellow player from the team as he was shown doing in the film, as there was no player such as Ray on the real life team.

=== Bertier #42 Foundation ===
After becoming paralyzed, Bertier became very active in assisting other survivors of spinal cord injuries. Bertier frequented the spinal cord injury wards of local hospitals to help them with their acceptance of the injury and eventually their rehabilitation. After Bertier died in 1981, his sister, Becky Britt, decided to continue his legacy. In 2006, she created the "Bertier #42 Foundation", to build upon Bertier's tradition of helping survivors of spinal cord injuries. The foundation is dedicated to raising money for the research of spinal cord injuries and works with Virginia Commonwealth University to host annual fundraising golf tournaments. These tournaments draw the support of many Virginia residents, including several members of the 1971 T.C. Williams championship team. The second annual tournament was held September 29, 2007, at the Cannon Ridge Golf Club of Fredericksburg, Virginia. Proceeds were donated to the Spinal Cord Injury Rehabilitation and Research Center of the Virginia Commonwealth University Health System (VCUHS). The 2007 tournament raised approximately $20,000 for donations to the VCUHS.

== See also ==
- Herman Boone
- Ronnie Bass
