= Francis Hammond =

Francis Hammond may refer to:

- Francis C. Hammond (1931–1953), U.S. Navy sailor during the Korean War and Medal of Honor recipient
  - USS Francis Hammond (FF-1067), frigate named after Francis C. Hammond
- Francis Hammond, Governor of Landguard Fort (1711–1719)

== See also ==
- Frank Hammond (1921–2005), author on Christian subjects
