= Gregory Allen Howard =

American screenwriter (1952–2023)

- Born: January 28, 1952; Norfolk, Virginia, U.S.
- Died: January 27, 2023 (aged 70); Miami, Florida, U.S.
- Education: Princeton University
- Occupation: Screenwriter
- Notable work: Remember the Titans, Harriet, Ali
- Mother: Narcissus Cole Howard Henley
- Relatives: Lenard Henley (step-father), Debbie Howard and Lynette Henley(sisters), Ricardo Henley and Michael Henley (brothers)

Gregory Allen Howard (January 28, 1952 – January 27, 2023) was an American journalist, playwright and Hollywood screenwriter. He is best known for composing the screenplay to Disney's award-winning movie Remember the Titans, a film chronicling the real life story of the racial barrier-breaking T.C. Williams High School football team recognized as the sports force to incite community integration in its notoriously Deep South-segregated Alexandria, Virginia, of 1971. Howard is the first African American screenwriter in Hollywood history to script a $100 million-grossing motion picture drama, and the only African American screenwriter in film history to write a spec script that garnered $100 million in revenue.

== Early life ==
Gregory Allen Howard was born on January 28, 1952, in Norfolk, Virginia. As the second of two children born to Narcissus Cole Howard, a full time mother-turned school teacher, and Lowry Marion Howard, Gregory and sister Debbie would see their mother's marriage to their "card shark" father end in divorce early on their childhood. When Gregory was five-years-old, mother Narcissus was remarried to Lenard Henley, a US Navy sailor who would become step-father to Gregory and older sister Debbie and would go on to father Gregory's younger sister Lynette Henley and brothers Ricardo Henley and Michael Henley. Due to his stepfather's military naval duty, Gregory and his family engaged annum-frequencies of out-of-state moves to Navy bases set in several different US cities. Over the course of a decade of Gregory's coming of age years, between the ages of five and 15, the Howard-Henley family moved a total of ten times. The period of relocations, which included stops in Norfolk, Virginia, Philadelphia, Pennsylvania, San Diego, California, Charleston, South Carolina, is an era that Gregory Howard described in his own words as "a vagabond existence that you live as a Navy family." Eventually, the family settled in "The Navy City" of Vallejo, California. Howard attended Vallejo High School, where he served as Vallejo High School class president. At Vallejo High, Howard was also an offensive lineman on the Vallejo Red Hawks football team. After attending college at Princeton University, graduating with a degree in American history, Howard briefly worked at Merrill Lynch on Wall Street before moving to Los Angeles in his mid-twenties to pursue a writing career.

== Career ==
Over the next few years Howard worked as a freelance writer and on a number of television shows, including being a story editor for Where I Live and working on the 1990 short-lived FOX series True Colors. Howard also wrote a stage play, Tinseltown Trilogy, which garnered him awards. Tinseltown Trilogy weaves together three interconnected one-act plays that focus on three men in Los Angeles on Christmas Eve.

Howard was then selected for the assignment to write an original screenplay for the biographical film of boxer Muhammad Ali. Having finished the first draft and then moving back to his native Virginia, Howard discovered the story of the 1971 TC Williams Titans. Studio delays and rewrites meant that his first feature film, Ali, was not released until after his next script, Remember the Titans.

Remember the Titans was a spec script written by Gregory Allen Howard after he discovered the unique story of the integrated high school football team that the town of Alexandria, Virginia, credited for the town's positive race relations. He based the script on extensive research, including discussions with Coaches Herman Boone and Bill Yoast. Initially Howard encountered difficulty in getting his script produced. Eventually Jerry Bruckheimer agreed to produce the film. Starring Denzel Washington and Will Patton, Remember the Titans became a box-office hit, grossing over $100 million domestically.

After the release of Remember the Titans and Ali, Howard worked on a number of other projects. He was an uncredited writer for Glory Road, a sports drama released in 2006 that focused on Texas Western coach Don Haskins leading the first all-black starting line-up for a college basketball team to the NCAA national championship in 1966.

In 2004, Howard worked on the script for a film project with Morgan Freeman based on the 761st Tank Battalion, the first black armored unit to see combat in World War II. Howard also wrote a screenplay called Factor X, which Ridley Scott was attached to produce, and possibly direct, in 2006.

In 2014, Howard completed the screenplay of a movie about the Soviet Airwomen of the Great Patriotic War called Night Witches and financed by the grandson of Boris Yeltsin. He co-wrote and co-produced the 2019 Harriet Tubman biographical film Harriet, for which he also received a "story by" credit.

On November 12, 2019, Howard's Black Panther Party script Power to the People was acquired by Paramount Pictures with George Tillman Jr. in talks to direct and Ben Affleck producing.

In 2020, Gregory Allen Howard was nominated for an NAACP Image Award for Outstanding Writing in a Motion Picture over his screenplay for the Hollywood biopic film Harriet, based on the life and legacy of Harriet “The Black Moses” Tubman, famed conductor of The Underground Railroad. In the weeks leading to the November 1st, 2019 US movie release of Harriet, Mr. Howard engaged several press interviews with mentions of racial inequality in Hollywood. In a well documented 2019 interview with journalist Alissa Wilkinson, during which time he noted Harriet Tubman as “the underdog of underdogs," Howard, a staunch historian, revealed Harriet the film was 25-years in-the-making. With reference made to the Oscars So White movement, Howard alluded to the change that he said had to happen before Hollywood was ready for film production of his Harriet screenplay. “Listen, I wrote this. It’s my Valentine to black girls,”Howard noted. “If it inspires some black girls that they can do something amazing, then I’ve done my job.”

== Death ==
Howard died from heart failure in Miami on January 27, 2023, one day shy of his 71st birthday.

== Awards and nominations ==
Year	Award	Result	Category	Film or series
2001	Black Reel Awards	Won	Theatrical - Best Screenplay (Original or Adapted)	Remember the Titans
2002	Black Reel Awards	Nominated	Theatrical - Best Screenplay (Original or Adapted)	Ali
2020	NAACP Image Awards	Nominated	NAACP Image Award for Outstanding Writing in a Motion Picture (Film)	Harriet
