= Jude Kenan Mohammad =

American jihadist (1988-2011)

- Born: November 4, 1988; Florida
- Died: November 16, 2011 (aged 23); Babar Ghar, South Waziristan, Pakistan
- Citizenship: United States
- Allegiance: Al-Qaeda

Jude Kenan Mohammad (November 4, 1988 – November 16, 2011) was an American suspected terrorist charged by the U.S. government in 2009 for being a member of the Raleigh jihad group. Prior to the indictment, he had left the United States for Pakistan, and was thus the only indicted member of the cell who was not arrested. He was killed in Waziristan, Pakistan in 2011, the fourth American citizen killed by a drone strike overseas since 2009.

== Early life ==
Mohammad was born on November 4, 1988 in Florida. Mohammad's father is from Darra Adam Khel, near Peshawar, Pakistan. His mother is American who converted from Catholicism to Islam. The couple had five children and lived in Pakistan. In the late 1990s, Mohammad moved with mother and siblings to Raleigh, North Carolina.

== Travel to Pakistan ==
In early 2008, friends reported that Kenan had become a more observant Muslim. He stopped drinking and partying, and traveled to be with his father in Darra Adam Khel in October 2008. He left Raleigh around October 7, weeks before his 20th birthday, at the urging of Daniel Patrick Boyd.

The Guardian reported that on October 13, 2008, Mohammed left Darra Adam Khel, ostensibly for Peshawar. Instead, he took a taxi headed to the North-West Frontier Province in Pakistan. He was 19 years old and claimed to Pakistani government officials to be a tourist. He was arrested on the border of Mohmand District, dominated by the Taliban, and Charsadda. He was interrogated by the Pakistani Inter-Services Intelligence and charged with two misdemeanors: missing paperwork and illegally carrying a weapon. He was freed on a £750 bail. He was in Pakistani jail for 7 days. After release, he skipped out on his bail and fled.

== U.S. criminal charges ==
Around the same time, the FBI was investigating Daniel Patrick Boyd, who had traveled to Pakistan in the 1980s to participate in the Soviet–Afghan War, for possible terrorist activity.

On August 4, 2009, the FBI indicted Mohammad as the eighth member of the Raleigh jihad group, led by Daniel Patrick Boyd, that allegedly plotted to commit murder and conduct kidnappings overseas and against the U.S. Marines base in Quantico, Virginia. Mohammad was the only member of the cell not yet in custody, and the FBI alleged that Mohammad had traveled to Pakistan to engage in "violent jihad".

According to Seth Jones of the RAND Corporation, U.S. officials believed that Mohammad had also helped to persuade 5 people from Virginia to travel to Pakistan.

The FBI added Mohammad to its Most Wanted list.

== Death ==
He was killed in a CIA drone strike in the tribal areas of Babar Ghar, South Waziristan, Pakistan, on November 16, 2011. Mohammad was the fourth American citizen killed by a drone strike overseas since 2009, following AQAP affiliate Anwar al-Awlaki, Awlaki's son Abdulrahman, and Samir Khan.

The Obama Administration publicly announced Mohammad's death in May 2013, but did not release details such as the exact date or location. Attorney General Eric Holder revealed that Mohammad was not specifically targeted, suggesting Mohammad was killed in a signature strike.
