= Ferdinand T. Day =

American civil-rights activist and educator

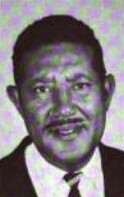
Ferdinand T. Day, circa 1972

Ferdinand T. "Fred" Day (August 7, 1918 – January 2, 2015) was an American civil rights leader and educator.

== Early life and education ==
Day was born in 1918 in Alexandria, Virginia and attended Parker-Gray School through eighth grade. He attended Armstrong Technical High School (now known as Friendship Armstrong Academy) in Washington, D.C., graduating in 1935. At the time, Alexandria offered no formal high school education for Black Americans. Day received a Bachelor of Science degree in geography and history from Miner Teachers College.

== Career ==
While Day wanted to be an educator in his hometown, he was unable to teach in Alexandria because he was Black. Instead, he began working for the federal government in 1948 and served in the foreign service at the U.S. Department of State, retiring in 1978.

Day remained involved in Alexandria, volunteering for the local chapters of the Urban League and NAACP. He provided advice to the picket protests of the Virginia ABC stores and the Diamond Cab Company because they would not employ Black Americans, and supported protests of the Alexandria City Hall because they continued to fly the Confederate flag.

=== Public office ===
In 1964, Day was appointed to the Alexandria City School Board, just ten years after the U.S. Supreme Court's Brown v. Board of Education decision, becoming the first African American school board member in Virginia. In 1971 he was elected as the chair of the board, becoming the first African American to be elected chair of a public board of education in Virginia history.

Day was highly active in working towards the desegregation of Alexandria. He led the Board when it made the controversial decision to consolidate all high school students at the then-new T.C. Williams High School, which loosely inspired the film Remember the Titans.

He was later appointed by the Governor of Virginia as a member of the Board of the Virginia Community College System. In 1985, he was selected by the Virginia Secretary of Education to assist in the continued implementation of desegregation in Virginia.

== Death and legacy ==
Day died in 2015. After his death, Congressman and former Lieutenant Governor of Virginia Don Beyer wrote, “America lost a giant this week. Mr. Day was an early and powerful leader in the successful efforts to integrate the leadership of Alexandria. As the first African American appointed to the Alexandria School Board – and later as its chairman – Mr. Day was essential to the expansion of equal educational opportunity for all our children.”

=== Legacy ===
A street in Alexandria, Ferdinand Day Drive, was named in his honor. The Alexandria City High School's Ferdinand T. Day Student Commons are also named after him.

Day was portrayed by actor Lou Walker in the 2000 film, Remember the Titans.

Ferdinand T. Day Elementary School in Alexandria is named for Day.
