= Khalilah =

Khalilah is a given name. Notable people with the name include:

- Khalilah Ali (born 1950), actress and martial artist
- Khalilah Sabra (born 1967), American Muslim advocate and author
- Aisha Khalilah Steiner or A. L. Steiner (born 1967), American multimedia artist, author and educator
