= Alexandria City Public Schools =

School district in Virginia, USA

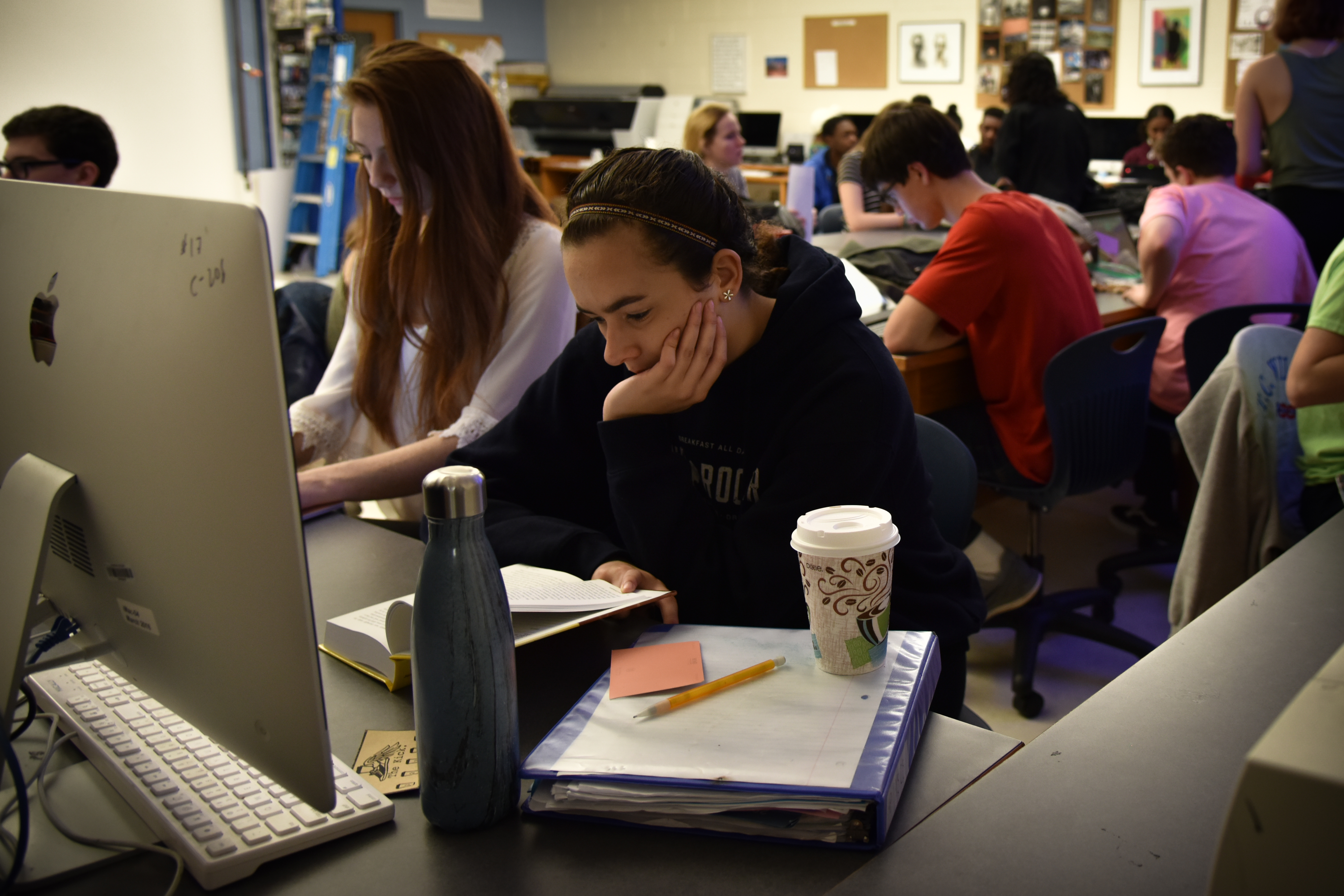

Address
- 1340 Braddock Place Alexandria, Virginia, 22314; United States

District information
- Type: School division
- Established: November 23, 1785; 240 years ago
- Superintendent: Dr. Jharrett Bryantt
- Schools: 18
- Budget: $283.9 million (FY2018)
- NCES District ID: 5100120

Students and staff
- Enrollment: 15,928 (2025)
- Teachers: 1,415
- Staff: 937
- Student–teacher ratio: 13.8:1
- Athletic conference: Gunston District; Region 6C

Other information
- Website: www.acps.k12.va.us

Alexandria City Public Schools (ACPS) is a school division which is funded by the government of Alexandria, Virginia, United States.

== Administration ==
The current superintendent, appointed by the school board, is Dr. Melanie Kay-Wyatt, who began in that position on July 1, 2023. She was previously the chief of human resources in ACPS after joining the school system in 2021 and then served as the interim superintendent.

=== School Board ===
There are nine members of the Alexandria City Public School Board. All members of the board are elected by district every three years, and the chair is appointed by the board. There are also two student representatives.

==== Members ====
District A

- Tim Beaty
- Ryan Reyna
- Michelle Rief

District B

- Kelly Carmichael Booz
- Alexander Crider Sciosia, Vice chair
- Ashley Simpson Baird

District C

- Abdulahi Abdalla
- Christopher Harris, Chair
- Donna Kenley

== History ==
The first school offering public education in Alexandria was founded in 1785, the Washington Free School, partly funded by George Washington.

Although the desegregation process began in 1959 when nine black school children entered all-white Theodore Ficklin Elementary School after an NAACP lawsuit, it was not until 1974 that Superintendent John Albohm announced "This year, we have finally reorganized our elementary schools and, in a broad sense, have completed the desegregation of our school system kindergarten through grade 12".

In November 2020, the school board unanimously voted to rename T. C. Williams High School and Matthew Maury Elementary School, with name selection coming before the 2021–22 school year. This follows years of community efforts to rename T. C. Williams because its namesake, a former superintendent of Alexandria City Public Schools, was a supporter of racial segregation in schools.

In March 2021, the superintendent put forward two final names after community input: "Alexandria High School" and "Naomi Brooks Elementary School", after a former teacher who died in 2020. The school board voted in April 2021 to change the school's names to Alexandria City High School and Naomi L. Brooks Elementary School.

== Schools ==
The Alexandria City Public Schools consists of the following schools.

=== Early Education ===
- Early Childhood Center

=== Elementary schools ===
- John Adams Elementary School (Grades PreK–5)
- Charles Barrett Elementary School (Grades PreK–5), named for Charles D. Barrett, a Marine officer killed in World War II who had lived in Alexandria
- Ferdinand T. Day Elementary School, named after civil rights icon Ferdinand T. Day, who was the first African American elected chair of a public school board
- Cora Kelly School for Math, Science and Technology (Grades PreK–5), named for local former teacher Cora Webster Kelly
- Lyles-Crouch Traditional Academy
- Douglas MacArthur Elementary School
- George Mason Elementary School
- Naomi L. Brooks Elementary School
- Mount Vernon Community School
- James K. Polk Elementary School
- William Ramsay Elementary School (Grades PreK–5)
- Samuel W. Tucker Elementary School, named for Alexandria native and notable civil rights lawyer Samuel W. Tucker

=== K–8 schools ===
- Patrick Henry PreK-8 School (Grades PreK–8)
- Jefferson-Houston PreK-8 IB School (Grades PreK–8)

=== Middle schools ===
- George Washington Middle School
- Francis C. Hammond Middle School, named for Francis C. Hammond, a native Alexandrian who was killed in action during the Korean War and received the Medal of Honor

=== High schools ===
- Alexandria City High School
- Alexandria City High School Minnie Howard Campus

== See also ==
- List of school divisions in Virginia
