= Francis C. Hammond =

US Navy corpsman and Medal of Honor recipient (1931–1953)

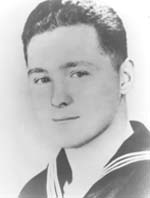
- Hammond in c. 1950s
- Born: November 9, 1931; Alexandria, Virginia, US
- Died: March 26, 1953 (aged 21); Yeoncheon, Korea
- Burial place: Arlington National Cemetery
- Military career
- Allegiance: United States
- Branch: United States Navy
- Service years: 1951–1953
- Rank: Hospitalman
- Units: C Company, 1st Battalion 5th Marines, 1st Marine Division
- Conflicts: Korean War: Battle for Outpost Vegas †
- Awards: Medal of Honor; Purple Heart (2)

Francis Colton Hammond (November 9, 1931 – March 26, 1953) was a United States Navy hospital corpsman who was killed in action while serving with a Marine Corps rifle company during the Korean War. He posthumously received the Medal of Honor for his heroic actions above and beyond the call of duty during the night of March 26–27, 1953 during the Battle for Outpost Vegas.

== Early life ==
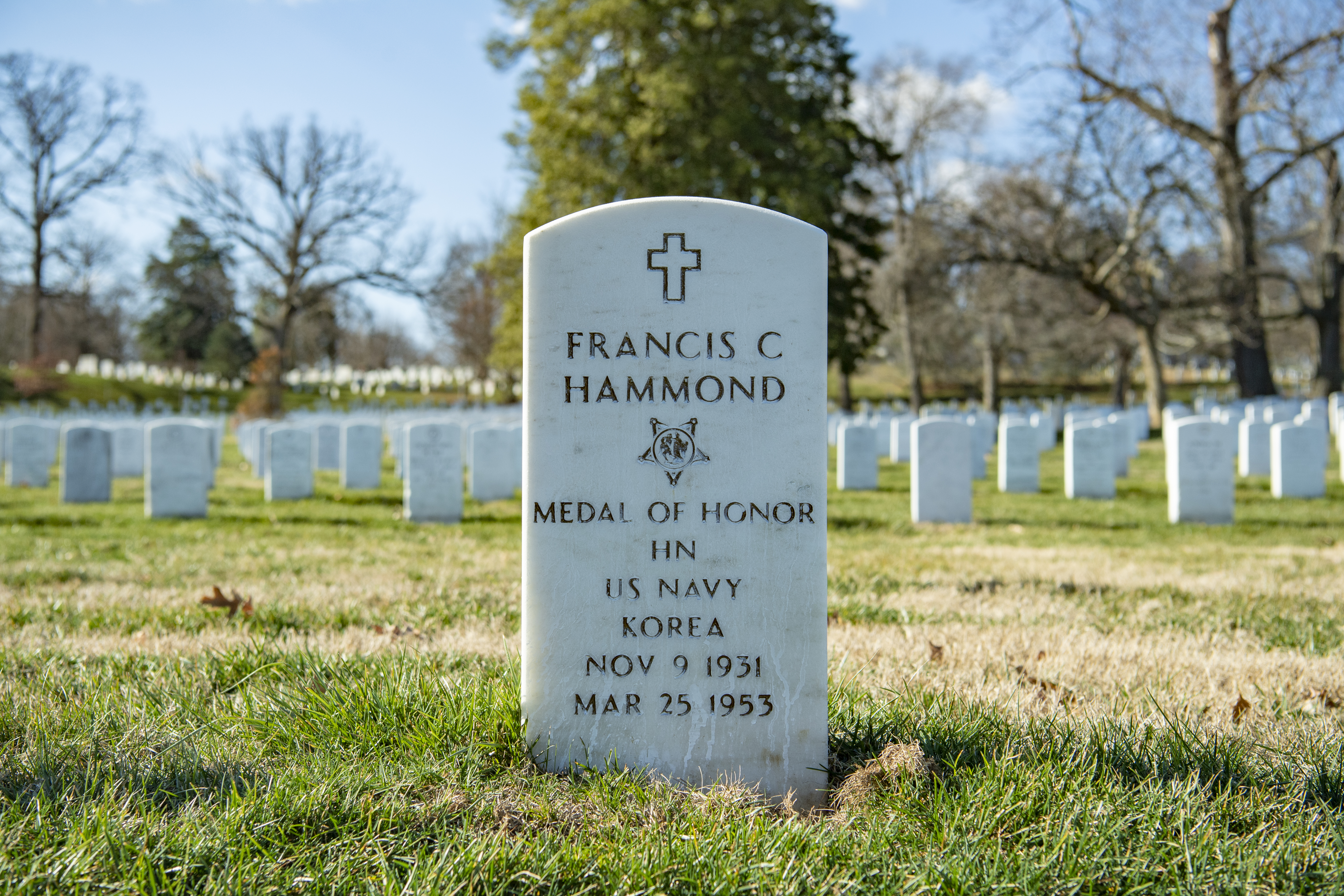
Grave at Arlington National Cemetery

Born and raised mostly in Alexandria, Virginia, Hammond graduated from Alexandria's George Washington High School in January 1951.

== Korean War ==
Hammond joined the United States Navy from Alexandria on March 20, 1951. He was sent to and arrived in Korea on February 1, 1953, assigned to 3rd Platoon, C Company, 1st Battalion, 5th Marine Regiment, 1st Marine Division. During the night of March 26, he was killed in action at Outpost Reno. During a counterattack against an entrenched enemy force, he exposed himself to intense hostile fire in order to attend to wounded Marines, even after he had been wounded himself. When a relief unit arrived and his own unit was ordered to pull back, Hammond remained in the area, helping evacuate casualties and assisting the newly arrived corpsmen. While doing this, he was killed by mortar fire. For his heroic actions on March 26–27, he was posthumously awarded the Medal of Honor in September 1953.

Hammond, age 21, was buried on June 10, 1953, at Arlington National Cemetery.

Hammond who had been married on June 19, 1952, was survived by his wife Phyllis and a son, Francis, Jr. His wife and son were posthumously presented Hammond's Medal of Honor by Secretary of the Navy Robert B. Anderson during a ceremony at the White House in late December 1953.

== Medal of Honor citation ==
Hammond's official Medal of Honor citation reads:

The President of the United States in the name of the Congress takes pride in presenting the Medal of Honor posthumously to

HOSPITALMAN FRANCIS C. HAMMOND
UNITED STATES NAVY

for service as set forth in the following

CITATION:

For conspicuous gallantry and intrepidity at the risk of his life above and beyond the call of duty as a[n] HC serving with the 1st Marine Division in action against enemy aggressor forces on the night of 26–27 March 1953. After reaching an intermediate objective during a counterattack against a heavily entrenched and numerically superior hostile force occupying ground on a bitterly contested outpost far in advance of the main line of resistance, HC Hammond's platoon was subjected to a murderous barrage of hostile mortar and artillery fire, followed by a vicious assault by onrushing enemy troops. Resolutely advancing through the veritable curtain of fire to aid his stricken comrades, HC Hammond moved among the stalwart garrison of marines and, although critically wounded himself, valiantly continued to administer aid to the other wounded throughout an exhausting 4-hour period. When the unit was ordered to withdraw, he skillfully directed the evacuation of casualties and remained in the fire-swept area to assist the corpsmen of the relieving unit until he was struck by a round of enemy mortar fire and fell, mortally wounded. By his exceptional fortitude, inspiring initiative and self-sacrificing efforts, HC Hammond undoubtedly saved the lives of many marines. His great personal valor in the face of overwhelming odds enhances and sustains the finest traditions of the U.S. Naval Service. He gallantly gave his life for his country.

— Harry S. Truman

== Awards and Decorations ==

1st row	Medal of Honor	Purple Heart with 5/16 inch star	Combat Action Ribbon Retroactively Awarded, 1999
2nd row	Navy Presidential Unit Citation	National Defense Service Medal	Korean Service Medal with Fleet Marine Force Insignia and 1 Campaign star
3rd row	Korean Presidential Unit Citation	United Nations Service Medal Korea	Korean War Service Medal Retroactively Awarded, 2003

== Honors ==
A new high school in Hammond's hometown of Alexandria was named in his honor and opened in 1956. Alexandria City Public Schools changed to a 6-2-2-2 configuration in 1971, and the city's three high schools changed from four-year to two-year campuses. All of the city's juniors and seniors attended the newest high school, T.C. Williams, while Hammond and George Washington split the freshmen and sophomores. Both Hammond and George Washington became junior high schools (grades 7–9) in 1979 and then middle schools (grades 6–8) in 1993.

The frigate USS Francis Hammond (FF-1067) was named in his honor and commissioned on July 25, 1970.

== See also ==
- List of Korean War Medal of Honor recipients
