= George Washington Middle School (Virginia) =

Public middle school in Virginia, US

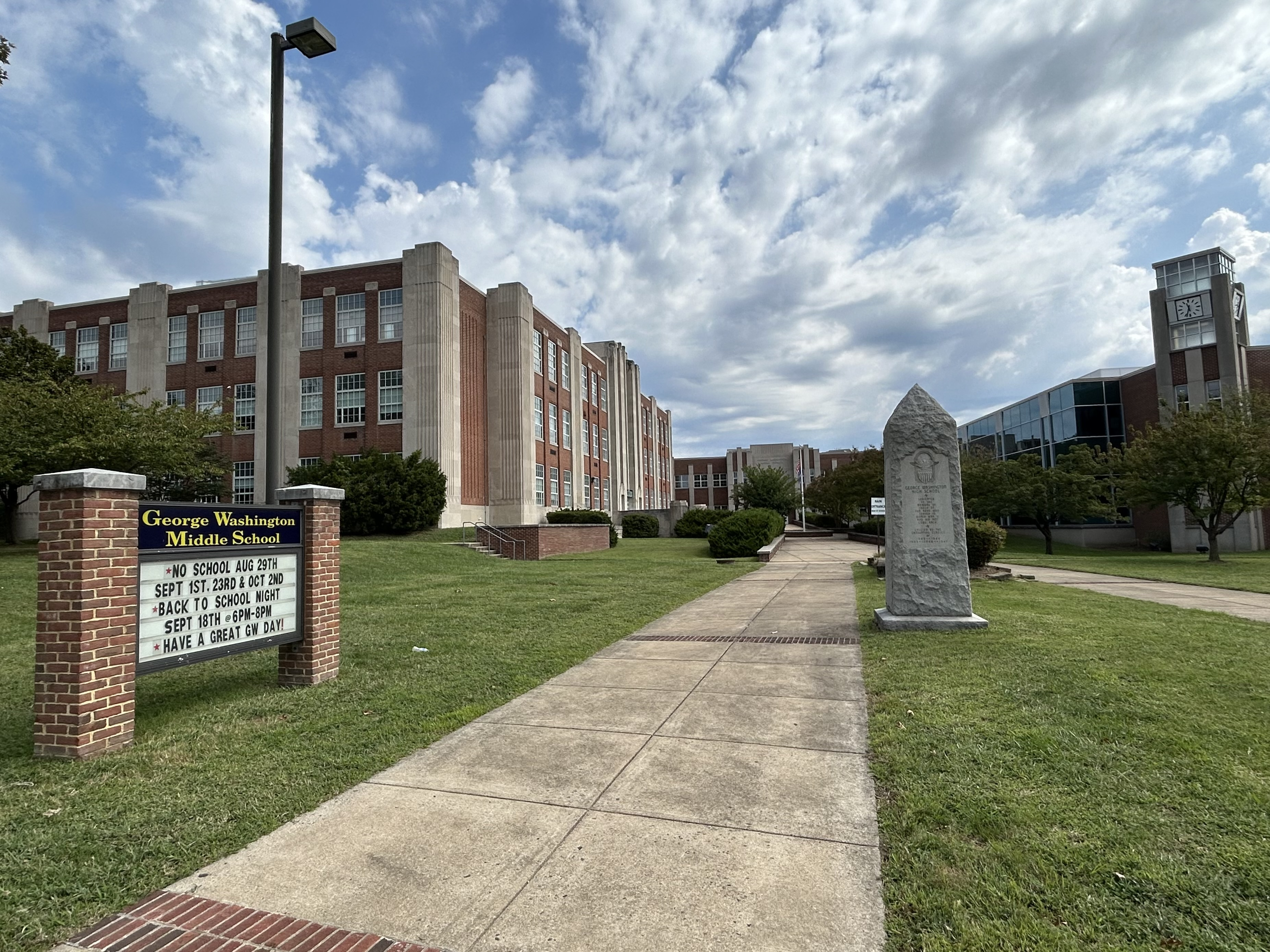
- George Washington Middle School in 2025

Location
- 1005 Mount Vernon Avenue; Alexandria, Virginia; United States; 38.815°N 77.055°W

Information
- Type: Public
- Opened: 1935
- School district: Alexandria City Public Schools
- Principal: Jeanette Vinson (as of 8/21/2023)
- Grades: 6th-8th
- Enrollment: 1,530 (as of 8/19/2024)
- Colors: Blue and Yellow
- Nickname: Prexies
- Newspaper: www.acpsk12.org/news/
- Website: gw.acps.k12.va.us
- George Washington High School
- U.S. National Register of Historic Places
- Virginia Landmarks Register
- Location within Virginia
- Location: 1005 Mount Vernon Ave., Alexandria, Virginia
- Area: 23.87 acres (9.66 ha)
- NRHP reference No.: 100005803
- VLR No.: 100-0160

Significant dates
- Added to NRHP: May 26, 2021
- Designated VLR: September 17, 2020

George Washington Middle School is a public school in Alexandria, Virginia. It is located at 1005 Mount Vernon Avenue and is part of Alexandria City Public Schools (ACPS). Named after the nation's first president, it originally opened in 1935 as a high school; it consolidated the city's two previous schools, Alexandria and George Mason. The Tulloch Memorial Gym was built in 1952. As many as nine classes at a time are now held each period in the gym or the classrooms connected to it. In 1971, the city's school district moved to a 6-2-2-2 configuration, and reassigned its three high schools from four-year to two-year campuses. The newest, T.C. Williams, took all of the city's juniors and seniors, while Francis C. Hammond and George Washington split the freshmen and sophomores. Both became junior high schools in 1979, with grades 7–9, and middle schools in 1993, with grades 6–8.

Beginning in the 2009–2010 school year, both were split into several smaller schools with George Washington split into the two schools, George Washington 1 and George Washington 2 and Francis C. Hammond split into Francis C. Hammond 1, 2, and 3. Former superintendent Morton Sherman believes that smaller schools will provide, "...personalization, engagement, and customization for higher levels of achievement for all students." However, this change was later revoked, and George Washington and Francis Hammond are both united schools now. Both middle schools also began to follow the International Baccalaureate Middle Years Programme curriculum. This was also changed, and now only Jefferson-Houston School follows the International Baccalaureate Middle Years Programme curriculum.

== Demographics ==
- (as of 8/21/2024)
- Enrollment 1530+
- African American 17%
- Hispanic 33%
- White 44%
- Other 6% (Asian, Pacific Islander, American Indian)

== AFL preseason game ==
In 1965, GWHS hosted a pre-season American Football League game on August 7, between the New York Jets and Houston Oilers. It was a charity benefit sponsored by Kena Temple, the local Shriners organization, and was wrapped into the city's annual "Alexandria Days" summer festival,—and was known for being the professional debut of Joe Namath.

== Notable alumni ==
- Francis Hammond, class of 1949, posthumously awarded the Medal of Honor in 1953 for his actions during the Korean War. A new high school in Alexandria was named for him in 1956, now a middle school
- Willard Scott of NBC's The Today Show, class of 1951
- John Phillips, the Mamas & the Papas, class of 1953
- Cass Elliot, the Mamas & the Papas, class of 1961
- Jim Morrison of the Doors, class of 1961
- Guy Gardner, astronaut, class of 1965
- Skeeter Swift, pro basketball player, class of 1965
- Dermot Mulroney, actor, 1977-1979
