= Remember the Titans =

2000 film by Boaz Yakin

- Theatrical release poster
- Directed by: Boaz Yakin
- Written by: Gregory Allen Howard
- Produced by: Jerry Bruckheimer; Chad Oman
- Starring: Denzel Washington; Will Patton; Donald Faison; Nicole Ari Parker
- Cinematography: Philippe Rousselot
- Edited by: Michael Tronick
- Music by: Trevor Rabin
- Production companies: Walt Disney Pictures; Jerry Bruckheimer Films; Technical Black Films
- Distributed by: Buena Vista Pictures Distribution
- Release date: September 29, 2000
- Running time: 113 minutes
- Country: United States
- Language: English
- Budget: $30 million
- Box office: $136.8 million

Remember the Titans is a 2000 American biographical sports drama film directed by Boaz Yakin and produced by Jerry Bruckheimer. The screenplay by Gregory Allen Howard is loosely based on the true story of coach Herman Boone, portrayed by Denzel Washington, and his attempt to racially integrate the T. C. Williams High School (now Alexandria City High School) football team in Alexandria, Virginia in 1971. Will Patton portrays Bill Yoast, Boone's assistant coach. Real-life athletes Gerry Bertier and Julius Campbell are portrayed by Ryan Hurst and Wood Harris, respectively.

The film was co-produced by Walt Disney Pictures, Jerry Bruckheimer Films and Technical Black Films and released by Buena Vista Pictures Distribution. On September 19, 2000, the film's soundtrack was released by Walt Disney Records. It features songs by several recording artists including Creedence Clearwater Revival, Bob Dylan, The Hollies, Marvin Gaye, James Taylor, Shocking Blue, The Temptations, Cat Stevens, Buck Owens, and Steam.

Remember the Titans had a budget of $30 million and premiered in theaters nationwide in the United States on September 29, 2000. It grossed an estimated $115.6 million in the U.S., and $136.8 million worldwide. While the film was not particularly well-received at the time, it is now considered to be one of the greatest football films of all time.

== Plot ==
In the spring of 1981, a group of former football coaches and players attend a funeral for a former football player.

Ten years earlier, in the summer of 1971, head coach Bill Yoast of the newly consolidated T. C. Williams High School in Alexandria, Virginia, is leading his white football players in summer workouts. In the midst of the city's racial animus, Yoast meets Herman Boone, a black coach from North Carolina originally hired to lead the city's black high school football team who has instead been assigned to Yoast's coaching staff. Later, in an attempt to placate rising racial tensions and the fact that all other high schools in Alexandria are "whites only" (despite the abolition of racial segregation in public schools), the school district decides to name Boone the head coach of T. C. Williams. Boone initially refuses, believing it is unfair to Yoast, a successful coach who has been nominated to the Virginia High School Hall of Fame, but relents after seeing what it means to the black community. Boone offers to retain Yoast on his staff but is rebuffed when Yoast takes offense to the prospect of working under a black coach. When Yoast tells his white players that he will accept a head coach position elsewhere, they pledge to boycott the team if he is not their coach. Dismayed at the prospect of the students losing their chances at scholarships, Yoast changes his mind and decides to accept Boone's offer to serve as his assistant head coach and defensive coordinator.

Boone holds his first team meeting with mostly black students in the school gymnasium, but is interrupted by the arrival of Yoast, his coaching staff, and several white players. Yoast informs Boone of his decision, but Boone warns Yoast that the Titans are his team, and he will not tolerate Yoast undermining him. On August 15, the players go to Gettysburg College for training camp. Early on, the black and white team members frequently clash in racially motivated conflicts, especially between defensive captains Gerry Bertier (white) and Julius Campbell (black). However, through forceful coaching, rigorous training, and a motivational early-morning run to the Gettysburg National Cemetery followed by an emotional speech by Boone, the team comes together and returns as a united group. Before their first game, Boone is told by a school board member that if the Titans lose even a single game, Boone will be dismissed, and Yoast will reassume the position of head coach. Subsequently, the Titans go through the season undefeated while battling racial prejudice and slowly gaining support from the community.

Just before the state semi-finals, Yoast is told by the Hall of Fame's executive director that they have arranged for the Titans to lose so that Boone will be dismissed and Yoast reinstated as head coach. During the game, the officials make several biased calls against the Titans. Upon seeing the Hall's director and T. C. Williams' athletic director in the stands looking on with satisfaction, along with his daughter's reactions to the calls against the Titans, Yoast marches onto the field to warn the referee that if the game is not officiated fairly, he will expose the scandal to the press. After this, Yoast encourages the defense to play aggressively and Boone to run up the score on offense. The Titans win in a blowout and advance to the state championship, but Yoast is told by the infuriated director that his actions have cost him the support of the Hall's voters, though the team supports him regardless.

That night, while celebrating the victory, Gerry is severely injured in a car accident and is paralyzed from the waist down. Despite the loss of the All-American linebacker, the Titans enter halftime of the state championship game trailing by only seven points. In the locker room, Boone, Campbell, and Yoast give impassioned speeches that inspire the Titans to mount a fourth quarter comeback. The Titans score a touchdown on the game's final play to win the state title and complete an undefeated season.

After winning a gold medal in shot put in the Paralympic Games, Gerry dies in another car crash caused by a drunk driver on March 20, 1981. It is his funeral that the former football coaches and players were attending in the opening scene. Julius, whom Gerry's mother formerly disliked, is now holding her hand as he leads the team in a mournful rendition of "Na Na Hey Hey Kiss Him Goodbye".

In the epilogue, descriptions show the players' and coaches' activities after the events in 1971. Coach Boone coached the Titans for five more seasons before retirement, while Coach Yoast assisted Boone for four more years, retiring from coaching in 1990; the two coaches became good friends. After Gerry's death, the gymnasium at T.C. Williams High was renamed after him. Julius worked for the city of Alexandria and remained friends with Gerry until his death.

== Cast ==
- Denzel Washington as Herman Boone
- Will Patton as Bill Yoast
- Wood Harris as Julius Campbell
- Ryan Hurst as Gerry Bertier
- Donald Faison as Petey Jones
- Ethan Suplee as Louie Lastik
- Nicole Ari Parker as Carol Boone
- Hayden Panettiere as Sheryl Yoast
- Kip Pardue as Ronnie "Sunshine" Bass
- Craig Kirkwood as Jerry "Rev" Harris
- Kate Bosworth as Emma Hoyt
- Ryan Gosling as Alan Bosley
- Burgess Jenkins as Ray Budds
- Earl C. Poitier as Darryl "Blue" Stanton
- Neal Ghant as Frankie Glascoe
- Gregory Alan Williams as Paul "Doc" Hines

== Production ==
=== Filming ===
Filming locations for the motion picture included the campus of Paulding County High School, where the home games were filmed. Berry College in Rome, Georgia, Etowah High School in Woodstock, and in Atlanta, Georgia including Henry Grady High School and Druid Hills High School which both filled in for T.C. Williams High School. Practice scenes were filmed at Clarkston High School in Clarkston, Georgia. Additionally, some of the championship game scenes were filmed at the Sprayberry High School football stadium in East Marietta, Georgia.

=== Historical accuracy ===
As with any movie that is not a documentary film but is rather "based on a true story", it has strayed from the actual events that had occurred on many occasions to add new dramatic elements of teamwork, commitment, and friendship to the film.

- Alexandria City Schools were desegregated in 1959 and T.C. Williams was created by merging three racially integrated schools.
- The Titans were ranked second in the nation at the end of the 1971 season, finishing 13–0. However, despite the movie showing multiple close games, most games were actually blowouts, with nine of their 13 wins being shutouts.
- In the film, Coach Boone states, "We are not like all the other schools in this conference, they're all white. They don't have to worry about race. We do." This is false as well; all the schools the Titans faced were integrated years before.
- While the team is at camp, it shows Coach Boone waking them up at 3:00 a.m. to go for a run. This did not occur; neither did his speech at Gettysburg. The team did go on a tour of Gettysburg, although it was not as dramatic as portrayed in the film.
- Ronnie "Sunshine" Bass was far from being the only one with long hair at the time. Even Gerry Bertier had long hair. But in interviews, Bass said, "I'll say for the record my hair was never that long." He also says the kiss with Gerry never happened.
- Ray did not exist in real life, and Titans players said if he did, he would have been cut in training camp.
- The climax of the film is a fictionalized 1971 AAA state championship football game between T. C. Williams and George C. Marshall High School. The dramatic license taken in the movie was to convert what was actually a mid-season match-up between T. C. Williams and Marshall into a made-for-Hollywood state championship. In reality, the Marshall game was the toughest game T. C. Williams played all year. As depicted in the movie, the real Titans won the Marshall game on a fourth down come-from-behind play at the very end of the game. The actual state championship (against Andrew Lewis High School of Salem) was a 27–0 shutout, played at Victory Stadium in Roanoke.
- Bertier's car accident took place on December 11, 1971, after (rather than before) the season-ending State Championship game. He had been at a banquet honoring the team for their undefeated season. After the banquet, Bertier borrowed his mother's new 1971 Chevrolet Camaro. Bertier lost control of the Camaro and crashed (the movie shows him getting broadsided). The cause of the accident was determined to be a mechanical failure in the engine mounts.
- Sheryl Yoast (who died in 1996 of an undetected heart condition at the age of 34) was not an only child as portrayed but had three sisters. Her oldest sister Bonnie was in college, her second oldest Angela went to a different high school, and her younger sister Deidre was only three years old in 1971.
- The film omits that in 1979 Boone was relieved of his coaching duties by the principal who felt "a change was needed." The principal denied it was related to any allegations of player abuse which were never substantiated. Boone continued to work as the head of the school's physical education department.

== Music ==
On September 19, 2000, the soundtrack was released by Walt Disney Records. The film score was orchestrated by musician Trevor Rabin and features music composed by various artists. From the instrumental score, Rabin's track "Titans Spirit", was the only cue (of the 12 composed) added to the soundtrack. It is also the only piece of music on the soundtrack album not to have been previously released.

"Titans Spirit" is a seven-minute instrumental. It has been used on numerous sports telecasts, particularly those on NBC, which has utilized the score during its closing credits for each Olympic Games since 2002, as well as the final closing credits montage ending their 12-year run of NBA coverage in 2002. The song was also played as veteran New York Mets players crossed home plate during the closing ceremonies at Shea Stadium, and as the New York Yankees were awarded their rings from their 2009 World Series championship. The New Jersey Devils also used this song during the jersey number retirement ceremonies for Scott Stevens, Ken Daneyko, Scott Niedermayer, Martin Brodeur and Patrik Eliáš. In 2018, at the conclusion of the Stanley Cup playoffs, the song was used during the Washington Capitals' Stanley Cup celebration as captain Alexander Ovechkin lifted the Cup in Las Vegas.

It was also used during the 2008 Democratic National Convention to accompany the celebration and fireworks at Invesco Field after future president Barack Obama gave his nomination acceptance speech, and was also used immediately following his victory speech upon winning the 2008 Presidential Election.

Although not included on the soundtrack, "Them Changes" by Buddy Miles is heard playing early on in the film.

=== Soundtrack ===
Remember the Titans: An Original Walt Disney Motion Picture Soundtrack

Film score by Various Artists
- Released: September 19, 2000
- Genres: R&B, pop rock
- Length: 46:21
- Label: Walt Disney

Remember the Titans: An Original Walt Disney Motion Picture Soundtrack
No.	Title	Length
1.	"Ain't No Mountain High Enough"	2:23
2.	"Spirit in the Sky"	4:02
3.	"Peace Train"	4:08
4.	"Na Na Hey Hey Kiss Him Goodbye"	4:05
5.	"Long Cool Woman in a Black Dress"	3:17
6.	"I Want to Take You Higher"	2:44
7.	"Up Around the Bend"	2:42
8.	"Spill the Wine"	4:05
9.	"A Hard Rain's a-Gonna Fall"	5:10
10.	"Act Naturally"	2:21
11.	"Express Yourself"	3:53
12.	"Titans Spirit"	7:25
Total length:		46:21

=== Certifications ===
Region	Certification	Certified units/sales
Canada (Music Canada)	Gold	50,000^{^}
United States (RIAA)	Platinum	1,000,000^{^}
^{^} Shipments figures based on certification alone.

== Release ==
=== Home media ===
Following its release in theaters, the Region 1 widescreen and Pan and scan edition of the motion picture was released on VHS and DVD in the United States on March 20, 2001. A Special Edition widescreen format of the film was released on March 20, 2001, along with a widescreen Director's cut on March 14, 2006.

A restored widescreen hi-definition Blu-ray version was released by Walt Disney Studios Home Entertainment on September 4, 2007. Special features include backstage feature audio commentary with director Boaz Yakin, producer Jerry Bruckheimer and writer Gregory Allen Howard, feature audio commentary with real-life coaches Herman Boone and Bill Yoast, "Remember The Titans: An inspirational journey behind the scenes" hosted by Lynn Swann, "Denzel Becomes Boone," "Beating The Odds"; Deleted scenes; Movie Showcase and seamless menus. The film is currently available in 4K UHD on streaming services; however, a physical 4K UHD disc is yet to materialise.

== Reception ==
=== Box office ===
Remember the Titans opened strongly at the U.S. box office, grossing $21,000,000 in its first weekend, beating Urban Legends: Final Cut to reach the number one spot, and staying within the top five for six weeks. In its second weekend, it was overtaken by Meet the Parents, making $19.2 million. The film surpassed Crimson Tide to achieve Denzel Washington's highest opening weekend. It eventually went on to gross an estimated $115,654,751 in the U.S., and $136,706,684 worldwide.

=== Critical response ===
Among mainstream critics in the U.S., Remember the Titans received generally mixed reviews. Rotten Tomatoes reported that 72% of 138 critics gave the film a positive review, with an average score of 6.3/10. The site's consensus states: "An inspirational crowd-pleaser with a healthy dose of social commentary, Remember the Titans may be predictable, but it's also well-crafted and features terrific performances." At Metacritic, which assigns a weighted average score out of 100 to critics' reviews, the film received a score of 48 based on 32 reviews. Audiences polled by CinemaScore gave the film a rare "A+" grade.

James Berardinelli writing for ReelViews, called the film "relentlessly manipulative and hopelessly predictable" but noted that it was "a notch above the average entry in part because its social message (even if it is soft-peddled [sic]) creates a richer fabric than the usual cloth from which this kind of movie is cut." Describing some pitfalls, Robert Wilonsky of the Dallas Observer said that "beneath its rah-rah rhetoric and pigskin proselytizing, it's no more provocative or thoughtful than a Hallmark Hall of Fame film or, for that matter, a Hallmark greeting card. Its heart is in the right place, but it has no soul." Wilonsky however was quick to admit "The film's intentions are noble, but its delivery is ham-fisted and pretentious; you can't deny the message, but you can loathe the messenger without feeling too guilty about it."

'Remember the Titans' has the outer form of a brave statement about the races in America, but the soul of a sports movie in which everything is settled by the obligatory last play in the last seconds of the championship game.

— Roger Ebert, writing in the Chicago Sun-Times

Todd McCarthy, writing in Variety, said, "As simplistic and drained of complexity as the picture is, it may well appeal to mainstream audiences as an 'if only it could be like this' fantasy, as well as on the elemental level of a boot camp training film, albeit a PG-rated one with all the cuss words removed." Roger Ebert, in the Chicago Sun-Times, viewed the film as "a parable about racial harmony, yoked to the formula of a sports movie," adding, "Victories over racism and victories over opposing teams alternate so quickly that sometimes we're not sure if we're cheering for tolerance or touchdowns. Real life is never this simple, but then that's what the movies are for". Michael O'Sullivan of The Washington Post gave the film a scoring of one out of four and wrote, "Toss it in the bin along with The Replacements, but give it bonus points, at least, for having a social conscience."

In the San Francisco Chronicle, Mick LaSalle wrote that the film reminds the viewer that "it's possible to make a sentimental drama that isn't sickening — and a sports movie that transcends cliches." Columnist Bob Grimm of the Sacramento News & Review, somewhat praised the film, writing, "The film is quite lightweight for the subject matter, but Washington and company make it watchable." Some detractors like Owen Gleiberman of Entertainment Weekly wrote, "Denzel Washington should have held out for a better script before he signed on to star in Remember the Titans, but you can see why he wanted to do the movie: He gets to play Martin Luther King Jr. and Vince Lombardi rolled into one nostalgically omnipotent tough-love saint." Jeff Vice of the Deseret News admitted that although the film contained dialogue that was "corny, clichéd, and downright cheesy at times," as well as how it relayed its message in one of the "most predictable, heavy-handed manners we've seen in a movie in years", the film "serves as a reminder of how much goodness there is inside people, just waiting for the right person to bring it out." He also viewed the casting as top-notch, saying that it helped to have a "rock-solid foundation in the form of leading-man Denzel Washington" at the helm.

=== Accolades ===
The film was nominated and won several awards in 2000–2001.

Award	Category	Nominee	Result
2001 Angel Awards	Silver Angel	————	Nominated
BET Awards 2001	Best Actor	Denzel Washington	Won
2001 BMI Film & TV Awards	Film Music Award	Trevor Rabin	Won
Black Reel Awards of 2001	Best Actor	Denzel Washington	Won
Black Reel Awards of 2001	Best Screenplay	Gregory Allen Howard	Won
Black Reel Awards of 2001	Best Film	Jerry Bruckheimer, Chad Oman	Nominated
2001 Blockbuster Entertainment Awards	Favorite Actor - Drama	Denzel Washington	Nominated
2001 Blockbuster Entertainment Awards	Favorite Supporting Actor - Drama	Wood Harris	Nominated
2001 Casting Society of America Awards	Best Casting for Feature Film - Drama	Ronna Kress	Nominated
2001 NAACP Image Awards	Outstanding Actor in a Motion Picture	Denzel Washington	Won
2001 NAACP Image Awards	Outstanding Motion Picture	————	Won
2001 NAACP Image Awards	Outstanding Supporting Actor in a Motion Picture	Wood Harris	Nominated
2001 NAACP Image Awards	Outstanding Supporting Actress in a Motion Picture	Nicole Ari Parker	Nominated
2001 NAACP Image Awards	Outstanding Youth Actor/Actress	Krysten Leigh Jones	Nominated
Las Vegas Film Critics Society Awards 2000	Best Male Newcomer	Kip Pardue	Nominated
Las Vegas Film Critics Society Awards 2000	Youth in Film	Hayden Panettiere	Nominated
2001 Motion Picture Sound Editors Awards	Best Sound Editing - Dialogue & ADR	Robert L. Sephton, Christopher T. Welch, Julie Feiner, Cindy Marty, Gaston Biraben, Suhail Kafity	Nominated
2001 Motion Picture Sound Editors Awards	Best Sound Editing - Music	Will Kaplan	Nominated
Phoenix Film Critics Society Awards 2000	Best Performance by a Youth in a Leading or Supporting Role	Hayden Panettiere	Nominated
2001 Political Film Society Awards	Human Rights	————	Won
2001 Political Film Society Awards	Exposé	————	Nominated
Golden Satellite Awards 2000	Best Performance by an Actor in a Motion Picture Drama	Denzel Washington	Nominated
2001 Teen Choice Awards	Film - Choice Drama/Action Adventure	————	Nominated
22nd Young Artist Awards	Best Performance in a Feature Film - Supporting Young Actress	Hayden Panettiere	Won
22nd Young Artist Awards	Best Family Feature Film - Drama	————	Nominated
American Film Institute	AFI's 100 Years...100 Cheers	————	Nominated

== See also ==
- List of American football films
- Coach Carter
