= Francis C. Hammond Middle School =

Public middle school in Virginia, US

Coordinates: 38.826°N 77.111°W

- 4646 Seminary Road, Alexandria, Virginia; United States

Information
- Former name: Francis C. Hammond High School
- Established: 1956

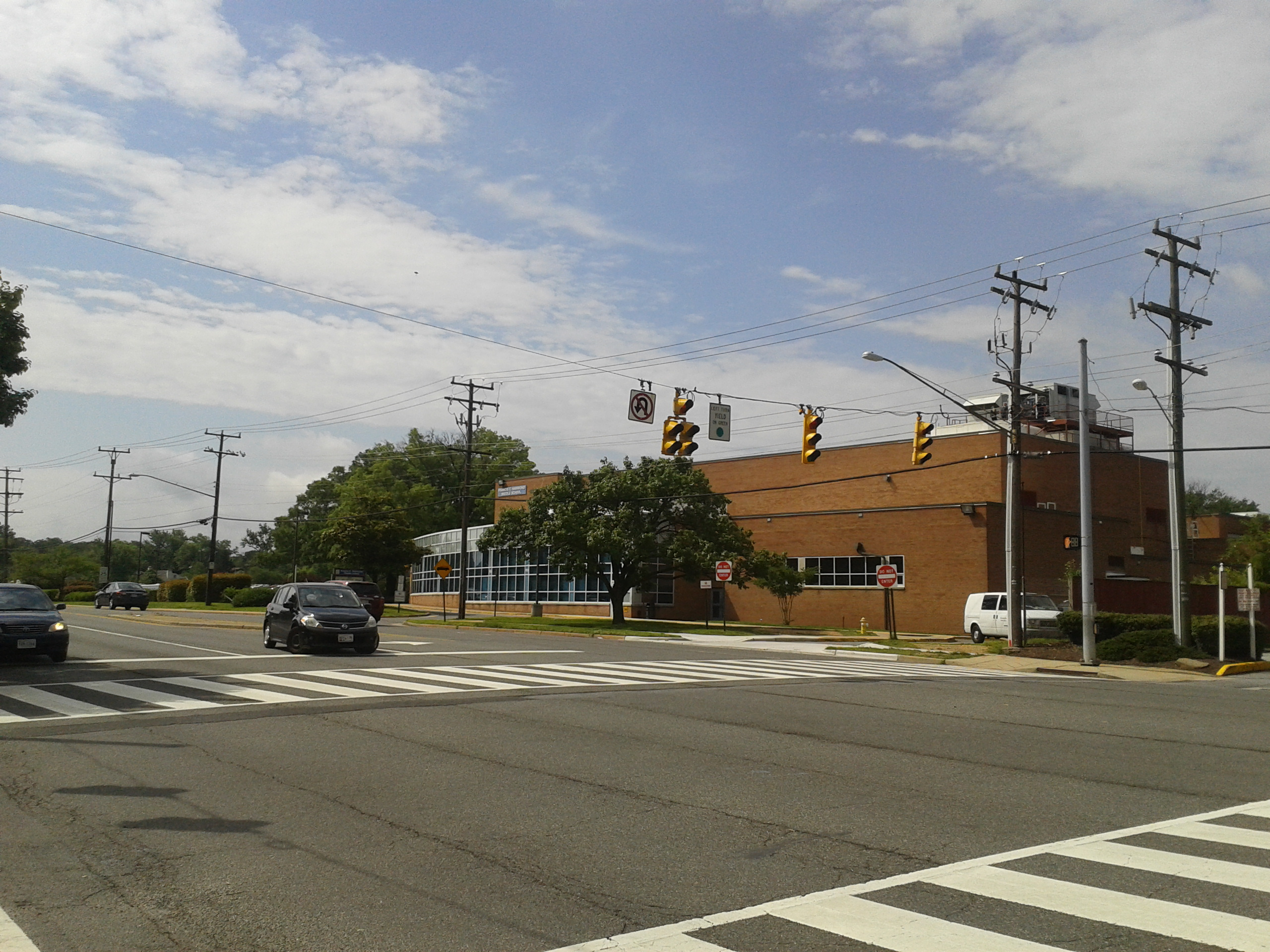
Francis C. Hammond Middle School in 2017

Francis C. Hammond Middle School in Alexandria, Virginia, is located at 4646 Seminary Road in the west end of the city. Opened as a four-year high school in 1956, it was named after Alexandria native Francis Hammond (1931–1953), a U.S. Navy hospital corpsman who was posthumously awarded the Medal of Honor for his actions in the Korean War.

== History ==
In 1971, Alexandria City Public Schools (ACPS) changed to a 6-2-2-2 system, and reassigned its three high schools from four-year to two-year campuses. The newest and most geographically central, T.C. Williams, took all of the city's juniors and seniors, while Hammond and George Washington split the freshmen and sophomores. Prior to the consolidation, the city was approximately one-fifth black, but Hammond High School's student body in the spring of 1971 was nearly all white. Both Hammond and George Washington became junior high schools in 1979, with grades 7-9, and middle schools in 1993, with grades 6-8.

In 2009, Morton Sherman, superintendent for ACPS, introduced a new plan for the school system's two middle schools, to have numerous schools inside one building. This was designed to allow students to have a more personalized education in smaller schools. Hammond had three schools (e.g., FCH 1, FCH2, FCH3), while George Washington Middle School had two schools (e.g. GW1, GW2). Starting in the 2014–15 school year the schools were unified again, with students either attending Francis C. Hammond or George Washington.

== Demographics ==
As of June 2024, the 1413 students at Francis C. Hammond are 33% Black or African American, 43% Hispanic, 14% White, 8% Asian, 2% Multi-racial, <1% Native American, and <1% Native Hawaiian/Pacific Islander.

== Notable alumni ==
- Jack Fisk, production designer and director, Class of 1964
- Angus King, Senator from Maine, Class of 1962
- David Lynch, filmmaker, Class of 1964
