= USS Francis Hammond =

US Navy frigate

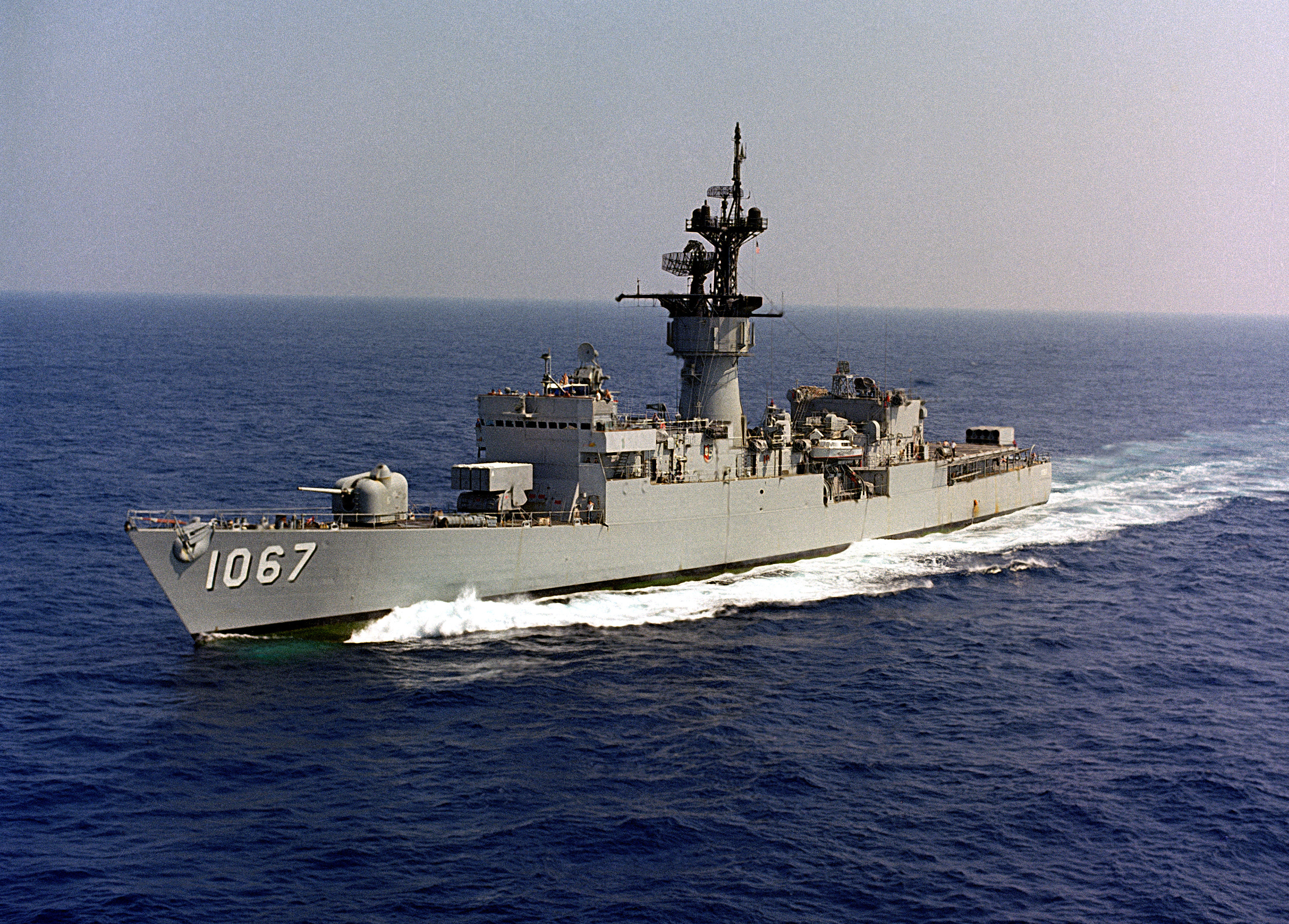
- USS Francis Hammond (FF-1067)

History

United States
- Name: Francis Hammond
- Namesake: Francis Hammond
- Ordered: 22 July 1964
- Builder: Todd Shipyards, Los Angeles Division, San Pedro, California
- Laid down: 15 July 1967
- Launched: 11 May 1968
- Acquired: 17 July 1970
- Commissioned: 25 July 1970
- Decommissioned: 2 July 1992
- Stricken: 11 January 1995
- Motto: Valor Honor
- Fate: Scrapped, 31 March 2003

General characteristics
- Class & type: Knox-class frigate
- Displacement: 3,243 tons (4,244 full load)
- Length: 438 ft (133.5 m)
- Beam: 46 ft 9 in (14.2 m)
- Draft: 24 ft 9 in (7.5 m)
- Propulsion: 2 × CE 1,200 psi (8,274 kPa) boilers; 1 Westinghouse geared turbine; 1 shaft, 35,000 shp (26,099 kW)
- Speed: over 27 knots (31 mph; 50 km/h)
- Range: 4,500 nautical miles (8,330 km) at 20 knots (23 mph; 37 km/h)
- Complement: 18 officers, 267 enlisted
- Sensors & processing systems: AN/SPS-40 Air Search Radar; AN/SPS-67 Surface Search Radar; AN/SQS-26 Sonar; AN/SQR-18 Towed array sonar system; Mk68 Gun Fire Control System
- Electronic warfare & decoys: AN/SLQ-32 Electronics Warfare System
- Armament: one Mk-16 8 cell missile launcher for RUR-5 ASROC and Harpoon missiles; one Mk-42 5-inch/54 caliber gun; Mark 46 torpedoes from four single tube launchers); one Mk-25 BPDMS launcher for Sea Sparrow missiles later replaced by one Phalanx CIWS
- Aircraft carried: one SH-2 Seasprite (LAMPS I) helicopter

USS Francis Hammond (DE/FF-1067) is the sixteenth Knox-class frigate, named in honor of Hospitalman Francis Colton Hammond, a Medal of Honor recipient.

== Construction ==
She was originally designed as a Knox-class ocean escort (DE-1067), and was built by Todd Shipyards, Los Angeles Division, San Pedro, California. The ship's keel was laid on 15 July 1967. She was launched on 11 May 1968; sponsored by Mrs. Phyllis Hammond Smith (widow of Hospitalman Hammond). The ship was commissioned at Long Beach Naval Shipyard, Long Beach, California on 25 July 1970.

== Design and description ==
The Knox-class design was derived from the Brooke-class frigate modified to extend range and without a long-range missile system. The ships had an overall length of 438 feet (133.5 m), a beam of 47 feet (14.3 m) and a draft of 25 feet (7.6 m). They displaced 4,066 long tons (4,131 t) at full load. Their crew consisted of 13 officers and 211 enlisted men.

The ships were equipped with one Westinghouse geared steam turbine that drove the single propeller shaft. The turbine was designed to produce 35,000 shaft horsepower (26,000 kW), using steam provided by 2 C-E boilers, to reach the designed speed of 27 knots (50 km/h; 31 mph). The Knox class had a range of 4,500 nautical miles (8,300 km; 5,200 mi) at a speed of 20 knots (37 km/h; 23 mph).

The Knox-class ships were armed with a 5"/54 caliber Mark 42 gun forward and a single 3-inch/50-caliber gun aft. They mounted an eight-round ASROC launcher between the 5-inch (127 mm) gun and the bridge. Close-range anti-submarine defense was provided by two twin 12.75-inch (324 mm) Mk 32 torpedo tubes. The ships were equipped with a torpedo-carrying DASH drone helicopter; its telescoping hangar and landing pad were positioned amidships aft of the mack. Beginning in the 1970s, the DASH was replaced by a SH-2 Seasprite LAMPS I helicopter and the hangar and landing deck were accordingly enlarged. Most ships also had the 3-inch (76 mm) gun replaced by an eight-cell BPDMS missile launcher in the early 1970s.

== Service history ==
As part of the Navy's 1975 ship reclassification, Francis Hammond was reclassified as a frigate (FF-1067) on 30 June 1975.

USS Francis Hammond (DE-1067) was laid down on 15 July 1967 at San Pedro, Calif., by Todd Shipyards, Los Angeles Division; launched on 11 May 1968; sponsored by Mrs. Phyllis Hammond Smith, widow of HM3 Francis C. Hammond; and commissioned on 25 July 1970, Cmdr. John E. Elmore in command.

The 16th of 46 Knox-class destroyer escorts, USS Francis Hammond (DE-1067) was designed for anti-submarine warfare (ASW). Armed with ASROC and torpedoes, her primary mission would be to patrol the Pacific Ocean, locate and identify Soviet submarines, and, in the event of armed conflict, destroy them. It was not until 26 August that she got underway for her first engineering sea trials, with a second set soon to follow on 3 September. USS Francis Hammond (DE-1067) steamed northwards on 24 October 1970 to commence a series of port visits and trials at sea. Her first destination was Treasure Island in San Francisco, Calif., to conduct firefighting and damage control training, as well as provide a few days liberty for her crew (25-30 October).

Getting underway on 3 July 1971, FUSS Francis Hammond (DE-1067) ’s shakedown training went relatively smoothly, though she was unable to complete her naval gunfire support (NGFS) qualifications owing to scheduling issues and a casualty to her gun mount. USS Francis Hammond (DE-1067) left for her Western Pacific (WestPac) deployment on 7 January 1972 in company with other members of DesRon 9, USS John Paul Jones (DDG-32) and Higbee (DD-806). Following her arrival at Subic Bay, Republic of the Philippines (R.P.), on 2 February, USS Francis Hammond (DE-1067) conducted three days of independent steaming exercises (10-12 February) in local waters in order to prepare her crew for the rigors of the deployment ahead.

Following her escort duties, USS Francis Hammond (DE-1067) served on the gunline near the Cua Viet River. Over the course of the next three weeks, she provided fire support for South Vietnam’s counter offensive against Quang Tri City, South Vietnam (Operation Lam Son 72), as well as at Point Allison (Quang Tri), Betsy (Hue), and Claudia (north of Da Nang). On 13 January 1976, USS Francis Hammond (DE-1067) departed Yokosuka to escort Midway while it conducted various exercises. Once this was complete, she returned to Yokosuka for another period of tender availability with Jason (23 January-8 February) and then set a course for Chinhae, South Korea, again escorting Midway en route (9-12 February).

USS Francis Hammond (DE-1067) got underway one last time on 17 March 1992, making two brief visits to Treasure Island, San Francisco (19, 21-22 March), offloading her ammunition at Concord Naval Station (20 March), and conducting a final Tiger Cruise on her journey back to Long Beach (23-24 March). Shortly after arriving back in her home port, she began her decommissioning availability (30 March).

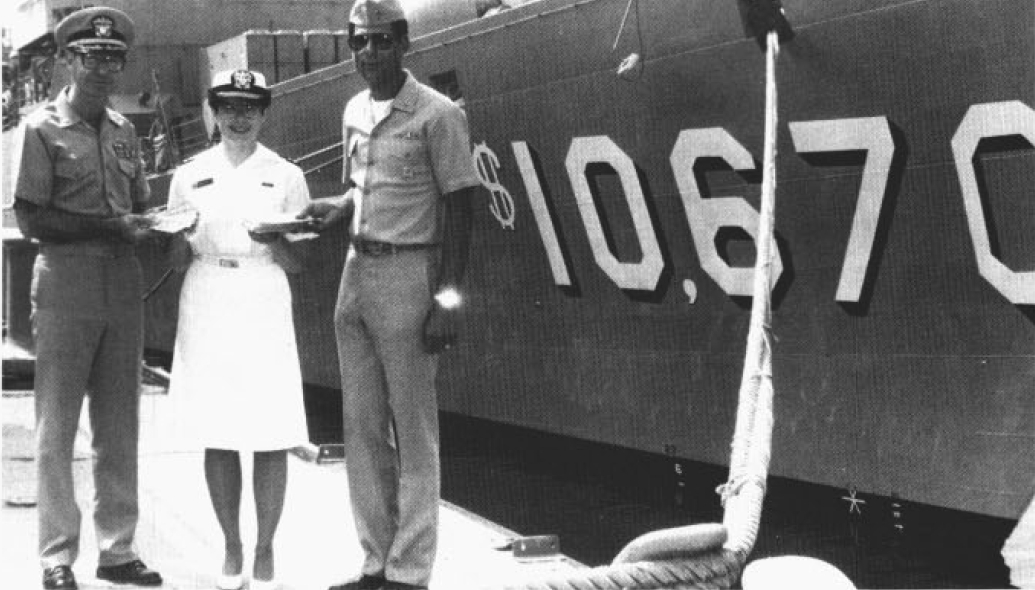
Francis Hammond's repainted hull number of "$10,670". CDR Paul Donaldson and the Command Master Chief present the donation to the base Navy Relief Society representative

In December 1986, after the ship's company of Francis Hammond raised over $11,000 for Navy Relief (beating their goal of ten times the ship's hull number), permission was granted to temporarily add a dollar sign, a thousands separator, and an extra zero to the hull number painted on the side of the ship. The repaint was performed, at night, while at anchor in Sagami-wan, by LCDR Don Pacetti, the ship’s Operations Officer.

Decommissioned 2 July 1992 in Long Beach, California after twenty-one years and nine months in active commission and struck from the Navy Register on 11 January 1995. Francis Hammond was disposed of by scrapping 31 March 2003.

== Awards, citations and campaign ribbons ==
Combat Action Ribbon
Joint Meritorious Unit Award
Navy Unit Commendation
Navy Meritorious Unit Commendation
Navy "E" Ribbon (4)
Navy Expeditionary Medal
National Defense Service Medal (with one bronze service star)
Armed Forces Expeditionary Medal
Vietnam Service Medal (with two bronze service stars)
Southwest Asia Service Medal (with two bronze service stars)
Humanitarian Service Ribbon
Sea Service Deployment Ribbon
Vietnam Campaign Medal
Kuwait Liberation Medal (Saudi Arabia)
Kuwait Liberation Medal (Kuwait)

References : USS Francis Hammond on NavSource
