= Daniel Patrick Boyd =

American terrorist

- Born: 1970 (age 55–56); United States
- Other name: Saifullah
- Occupation: drywall installation contractor
- Spouse: Sabrina Boyd
- Children: Dylan "Mohammed" Boyd; Zakariya Boyd; Luqman Izzudeen Boyd (deceased); Maryum Boyd; Noah Boyd

Daniel Patrick Boyd (born 1970, also known as Saifullah) is an American who in July 2009 was convicted for his participation in a jihadist terrorist cell in North Carolina.

== Early life ==
Boyd graduated from George Mason High School in Falls Church, Virginia, where he was a defensive lineman on the football team. He married his girlfriend, Sabrina, who converted to Islam hours before their wedding.

Boyd worked in construction before moving to Peshawar, Pakistan, in October 1989. He was sponsored by a Muslim relief group to help refugees from the Soviet occupation of Afghanistan by working as a mechanic. He trained with the mujahideen and fought against the Soviet-backed forces in Afghanistan. He took the Muslim name Saifullah ("Sword of God").

In June 1991, Boyd and his brother Charles (also a Muslim convert, working as an engineer in Pakistan) were accused of robbing a branch of United Bank in Hayatabad, a Peshawar suburb. It was also alleged that they carried Hezb-e-Islami Gulbuddin membership cards. In September 1991, a special Islamic court convicted the brothers, who were sentenced to fines, prison terms, and amputation of their right hands and left feet. As the sentence was handed down, Daniel Boyd shouted, "This isn't an Islamic court. It's a court of infidels!" After their convictions, they worked in a prison factory, making carpets and chairs.

In October 1991, an appeals court overturned the conviction. The case made international headlines. Boyd maintained his innocence at the time and asserted that it was all a malicious set-up by a bank employee who had made inappropriate advances toward his wife and had tried to pilfer money from the family.

Returning to the US, Boyd raised his family of five children: sons Dylan, Zakariya, Luqman, and Noah, and daughter Maryam. In July 2004, the Boyds formed Saxum Walls & Ceilings Inc; in April 2007, the family suffered the loss of Luqman "Luke" Izzudeen Boyd, then 16, in a car accident. Late in 2007, Boyd opened Blackstone Market in Garner with business partner Abdenasser Zouhri of Morrisville. A Mediterranean grocery, it offered halal meat and snacks, copies of the Qur'an in English and Arabic, and a place to worship in the back. The store closed in 2008, reportedly due to the recession.

== Arrest and legal proceedings ==
Boyd was arrested by Federal agents along with seven men in North Carolina on July 27, 2009. They were charged with plotting to wage "violent jihad" outside the United States. Boyd was accused of recruiting six men, including two of his sons, to take part in a conspiracy "to advance violent jihad, including supporting and participating in terrorist activities abroad and committing acts of murder, kidnapping, or maiming persons abroad." According to the indictment, members of the group practiced military tactics and the use of weapons in rural North Carolina, and traveled to Gaza, Israel, Jordan, and Kosovo hoping "to engage in violent jihad."

Muslim community members and supporters in North Carolina have been active for him and his co-defendants, and some non-Muslim neighbors and acquaintances in particular have spoken in his defense. A July 30, 2009 CBS news headline about Daniel Boyd is entitled "The Nicest Terrorist I Ever Met," with the subtitle: "Friends, Colleagues and Pakistani Jailers Describe N. Carolina Terror Suspect as Kind, Devoted Muslim." Boyd's older brother Robert Boyd, a practicing Muslim, said the charges sound "like another attempt to associate Islam with terrorism" and the accusations "they're trying to pin on him is pure poppycock as far as I am concerned." Boyd's wife, Sabrina Boyd, has given interviews and written statements professing the Boyds' innocence. Khalilah Sabra, of the Muslim American Society, spoke at a press conference calling on the public not "to rush to judgment", and specifically addressing allegations of terrorist training in Afghanistan, writing that "He was there fighting against the Soviets with the full backing of the United States government, [...] I think he thought it was part of his patriotic duty as a Muslim and an American to go there and fight." At Boyd's August 5 detention hearing, at least 100 supporters (relatives, friends, and acquaintances) were in attendance at the federal courthouse in Raleigh; some expressed the belief that the defendants had not violated the law.

On February 9, 2011, at the United States District Court in New Bern, North Carolina, Daniel Patrick Boyd pleaded guilty to two counts of the Second Superseding Indictment: conspiracy to provide material support to terrorists, and conspiracy to commit murder, maiming, and kidnapping overseas. The second count carries a potential life sentence. The government agreed to dismiss nine counts against him in exchange for his plea and cooperation against the remaining defendants.

Ultimately, Boyd cooperated with the government, as noted by federal prosecutors during the sentencing hearing on August 24, 2012. After pleading guilty to two counts of the superseding indictment in 2011, Boyd testified at trial against several of his co-conspirators who were convicted in October 2011.

Boyd was sentenced to 18 years of imprisonment, followed by five years supervised release, and a $3,000 fine. "We must be ever vigilant in the pursuit of those who seek to destroy our way of life. This prosecution is evidence of our commitment to do so," stated U.S. Attorney Thomas G. Walker.

Boyd was released from prison in December 2024 following his participation in a re-entry program.
