= Alexandria City High School =

Public high school in Virginia, US

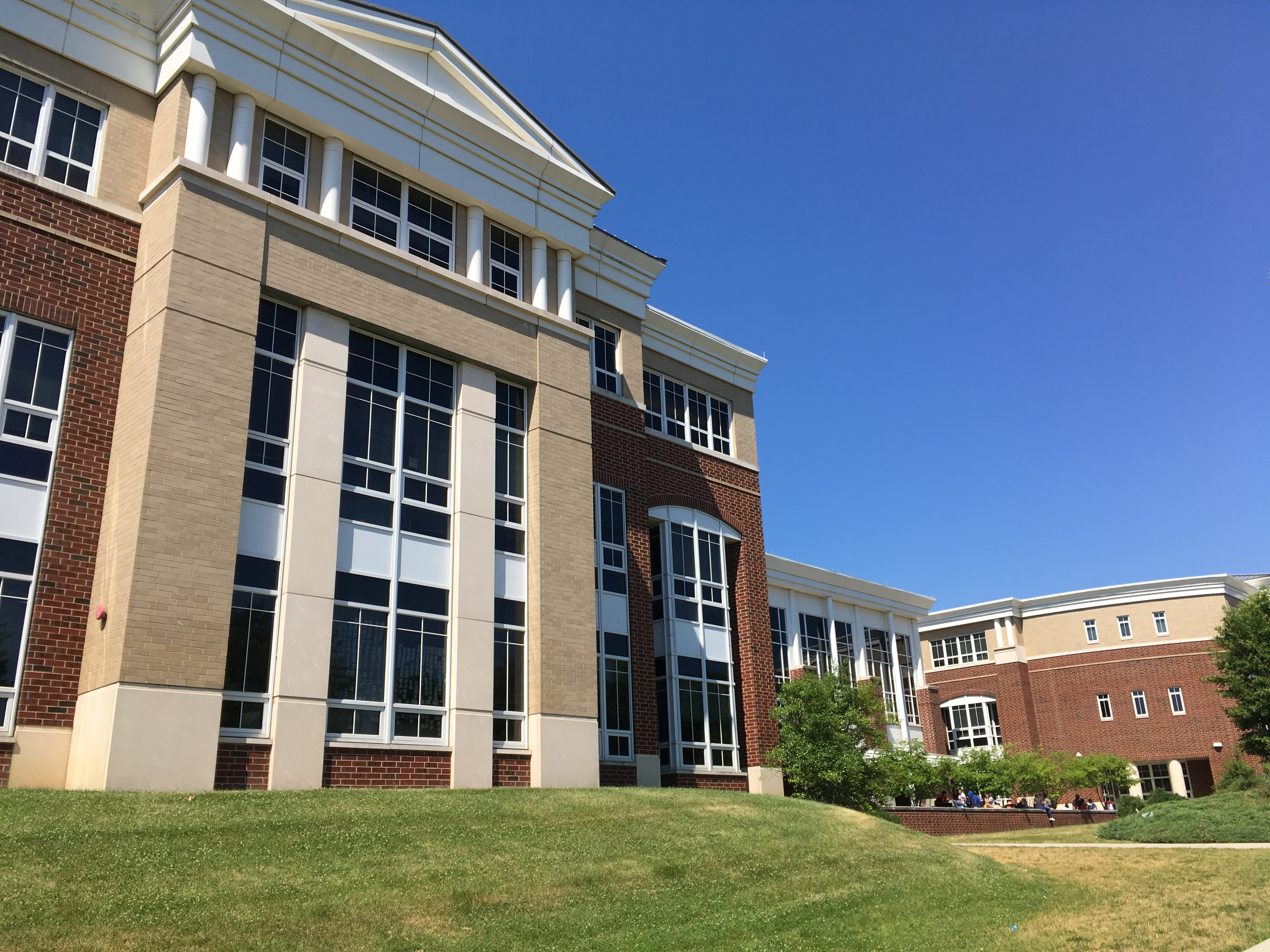

Location
- 3330 King Street; Alexandria, Virginia 22302; United States; 38.824°N 77.085°W

Information
- Former names: T. C. Williams High School (1965–2021)
- School type: Public, High school
- Founded: 1965
- Locale: City, Midsize
- School district: Alexandria City Public Schools
- NCES District ID: 5100120
- NCES School ID: 510012000054
- Principal: Lance Harrell (interim)
- Teaching staff: 305.78 (on an FTE basis)
- Grades: 9–12
- Enrollment: 4,655 (2024–25)
- Student to teacher ratio: 15.22
- Language: English
- Hours in school day: 7 hours
- Campus type: Suburban
- Colors: Blue, White and Red
- Athletics conference: Patriot District; Northern Region
- Nickname: Titans
- Newspaper: Theogony
- Yearbook: Cerberus
- Website: achs.acps.k12.va.us/

Alexandria City High School (formerly named T. C. Williams High School) is the public high school in the City of Alexandria, Virginia, United States, just outside of Washington, D.C. The high school has an enrollment of more than 4,200 students, split across four campuses. The primary campus is located near the geographic center of Alexandria on King Street, and the secondary campus is slightly more than a half mile away on Braddock Road. Tony the Titan is the school mascot, and the school colors are blue, white, and red. The school's football team was the subject of the 2000 film Remember the Titans.

The school, dubbed "A. C." and "ACHS," is organized under an academy model, and students join one of five learning academies centered around an instructional subject. The school offers numerous Advanced Placement courses, in addition to dual enrollment classes in partnership with Northern Virginia Community College.

Standout programs at ACHS include the student-run newspaper, Theogony, which frequently wins state and national awards, and the choir and band, which have each racked up awards up and down the east coast. The Army Junior ROTC program participated in President Barack Obama's 2009 Inaugural Parade, and in recent years the volleyball team twice won the state championship.

The school was originally named after Thomas Chambliss Williams, the superintendent of Alexandria City Public Schools from 1933 to 1963, who was an ardent supporter of racial segregation. The school was renamed Alexandria City High School by an April 8, 2021 local school board vote, following the 2020 peak of the Black Lives Matter social movement and local protests to change the name.

== History ==
=== King Street Campus ===
The King Street Campus is one of four ACHS campuses. Because it is the largest campus and has traditionally served the most students, it is considered to be the school's primary campus.

In 1965, what is now the King Street Campus, then called T. C. Williams, initially opened its doors to eighth graders, freshmen, sophomores, and juniors. The school graduated its first class in June 1967. It was Alexandria's third public high school, and Minnie Howard Middle School was its "feeder" school, for seventh and eighth graders.

In 1965, the city integrated its public schools. In 1971, the city consolidated all high school students into T. C. Williams, so that the school became Alexandria's only public senior high school serving 11th and 12th graders. The city's freshmen and sophomores attended Francis C. Hammond and George Washington, the other former four-year schools involved in the three school consolidation. While T. C. Williams and George Washington were already integrated in 1971, Hammond was nearly all white, while the city was about one-fifth black.

Increasing enrollment prompted plans for a new school. In January 2004, the Alexandria School Board approved a plan to build an entirely new school building at the existing location to provide more space. The new building opened on September 4, 2007. The original T. C. Williams building was demolished in January 2008. The new T. C. Williams campus was certified LEED Gold by the U.S. Green Building Council in 2009.

The gym of the original T. C. Williams building was named after Gerry Bertier, a member of the Titans' 1971 state championship football team who was paralyzed in a car crash and died 10 years later in a second auto accident near Charlottesville, Virginia. The newly constructed basketball court was named in honor of the late Earl Lloyd on December 1, 2007. Lloyd attended Parker-Gray High School, which was Alexandria's all-black high school at the time. Lloyd was the first African-American to play in the NBA.

The football stadium is named Parker-Gray Stadium in deference to the former pre-segregation high school, whose campus was sold for office buildings in the 1980s. The football field was grass until an artificial turf was installed in 2006.

During his run for the Democratic nomination, Barack Obama held a rally at T. C. Williams on February 10, 2008.

=== Minnie Howard Campus ===
The Minnie Howard Campus was built in 1954 as a 1st–7th grade elementary school. The transition to a 9th grade campus was made in 1969 due to a large and fast growth of the elementary age population in the area. The school was a single building with a field for lacrosse, soccer, and various other sports.

In 2019, because of capacity issues at both Minnie Howard and the main campus, the city approved on a plan to build a new, larger building on the Minnie Howard Campus with space for 1,600 students. In March 2022, construction began on the new building, which opened for the 2024–2025 school year. Its new multi-purpose field opened in 2025.

When the new building opened in 2024, it transitioned to begin accepting students from grades 9–12, just like the King Street Campus. The change came as part of ACPS's "High School Project." Many students attend classes at both campuses and commute between the two during the school day, either by riding provided school buses or by taking the 0.6 mile walk.

=== 2020 movement for name change ===
In 2020, in part inspired by the civil rights protests across the United States, a push to rename T. C. Williams began. Advocates for the change argued that the school's namesake, former superintendent Thomas Chambliss Williams, was a segregationist and had been unwilling to integrate Alexandria City schools. Although there had been past community efforts to rename the school, including in two efforts in the late 1990s and early 2000s, the efforts in 2020 were significantly larger and attracted more media coverage. A petition was circulated in June 2020 and submitted to the school board later that month. ACPS announced it would begin a review of the school's name, with a public engagement portion to be held in the fall of 2020.

In November 2020, the Alexandria City School Board voted unanimously to rename the school, with the name Alexandria City High School selected on April 8, 2021. The move to rename T.C. Williams sparked a similar movement to name another ACPS school, Matthew Maury Elementary.

== ACHS campuses today ==
Today, ACHS serves 9th through 12th grade students at four campuses in what ACPS calls a "connected high school network."

The King Street Campus and the Minnie Howard Campus, located 0.6 miles (1.0 km) apart from each other, comprise the vast majority of the student body. The King Street Campus is considered to be the primary campus because it traditionally held students in grades 10–12, while the Minnie Howard Campus traditionally held students in grade 9.

The Satellite Campus (1.9 miles east of the King Street Campus)—which is located in East Alexandria at the ACPS Central Office building—is composed of around 75 students, who mostly complete their schoolwork online. The Chance for Change Campus is designed to support students with behavioral challenges. The number of students who attend the Chance for Change campus often fluctuates, but is typically between 20 and 60. It sometimes includes middle school students.

Two ACPS middle schools, Francis C. Hammond Middle School (1.8 miles west of the King Street Campus), and George Washington Middle School (2.0 miles south east of the King Street Campus), serve 6th through 8th grade students and are housed in the former high schools.

=== The High School Project ===
The four-campus system was developed as part of what ACPS called the "High School Project," an initiative that has not been short of controversy. The High School Project started in August 2018 as ACPS searched for ways to alleviate overcrowding. In March 2019, the Alexandria City School Board voted to advance plans to build a new high school—in a "connected high school network"—at the Minnie Howard site. The school opened in May 2024. The academy instructional model was implemented as part of the High School Project.

During the implementation of the High School Project, several controversies arose after being reported by the ACHS newspaper Theogony. Many articles were republished in the Alexandria Times. In April 2024, Theogony reported that 16 ACHS administrators had been notified they must re-apply for their jobs due to a restructuring as part of the High School Project. The Alexandria Times reported in August 2024 that many of the administrators had been removed from their positions, including Spanish-speaking administrators in the King Street Campus's International Academy.

In September 2024, in an article titled "Transportation Issues Plague School Year," Theogony reported that students commuting between the King Street Campus and Minnie Howard Campus during the school day cumulatively missed hours of class time due to a lack of adequate busing. ACPS officials publicly disputed Theogony's reporting, but pressure from the Alexandria City Council prompted ACPS to change its policies. In December 2024, Theogony reported that the busing issue had largely been resolved.

== Demographics ==
During the 1980s, Alexandria experienced a notable demographic transformation as immigrants from Central America, particularly El Salvador, began settling in the city in significant numbers. Many of these families established themselves in the Arlandria neighborhood, an area that became widely known as Chirilagua due to its large Salvadoran population. As T.C. Williams served as the sole high school for the Alexandria City Public Schools district, this population growth contributed to a steady increase in the school's Latino and international student enrollment.

As of the 2024 school year, Alexandria City High School's student body is 42.1% Hispanic, 24.8% African American, 24.6% White, 5.4% Asian, 2.1% multi-racial, less than 1% Indigenous/American Indian/Alaska native, and less than 1% Native Hawaiian/Pacific Islander.

Alexandria City High also has a growing International Academy program, part of the wider International Academy Network, which serves to accommodate the large surge of immigrants to the Washington, DC, area by teaching English to non-native speakers alongside a rigorous, credit-earning high school curriculum. The International Academy currently has an enrollment of around 600 students, and contains speakers of over 60 languages. It is not to be confused with the academy instructional model at the school, and it is not one of the six learning academies.

== Academics ==
Alexandria City High School offers more than a dozen AP courses. It has been ranked by the 2016 Washington Post "Challenge Index" with an index of 2.836. Under the leadership of Dr. Manu Patel, T. C. was the first Virginia high school to defeat Thomas Jefferson High School for Science and Technology in Fairfax County, Virginia, at the Science Bowl. The school also offers five foreign languages to students: Spanish, German, French, Latin, and Chinese.

ACHS is currently conditionally accredited by the Virginia Department of Education. Students on average have consistently scored lower on standardized tests than state averages, particularly on math and science tests. Students who learn English as a second language—36.6% of students at ACHS in 2025—especially struggle.

The school is structured under an academy model, and students are required to join one of five instructional academies. In their freshman years, students join either the Science Technology, Engineering, & Math (STEM) Academy; Education, Liberal Arts, & Human Services Academy; Business & Government Academy; Visual & Performing Arts Academy; or General Studies Academy. Students can only change their academy once over their four years at ACHS.

The STEM and Education, Liberal Arts, & Human Services academies are based at the Minnie Howard Campus, and the other academies are based at the King Street Campus.

== Extra-curricular activities ==
A. C. teams play in the AAA Patriot District of Region 6C, formerly the AAA Northern Region. The school mascot is a Titan. The school colors, blue, white and red, are a synthesis of the former colors of the three pre-1971 four-year high schools: blue (from G. W.), white (from Hammond), and red (T. C. W.). The Titans are best known for their football program, which the movie Remember the Titans was based upon.

A. C. boys soccer won the Virginia 6A state championship in 2014 and finished the season ranked number one in the Washington, DC, area and number 9 nationally, evoking the slogan "Remember These Titans." The girls' volleyball team won the state title in the pandemic-shortened 2020–2021 season and again in 2022–2023. Girls' basketball and boys' tennis teams have all captured district championships since 2006. Additionally, the soccer team captured a state title in 2014, with a 2–0 win over Washington-Lee High School.

=== Football and Remember the Titans ===
T. C. and its former football coaches, Herman Boone and Bill Yoast, were the subject of the 2000 motion picture Remember the Titans, starring Denzel Washington and Will Patton. The movie was a heavily fictionalized dramatization of the consolidation of Alexandria's three public high schools into one in the fall of 1971. That year, ACPS consolidated its three four-year high schools into a single two-year school, teaching solely juniors and seniors. As a result, the best of the varsity football squads at George Washington High School (converted to a middle school), Hammond High School (converted to a middle school) and T. C. Williams High School united in what amounted to an all-city, all-star team at T. C. Williams. The city's public schools were legally desegregated in 1959. The three high schools had become racially imbalanced during the 1960s, due to redlining. Racial tension is one of themes of the film. Yoast was the head coach at Hammond, who won the state title in 1970, while Boone was a head coach at E.J. Hayes High School in Williamston, North Carolina, with five state championships and a 99–8 (.925) record in nine seasons, from 1961 through 1969. He was not retained after a consolidation and integration of two high schools. Boone was hired as an assistant at T.C. Williams, and expected to be to Yoast's assistant after the Alexandria consolidation in 1971.

The climax of the movie is the fictionalized 1971 AAA state championship football game between T. C. Williams and George C. Marshall High School. The dramatic license taken in the movie was to convert what was actually a mid-season matchup between T. C. Williams and Marshall into a made-for-Hollywood state championship. In reality, the Marshall game was the toughest game T. C. Williams played all year and the actual state championship (against Andrew Lewis High School of Salem) was a 27–0 win. As depicted in the movie, the real Titans won the Marshall game on a fourth down come-from-behind play at the very end of the game.

T. C. Williams was referenced in the "My No Good Reason" episode of the television show Scrubs. Three actors wearing T. C. Williams letter jackets appear towards the end of the episode. Donald Faison, who plays Dr. Turk on the sitcom, also starred in Remember the Titans as Petey Jones. Jones died in July 2019, aged 65.

==== Rugby ====
Alexandria City has both boys and girls varsity rugby teams. Coached for the last 16 years by Jeff Murphy, they currently compete against teams in the DC metro area; including Gonzaga College High School, Landon, and The Heights School. The Titans program has produced notable players such as US Air Force and Seattle Seawolves forward Capt. Eric Duechle.

=== Rowing ===
A.C. has a rowing program, which has its own boathouse on the Alexandria bank of the Potomac River. A.C. Crew has claimed state, national, and international championships.

=== Arts ===
The A.C. Theater department participates in both the Cappies program and the VHSL's One-Act Competition, faring very well in both arenas. In recent memory, three one-act plays, "Ladying", "Shuffling", and "The Brick Joke", have made it to the Regional level of One-Acts, in 2010, 2013, and 2020 respectively. The A.C. Drama Department has also received attention for choosing shows that are considered risky for high schools, including 2010s Chicago; Rent and The Laramie Project in 2011; 2012's The Island of Doctor Moreau, the 2014 production of A Chorus Line, and the 2015 production of Twilight: Los Angeles, 1992.

==== Band ====
ACHS has 2 Jazz Bands, Jazz band A and B. B is the lower and A is the higher. They perform at many festivals and have their own concerts at the school. Jazz band practices before school starts from 7:30- 8:15. The Jazz Bands are a 2 time Chantilly Jazz festival winner in 2022 and 2023. They also won the Chantilly Jazz festival Combo award in 2026. ACHS also has 3 concert band: Wind Ensemble (Highest Level 5th Period), Symphonic Band (Middle Level 7th Period), Concert Band (Lowest Level 6th Period). They all perform at concerts in the spring and winter. Wind Ensemble has an extra concert in the fall near the end of Marching Band season. All concert bands perform for the VBODA concert assessment in mid March. ACHS also has a Marching Band called the Marching Titans. They perform at all Varsity Football home games. They also perform at many competitions in the region. In late October they perform at the marching Assessment for VBODA. For the 2026 marching season ACHS is a 6A band. Near Halloween time they play in the Alexandria Halloween parade on Mt. Vernon Avenue. They dress up as zombies for fun. The Marching Band wears a uniform with a Shako hat. ACHS has been a 6 time Virginia Honor Band in 1989, 2020, 2022, 2023, 2025, 2026. ACHS is also a 12 Virginia Blue Ribbon School Award in 2012, 2013, 2014, 2016, 2017, 2018, 2019, 2022, 2023, 2024, 2025, 2026

== Alumni ==
- Diedrich Bader – actor and comedian
- Ronnie Bass – member of 1971 State Championship team featured in the 2000 film Remember the Titans, played college football at South Carolina
- Gerry Bertier – American football player, wheelchair athlete, member of 1971 State Championship team featured in the 2000 film Remember the Titans. Gold-medal winner at Paralympics
- Katherine Boo – journalist
- Fred Borchelt – 1984 Olympic rowing silver medalist (Class of 1972)
- Daniel Patrick Boyd – Convicted for being a part of Raleigh jihad group
- Keith Burns – former NFL player and coach
- Jason Butler Harner – actor
- Charles Esten – actor and comedian
- John Gardner Ford – businessman
- Steven Ford – actor (Class of 1974)
- J. Holiday – R&B singer-songwriter
- Susan M. Kidwell – paleontologist (Class of 1976)
- Thad Levine – General Manager, Senior Vice President Minnesota Twins (Class of 1990)
- Robert Longerbeam – college football cornerback for the Rutgers Scarlet Knights (Class of 2020)
- Josephus Lyles – Professional Athlete (sprinter) (Class of 2017)
- Noah Lyles – Professional Athlete (sprinter) (Class of 2016)
- Jamie Mason – Author
- Serena McIlwain – secretary of the Maryland Department of the Environment
- Dean Muhtadi – WWE Wrestler Mojo Rawley, former NFL player, host of TMZ Sports (Class of 2004)
- Dermot Mulroney – actor
- Kieran Mulroney – actor and director
- W. Tayloe Murphy – state delegate and state treasurer
- Donnell Rawlings – comedian and actor
- Montie Rissell – convicted serial killer
- LaChina Robinson – basketball analyst, former college basketball player
- Nyla Rose - AEW wrestler and former Women's Champion
- Tierra Ruffin-Pratt – basketball player (Class of 2009)
- Jeremy Saulnier – writer and director of films such as Green Room (film) and Rebel Ridge
- Kali Uchis – singer-songwriter and producer (Class of 2012)
- Casey Wilson – actress and screenwriter (Class of 1998)
- Edward Wong – journalist and foreign correspondent
- Tracy Young – Grammy winner, DJ, music producer, remixer
