= Ronnie Bass =

American football player (born 1955)

No. 12
- Position: Quarterback

Personal information
- Born: October 28, 1955 (age 71); Fort Walton Beach, Florida, U.S.

Career information
- High school: T.C. Williams (Alexandria, VA)
- College: South Carolina (1973–1977)

Ronald Edwin "Sunshine" Bass (born October 28, 1955) is an American former football player who played at T.C. Williams High School in Alexandria, Virginia, and the University of South Carolina. He was portrayed by actor Kip Pardue in the 2000 film Remember the Titans which is about his high school's 1971 State Championship team, on which he was the starting quarterback.

== Early life ==
Bass was born in Fort Walton Beach, Florida, in October 1955, the son of Williamson G. "Bill" Bass and Betty Jean McCauley. Bass' father was an officer in the United States Air Force. Due to his father's military career, Bass and his family moved frequently as he was growing up. The family lived in Smackover, Arkansas, Stillwater, Oklahoma, Huntington Beach, California, and finally Alexandria, Virginia. Most of Bass' education took place in Huntington Beach, where he attended Gill Elementary, Stacey Jr. High, and Marina High School. After moving to Alexandria, Bass finished his last two years of High School at T.C. Williams, graduating with the class of 1972.

== High school ==
During his early years at Huntington Beach, Bass realized he wanted to play football. At Marina High, he started his sophomore year as a defensive back while also playing backup quarterback. After moving to Virginia, Bass became the starting quarterback, as well as adopting the nickname "Sunshine", at T.C. Williams High School. The nickname was given to him by his teammates due to his blonde hair and sunburn. Bass was a starter on the team during both his junior and senior years, and led T.C. Williams to the Virginia AAA state High School championship his junior year in 1971.

=== Remember the Titans ===
Bass and others have stated that many scenes in the 2000 film Remember the Titans are fictional, and do not portray the real-life Ronald Bass accurately. For example, in the movie, Bass is depicted as a long-haired hippie. He has, however, been quoted in the Greenville News as saying, "I was never quite like that ... But that's Hollywood. I'll say for the record my hair was never that long."

In the film, Bass, played by Kip Pardue, arrives after camp begins and is introduced to the Titans' coaches by his father, United States Air Force Colonel Bass, as they had just arrived in town. In real life, the Bass family had already been in Alexandria before camp started and had practiced with rival quarterback "Rev" in unofficial workouts held during the summer. "Ronnie went down (to the Burg) every day, and he related to the kids there in the ghetto," Boone stated in the film's DVD commentary. "This is one of the reasons they called him 'Sunshine.' ".

Commenting on the scene in the movie in which his character kisses Gerry Bertier (Ryan Hurst) on the lips in the locker room, Bass has stated that the incident never happened.

Bass has also observed that in the movie, "(Denzel Washington) did come across as a disciplinarian, which Coach Boone was, he was a perfectionist, which Coach Boone tried to be, and he had a temper and was in your face a lot." Boone admits, in his DVD commentary, that he was a disciplinarian, but adds that he has a warm side that doesn't come across in the film. "I wanted to make the team," Bass noted. "I think that's where most of the kids' minds were. We were just trying to play football."

== College career ==
Bass went on to play at the University of South Carolina on a football scholarship. He started at quarterback his junior and senior year and lettered all four years. As a sophomore, in the October 26, 1974, game against their rival and 14-point favorite University of North Carolina, Bass ran the ball 39 times for 211 yards and two touchdowns in a 31–23 upset victory. He was named Sports Illustrated's offensive player of the week.

=== Statistics ===
Passing								Rushing
Year	Comp	Att	Yards	Pct.	TDs	Int	Rating	Att	Yds	Avg	TD
1973	15	23	228	65.2	1	0	162.8	57	292	5.1	2
1974	18	39	245	46.2	0	2	88.7	107	460	4.3	2
1976	119	199	1,320	59.8	9	10	120.4	131	101	0.8	4
1977	82	176	1,140	46.6	4	12	94.9	151	177	1.2	4
Totals	234	447	2,933	53.5	14	24	109.5	446	1,030	2.3	12

== After football ==
Bass served as a sports announcer for WIS radio in Columbia before moving into advertising. He attended the Remember the Titans Hollywood premiere along with former players in 2000.
