= Raleigh jihad group =

Suspected terrorist cell in United States

The Raleigh jihad group refers to seven men arrested on July 27, 2009, near Raleigh, North Carolina on charges of participating in a conspiracy to commit "violent jihad". An eighth man in the indictment, believed to be in Pakistan, was not arrested. Daniel Boyd was the suspected ringleader, who along with Hysen Sherifi were also indicted on conspiring to attack troops at the US Marine Corps Base in Quantico, Virginia.

== History ==
The men were accused of plotting to wage "violent jihad" outside the United States. The alleged leader of the group, Daniel Patrick Boyd, was accused of recruiting seven men, including two of his sons, to take part in a conspiracy "to advance violent jihad, including supporting and participating in terrorist activities abroad and committing acts of murder, kidnapping or maiming persons abroad." According to the indictment, members of the group practiced military tactics and the use of weapons in rural North Carolina, and traveled to Gaza, Israel, Jordan and Kosovo hoping "to engage in violent jihad."

== Defendants ==
All defendants faced one count each of conspiring to provide resources to terrorists and conspiring to murder, kidnap and injure persons abroad.

- Daniel Patrick Boyd, 39, a U.S.-born citizen. Alleged leader of the group, accused of recruiting the seven men. Lives in Willow Spring with his wife, three sons, daughter, and daughter-in-law. Also accused of selling a gun to a felon. Boyd was released in December 2024.
- Dylan (a.k.a. Mohammad) Boyd, 22, Daniel Boyd's eldest son. Lives in Willow Spring with his wife and parents. Also accused of selling a gun to a felon. Boyd has a scheduled release date of July 15, 2016.
- Zakariya Boyd, 20, Daniel Boyd's second eldest son. Lives with parents in Willow Spring. Traveled with his father to Israel in 2007, but was denied entry. Boyd has a scheduled release date of May 30, 2017.
- Anes Subasic, 33, a Bosnian refugee and a naturalized American citizen. Resides in Holly Springs, North Carolina with his father. Attended a sniper training camp in Las Vegas Subasic has a scheduled release date of October 8, 2035.
- Mohammad Omar Aly Hassan, 22, a U.S.-born citizen. Traveled with Ziyad Yaghi to Israel in April 2007, but was denied entry at Ben Gurion International Airport. Hassan has a scheduled release date of August 21, 2022.
- Ziyad "Jimmy" Yaghi, 21, a naturalized American citizen. Traveled to Jordan in 2006. Traveled with Mohammad Omar Aly Hassan to Israel in April 2007, but was denied entry at Ben Gurion International Airport. He has a scheduled release date of February 26, 2037.
- Hysen Sherifi, 24, the only non U.S. citizen, a native of Kosovo, and a U.S. legal permanent resident. An ethnic Albanian born in Gnjilane, SFR Yugoslavia. Flew to Kosovo on 30 July 2008 where he stayed seven months. Sherifi has a scheduled release date of October 19, 2048.
- Jude Kenan Mohammad, 20, a U.S.-born citizen. Traveled to Pakistan in October 2008, where he was arrested by Pakistani officials and accused of trying to travel illegally in a tribal area along the Pakistan-Afghan border. Killed in a drone strike in Pakistan in November 2011.

At their detention hearings, U.S. Magistrate Judge William Webb ruled that all were to be held without bond until trial.
