= Khalilah Sabra =

American attorney and activist

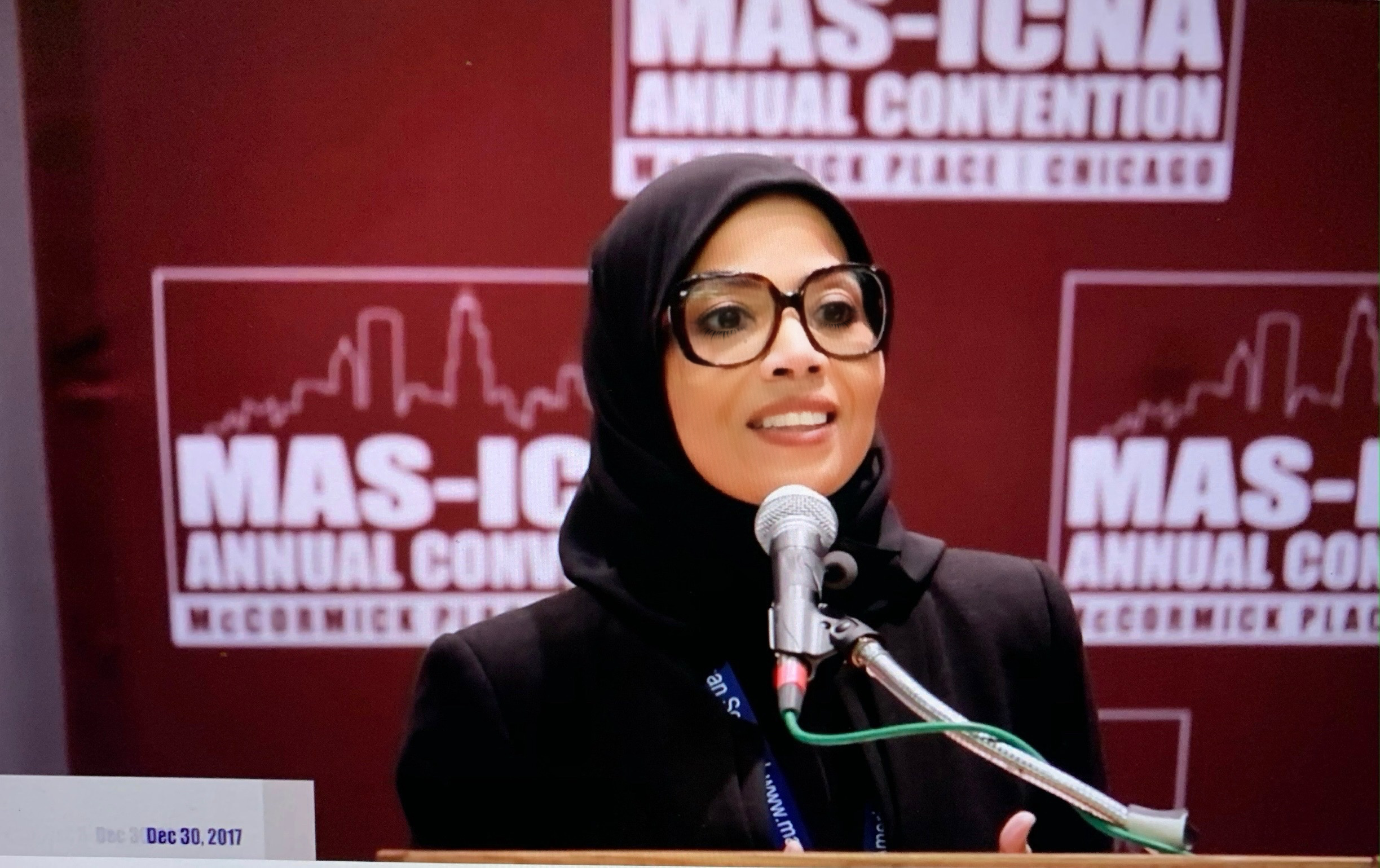
- Khalilah Sabra at the at MAS-ICNA Annual Convention 2018
- Born: 1967 (age 58–59); Northern Mariana Islands, U.S.
- Education: Bachelor Degree [Criminal Law], California State University; Master's Degree Legal Studies] University of Damascus School of Law [Juris Doctor and Ph.D.]
- Occupations: Attorney, Transnational Forensic Expert [Middle Eastern and Islamic Ideology] Human Rights Advocate, Financial Mediator
- Political party: Democratic
- Website: masijc.org

Khalilah Sabra (born 1967) is an American immigration attorney, civil rights advocate, author, columnist, and senior legal and policy advisor. She has worked in immigration law, civil-rights advocacy, humanitarian documentation, and public commentary, including leadership roles in nonprofit legal services and civic engagement initiatives in North Carolina.

== Early life and education ==
Sabra was born in the Northern Mariana Islands, a United States territory, into a military family. She converted to Islam as a teenager and has discussed faith and conscience as influences in public life.

She earned a Bachelor of Science degree in Criminal Justice from California State University and completed postgraduate legal studies at the University of California, Los Angeles (UCLA). She later earned a Ph.D. in International Law, with research interests described as including political asylum and human rights.

== Career ==
=== Legislative and policy work ===
Press profiles describe Sabra as having worked in legislative settings early in her career, including service in the office of former U.S. Congressman Mervyn Dymally and an internship in the United States House of Representatives, where she worked on research related to civil rights and freedom of expression.

=== Muslim American Society Immigrant Justice Center ===
Sabra is identified in regional press as Executive Director of the Muslim American Society Immigrant Justice Center (MASIJC), a nonprofit legal services organization providing immigration representation and advocacy in North Carolina. According to MASIJC, the organization provides immigration legal services and advocacy for refugees, asylum seekers, and other vulnerable populations.

Organizational materials report immigration court outcomes during her tenure, including cases involving gender-based claims and threats of violence.

Sabra has also participated in civic-engagement initiatives focused on immigrant community participation, including census-related outreach cited in national reporting on engagement with Muslim communities.

=== Expert witness and humanitarian documentation ===
Sabra has described work involving country-conditions analysis and human-rights documentation; government and academic sources address frameworks for documenting violence and vulnerabilities affecting children and communities and are cited in connection with related advocacy contexts.

She contributed research through the Syrian Accountability Project (Syracuse University), including authorship of Looking Through the Window Darkly, which documents alleged incidents of rape and analyzes patterns of sexual violence during the Syrian conflict.

== Writing and publications ==
=== Books ===
Sabra is the author of An Unordinary Death: The Life of a Palestinian (2006), published by Brill in the Transgressions: Cultural Studies and Education series.

=== Essays and commentary ===
Sabra has written on immigration, civil rights, and religious freedom in regional newspapers, including The News & Observer. She has also authored essays on gender, religion, and civil rights, including The Feminist Divide: Rewriting the Boundaries.

== Public engagement and media ==
Sabra has appeared on C-SPAN, including coverage of a 2014 rally opposing Israeli military action in Gaza.

Harvard University’s Pluralism Project has documented related civic activity and organizational initiatives in North Carolina involving the Muslim American Society.

== Awards and recognition ==
In 2013, Sabra received the International Human Rights Award from the Human Rights Coalition of North Carolina, as documented in an ACLU of North Carolina newsletter reporting on the awards dinner.

== Personal life ==
Journalistic profiles note that Sabra converted to Islam as a teenager and later became active in Muslim civil-rights advocacy.
