= Herman Boone =

American football coach (1935–2019)

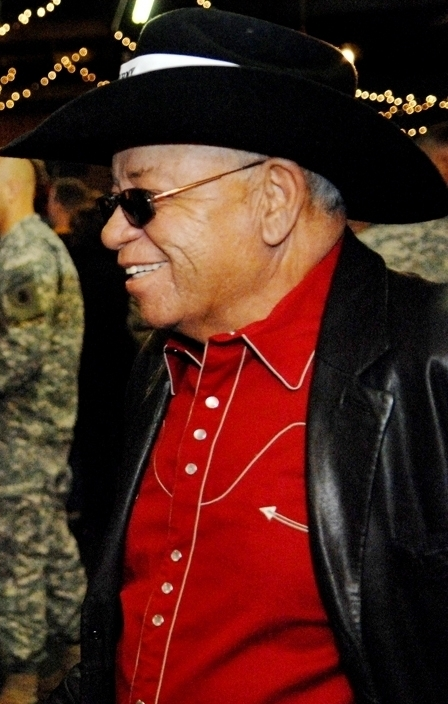
- Boone in January 2008
- Born: Herman Ike Boone; October 28, 1935; Rocky Mount, North Carolina, U.S.
- Died: December 18, 2019 (aged 84); Alexandria, Virginia, U.S.
- Education: North Carolina Central University (B.A., M.S.)
- Occupation: High school football coach
- Known for: Coaching the 1971 T. C. Williams High School football team (made famous by Remember the Titans)
- Spouse: Carol Luck (m. 1962; died 2019)
- Children: 3

Herman Ike Boone (October 28, 1935 – December 18, 2019) was an American high school football coach who coached the 1971 T. C. Williams High School football team to a 13–0 season, state championship, and national runner-up. That season later served as the basis for the film Remember the Titans in 2000, in which Boone was portrayed by actor Denzel Washington.

== Early life and education ==
Boone attended Abraham Lincoln Elementary School, then the now-closed Booker T. Washington High School in Rocky Mount, North Carolina. While attending North Carolina Central University, Boone joined the Tau Psi chapter of the Omega Psi Phi fraternity. Boone graduated with a Bachelor of Arts degree and a Master of Science degree.

== Career ==
In 1958, Boone accepted his first teaching and coaching position at the Luther H. Foster High School in Blackstone, Virginia, where he coached football, basketball and baseball. His teams recorded twenty-six wins, six losses and three district championships.

In 1961, Boone returned to his home state of North Carolina to continue his coaching and teaching career. He accepted an assistant coach position at E.J. Hayes High School in Williamston, North Carolina. His football teams amassed a record of 99 wins and 8 losses in a nine-year period. The 1966 football team was recognized by Scholastic Coach's Magazine as "The Number One Football Team in America". In 1969, Boone resigned from his position, having been informed by the Williamston school board that the town of Williamston "was not ready for a black head coach".

Boone was hired as a Physical Education teacher and was an assistant football coach at T. C. Williams High School in 1969 where he also was the head junior varsity wrestling coach. Having fully integrated its high schools in 1965 (the elementary schools began City school integration on February 10, 1959), the city of Alexandria, Virginia, consolidated students from three high schools into T. C. Williams in 1971, and Boone was named the head coach of the combined team. Boone took the team on a preseason training trip to Gettysburg, Pennsylvania, where the team members got to know each other, and President Richard Nixon sent an aide, Dr. Brown, to see this integrated football team that was beginning to catch national attention. In December 1971, Nixon was quoted as saying of the Titans that "the team saved the city of Alexandria".

Boone was fired from his coaching position in 1979, after allegations of player abuse and related complaints by three assistant coaches. He subsequently retired from coaching and appeared as a public speaker at functions regarding his time as coach. In 2016, he was awarded the Living Legends of Alexandria award given to notable citizens of Alexandria, Virginia.

== Personal life ==
In retirement, Boone lived with his wife, Carol Luck, in Alexandria, Virginia. They had three daughters, Sharron, Donna, and Monica, and six grandchildren, Camri, Kiara, William, Mackenzie, Myles, and Lauren.

Boone was a friend of Willie Jeffries, dating back to when the two were assistant coaches in North Carolina. Boone wrote a letter of recommendation in support of Jeffries' induction into the College Football Hall of Fame. In it, Boone wrote, "Without his leadership and example, there would not have been Remember the Titans or the advancement in race relations in sports that we have witnessed."

== Death ==
Boone died at his home in Alexandria on December 18, 2019, at the age of 84. He had been diagnosed with lung cancer. His wife, Carol, had died on March 23, 2019.

== Portrayal in film ==
The 2000 film Remember the Titans, in which Denzel Washington portrays Boone, is based on the 1971 T. C. Williams High School football season.

== Trophy ==
The Herman Boone Trophy is awarded to the winning team of the U.S. Army All-American Bowl, a game between high school All-American seniors.

== See also ==
- List of teachers portrayed in films
